= Karlsruhe =

City in Baden-Württemberg, Germany

Karlsruhe Kallsruh (South Franconian)
- City
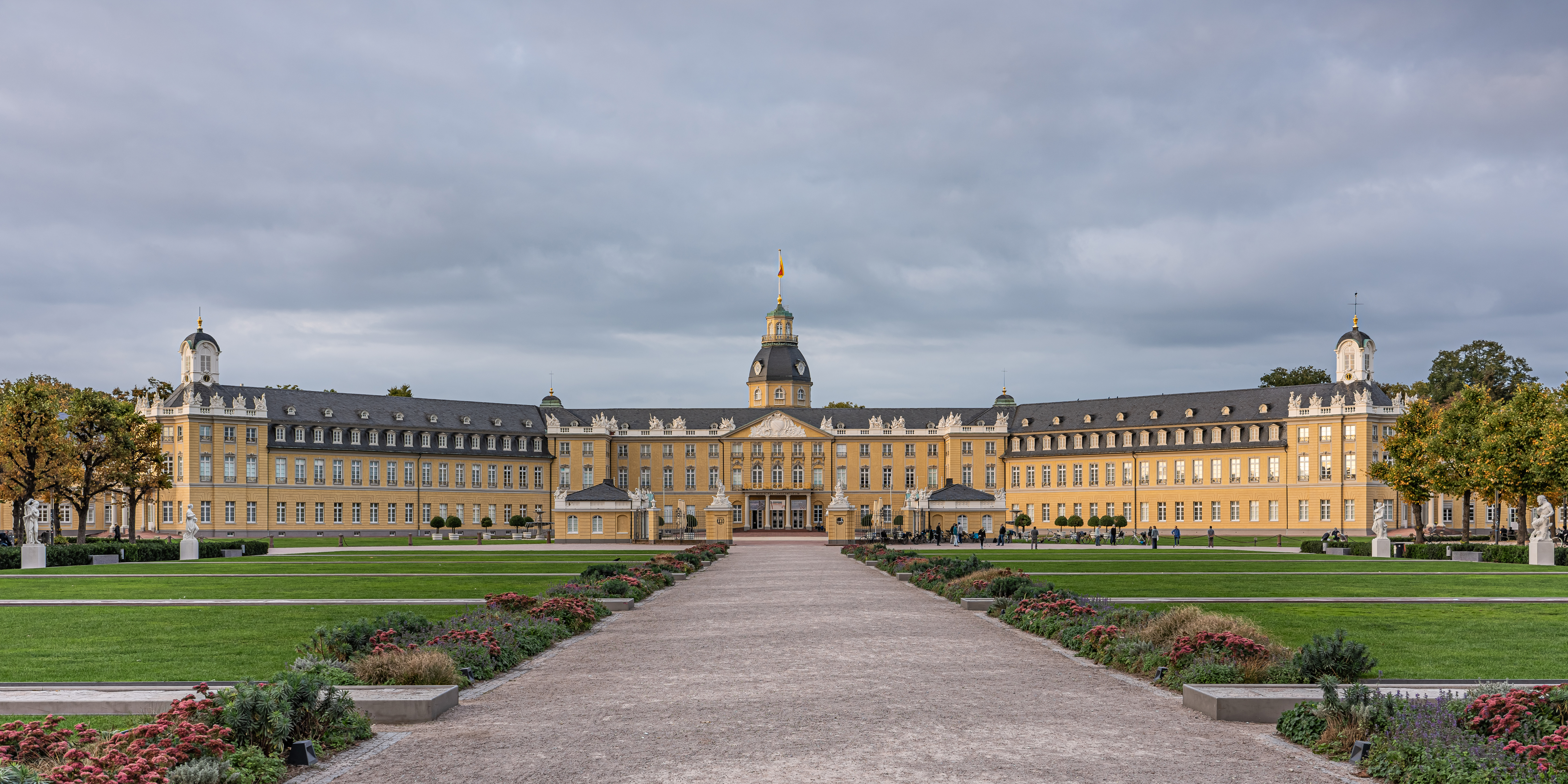
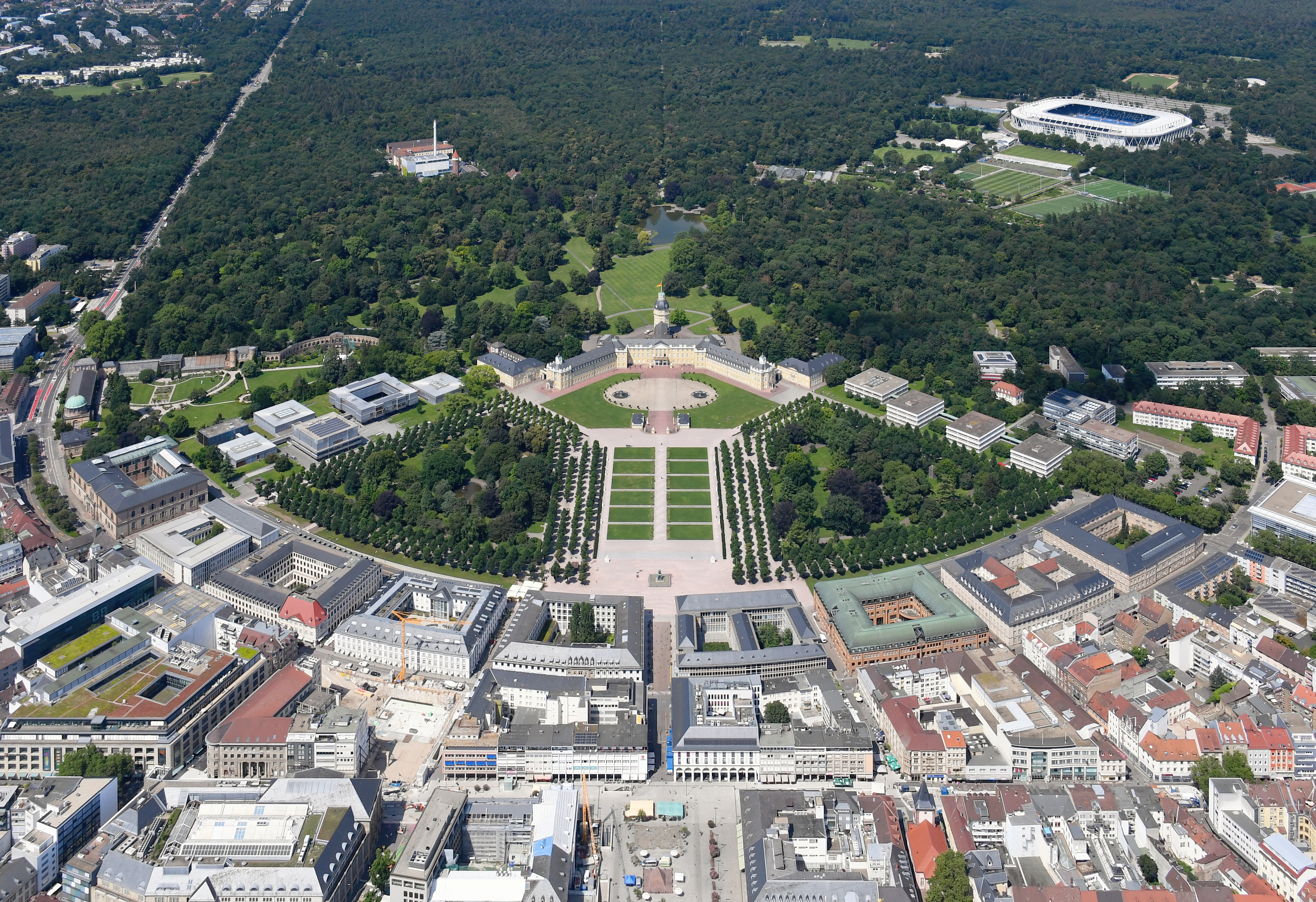
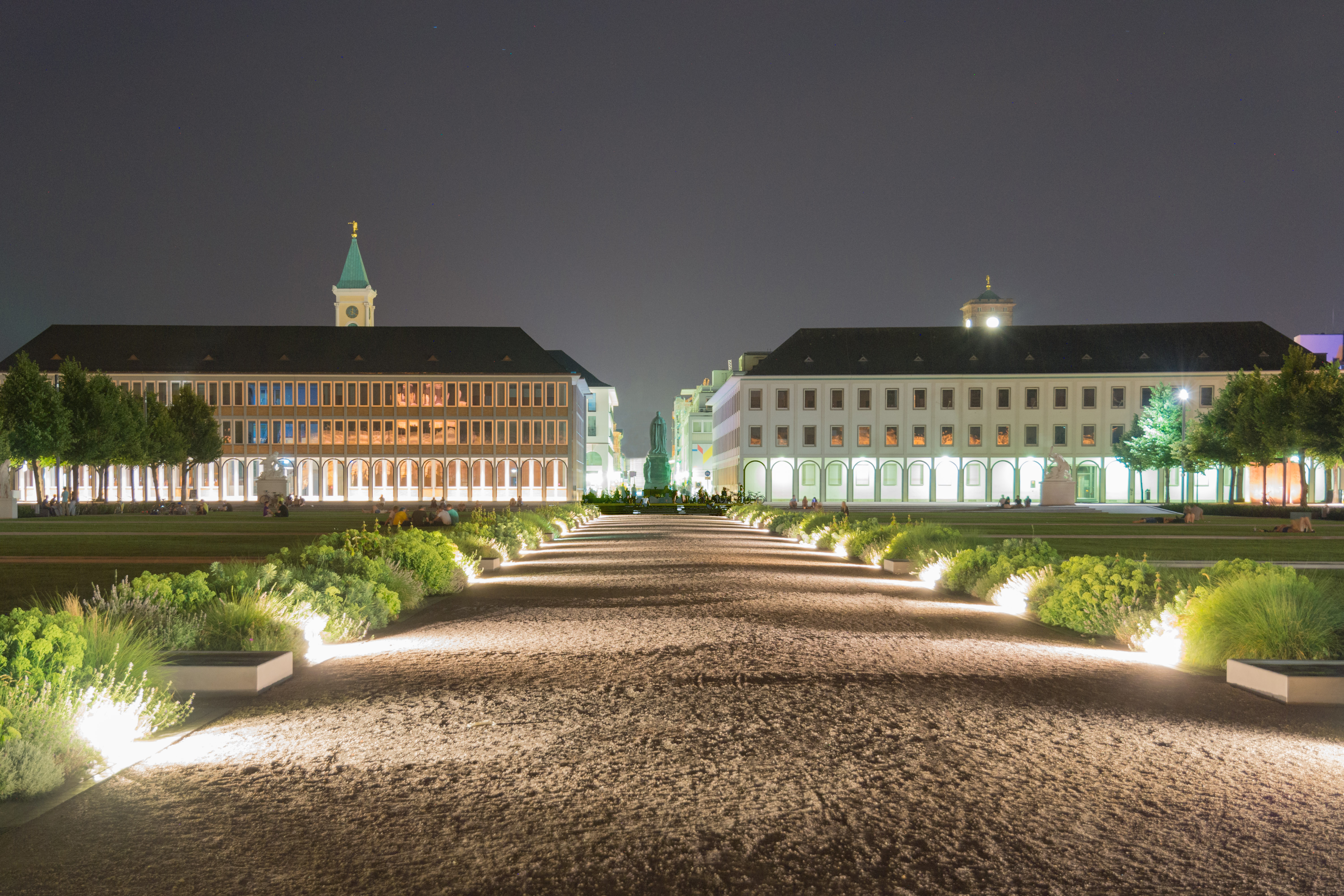
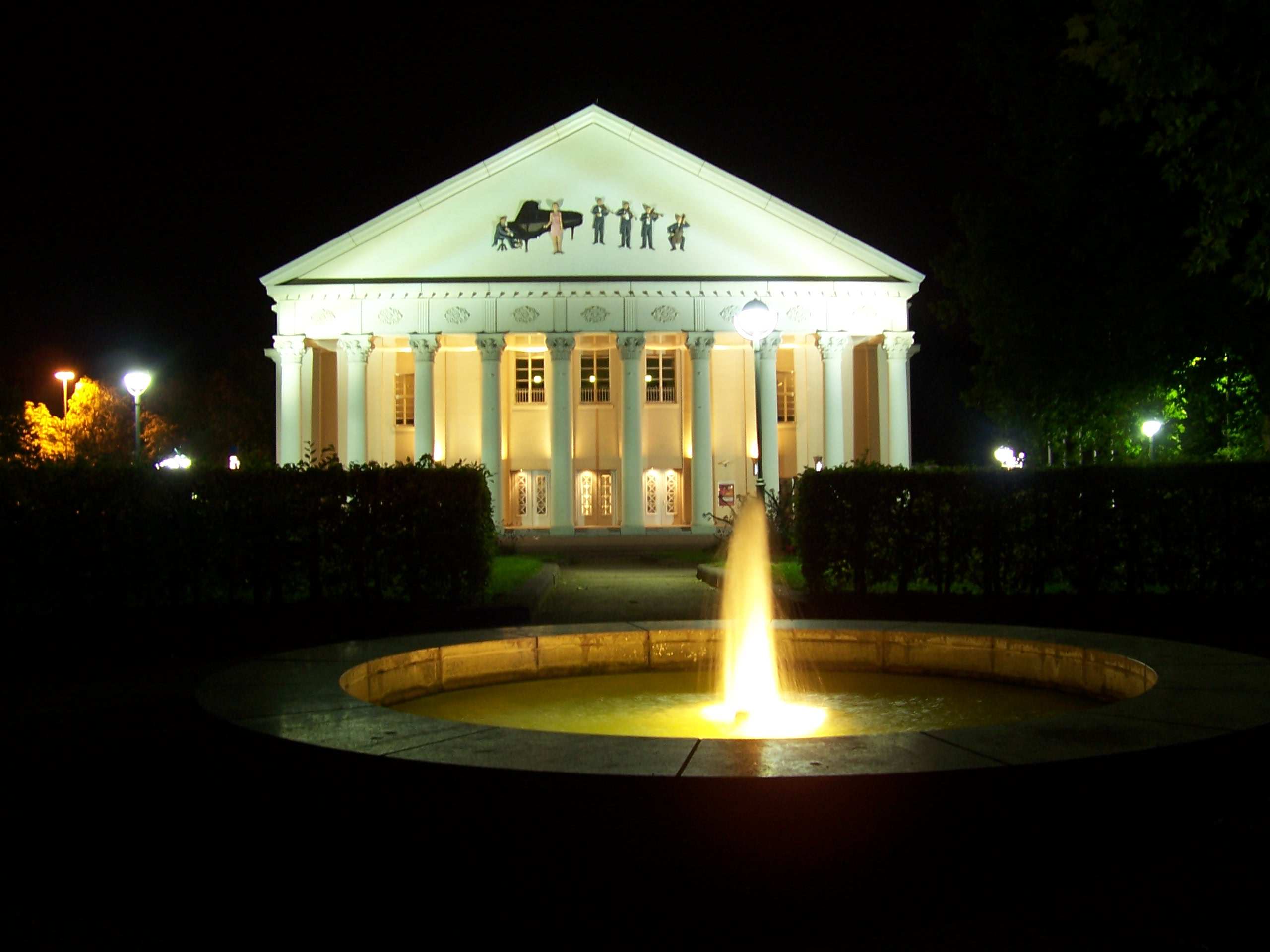
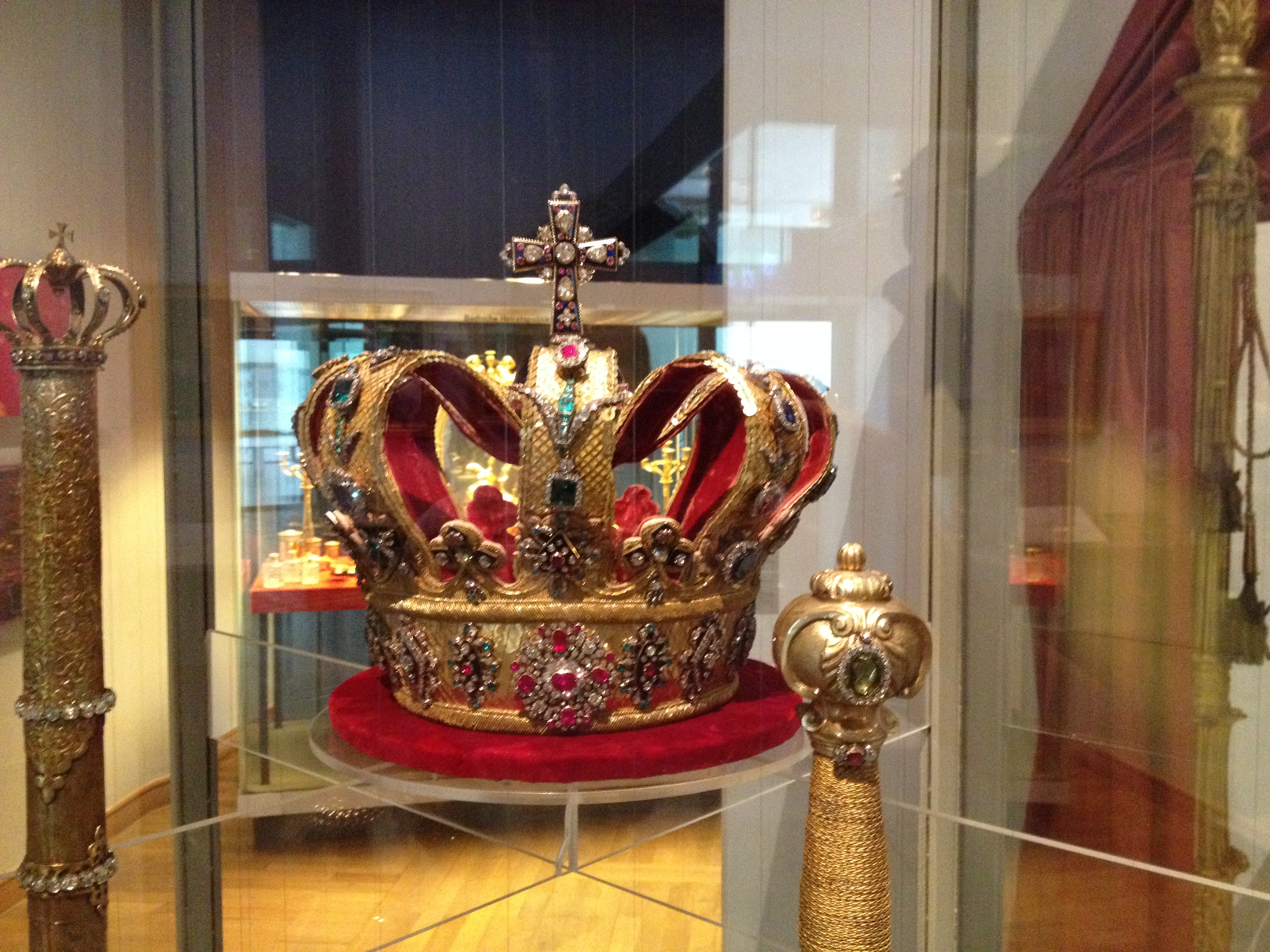
- Karlsruhe Palace Schlossgarten Schlossplatz Konzerthaus Crown of Baden

- Flag Coat of arms
- Interactive map of Karlsruhe
- Location within Germany Location within Baden-Württemberg
- Coordinates: 49°00′33″N 8°24′14″E
- Country: Germany
- State: Baden-Württemberg
- Admin. region: Karlsruhe
- District: Urban district
- Founded: 1715
- Subdivisions: 27 quarters

Government
  - Mayor (2020–28): Frank Mentrup (SPD)

Area
  - Total: 173.46 km^{2} (66.97 sq mi)
- Elevation: 115 m (377 ft)

Population (2025-12-31)
  - Total: 309,247
  - Density: 1,782.8/km^{2} (4,617.5/sq mi)
- Time zone: UTC+01:00 (CET)
  - Summer (DST): UTC+02:00 (CEST)
- Postal codes: 76131–76229
- Dialling codes: 0721
- Vehicle registration: KA
- Website: karlsruhe.de

Karlsruhe (Note: /ˈkɑːrlzruːə/ KARLZ-roo-ə, US also /ˈkɑːrls-/ KARLSS-; German: [ˈkaʁlsˌʁuːə]; South Franconian: Kallsruh) is the third-largest city of the German state of Baden-Württemberg, after its capital Stuttgart and Mannheim, and the 22nd-largest city in the nation, with 308,436 inhabitants. It is also a former capital of Baden, a historic region named after Hohenbaden Castle in the city of Baden-Baden. Located on the right bank of the Rhine (Upper Rhine) near the French border, between the Mannheim-Ludwigshafen conurbation to the north and Strasbourg to the south, Karlsruhe is Germany's legal center, being home to the Federal Constitutional Court, the Federal Court of Justice and the Public Prosecutor General.

Karlsruhe was the capital of the Margraviate of Baden-Durlach (Durlach: 1565–1718; Karlsruhe: 1718–1771), the Margraviate of Baden (1771–1803), the Electorate of Baden (1803–1806), the Grand Duchy of Baden (1806–1918), and the Republic of Baden (1918–1945). Its most remarkable building is Karlsruhe Palace, which was built in 1715. It contains the Baden State Museum, the large cultural, art and regional history museum of the Baden region of Baden-Württemberg. There are nine institutions of higher education in the city, most notably the Karlsruhe Institute of Technology. Karlsruhe/Baden-Baden Airport is the second-busiest airport in Baden-Württemberg after Stuttgart Airport, and the 17th-busiest airport in Germany.

== Geography ==
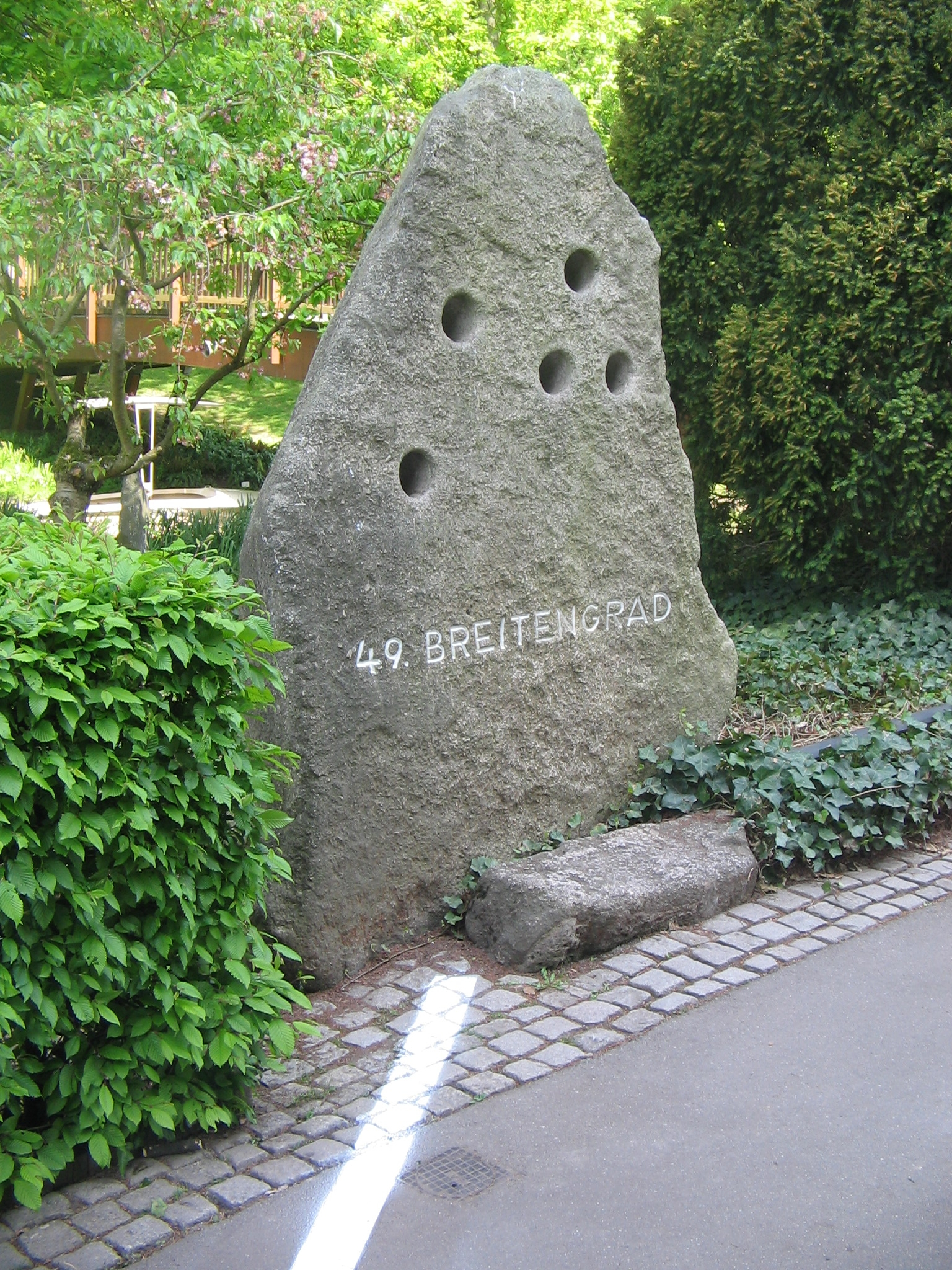
The 49th parallel north in the Karlsruhe Stadtgarten

Karlsruhe lies completely to the east of the Rhine, and almost completely on the Upper Rhine Plain. It contains the Turmberg in the east, and also lies on the borders of the Kraichgau leading to the Northern Black Forest.

The Rhine river, one of the world's most important shipping routes, forms the western limits of the city, beyond which lie the towns of Maximiliansau and Wörth am Rhein in the German state of Rhineland-Palatinate. The city centre is about 7.5 km (4.7 mi) from the river, as measured from the Marktplatz (Market Square). Two tributaries of the Rhine, the Alb and the Pfinz, flow through the city from the Kraichgau to eventually join the Rhine.

The city lies at an altitude of between 100 and 322 m (328 and 1,056 ft), the higher figure being near the communications tower in the suburb of Grünwettersbach. Its geographical coordinates are 49°00′N 8°24′E; the 49th parallel runs through the city centre, which puts it at the same latitude as much of the Canada–United States border and the cities of Vancouver (Canada), Paris (France), Regensburg (Germany), and Hulunbuir (China). Its course is marked by a stone and painted line in the Stadtgarten (municipal park). The total area of the city is 173.46 km^{2} (66.97 sq mi), hence it is the 30th largest city in Germany measured by land area. The longest north–south distance is 16.8 km (10.4 mi) and 19.3 km (12.0 mi) in the east–west direction.

Karlsruhe is part of the urban area of Karlsruhe/Pforzheim, to which certain other towns in the district of Karlsruhe, such as Bruchsal, Ettlingen, Stutensee, and Rheinstetten, as well as the city of Pforzheim, belong.

The city was planned with the palace tower (Schloss) at the center and 32 streets radiating out from it like the spokes of a wheel, or the ribs of a folding fan, so that one nickname for Karlsruhe in German is the "fan city" (Fächerstadt). Almost all of these streets survive to this day. Because of this city layout, in metric geometry, Karlsruhe metric refers to a measure of distance that assumes travel is only possible along radial streets and along circular avenues around the centre.

The city centre is the oldest part of town and lies south of the palace in the quadrant defined by nine of the radial streets. The central part of the palace runs east–west, with two wings, each at a 45° angle, directed southeast and southwest (i.e., parallel with the streets marking the boundaries of the quadrant defining the city center).

The market square lies on the street running south from the palace to Ettlingen. The market square has the town hall (Rathaus) to the west, the main Lutheran church (Evangelische Stadtkirche) to the east, and the tomb of Margrave Charles III William in the Karlsruhe Pyramid in the buildings, resulting in Karlsruhe being one of only three large cities in Germany where buildings are laid out in the neoclassical style.

The area north of the palace is a park and forest. Originally the area to the east of the palace consisted of gardens and forests, some of which remain, but the Karlsruhe Institute of Technology (founded in 1825), Wildparkstadion football stadium, and residential areas have been built there. The area west of the palace is now mostly residential.

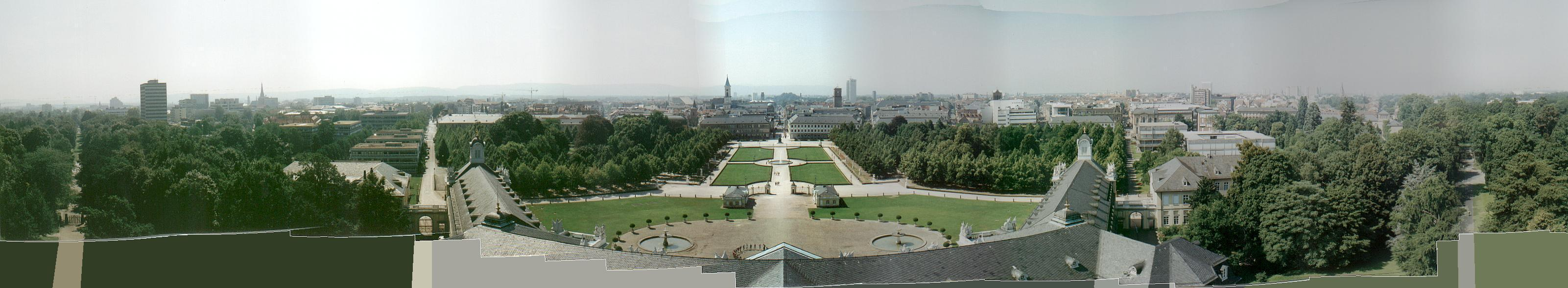
Panorama of Karlsruhe, looking south from the palace tower: The Institute of Technology is on the left, the market square in the centre, the Federal Constitutional Court on the right. Wings of the palace align with streets, all radiating out from the centre of town, i.e., the palace tower.
A 180-degree panorama from atop the palace tower, facing north

=== Climate ===
Karlsruhe experiences an oceanic climate (Köppen: Cfb) with subtropical character and its winter climate is a lot milder, compared to most other German cities, except for the Rhine-Ruhr and North Sea area. Summers are hot with several days registering maximum temperatures between 35 and 40 °C (95 and 104 °F). With an average of around 2,000 sunshine hours a year, it is also one of the brightest cities in the country, like the Rhine-Palatinate region.

Its precipitation or rain-shower occurs mainly during the winter, while in summer it is usually concentrated on single evening thunderstorms. In 2008, the weather station in Karlsruhe, which had been in operation since 1876, was closed; it was replaced by a weather station in Rheinstetten, south of Karlsruhe.

Climate data for Karlsruhe normals 1991-10/2008, Rheinstetten normals 11/2008-2020, extremes 1948–2020
Month	Jan	Feb	Mar	Apr	May	Jun	Jul	Aug	Sep	Oct	Nov	Dec	Year
Record high °C (°F)	17.5 (63.5)	22.0 (71.6)	26.7 (80.1)	30.4 (86.7)	33.3 (91.9)	37.3 (99.1)	39.2 (102.6)	40.2 (104.4)	33.2 (91.8)	29.5 (85.1)	22.0 (71.6)	19.2 (66.6)	40.2 (104.4)
Mean maximum °C (°F)	13.2 (55.8)	15.6 (60.1)	20.3 (68.5)	25.9 (78.6)	29.5 (85.1)	33.3 (91.9)	35.2 (95.4)	34.4 (93.9)	28.7 (83.7)	23.9 (75.0)	17.3 (63.1)	13.5 (56.3)	36.5 (97.7)
Mean daily maximum °C (°F)	5.3 (41.5)	7.3 (45.1)	12.1 (53.8)	17.1 (62.8)	21.0 (69.8)	24.7 (76.5)	27.0 (80.6)	26.8 (80.2)	21.8 (71.2)	16.0 (60.8)	9.5 (49.1)	6.0 (42.8)	16.2 (61.2)
Daily mean °C (°F)	2.5 (36.5)	3.5 (38.3)	7.1 (44.8)	11.2 (52.2)	15.3 (59.5)	18.9 (66.0)	20.8 (69.4)	20.4 (68.7)	15.8 (60.4)	11.1 (52.0)	6.3 (43.3)	3.3 (37.9)	11.4 (52.4)
Mean daily minimum °C (°F)	−0.3 (31.5)	-0.0 (32.0)	2.5 (36.5)	5.3 (41.5)	9.4 (48.9)	13.0 (55.4)	15.0 (59.0)	14.6 (58.3)	10.7 (51.3)	7.1 (44.8)	3.2 (37.8)	0.6 (33.1)	6.8 (44.2)
Mean minimum °C (°F)	−8.7 (16.3)	−7.0 (19.4)	−3.8 (25.2)	−1.4 (29.5)	2.8 (37.0)	7.5 (45.5)	10.2 (50.4)	9.3 (48.7)	5.0 (41.0)	0.4 (32.7)	−3.3 (26.1)	−7.5 (18.5)	−11.3 (11.7)
Record low °C (°F)	−20.0 (−4.0)	−15.9 (3.4)	−14.6 (5.7)	−5.3 (22.5)	−0.9 (30.4)	3.6 (38.5)	6.9 (44.4)	6.3 (43.3)	1.4 (34.5)	−4.1 (24.6)	−9.3 (15.3)	−18.7 (−1.7)	−20.0 (−4.0)
Average precipitation mm (inches)	57.0 (2.24)	52.6 (2.07)	52.4 (2.06)	45.2 (1.78)	75.7 (2.98)	70.2 (2.76)	77.2 (3.04)	62.0 (2.44)	54.8 (2.16)	66.5 (2.62)	64.4 (2.54)	72.0 (2.83)	750 (29.52)
Mean monthly sunshine hours	57.4	85.1	143.7	196.8	223.7	239.7	257.0	239.9	180.8	111.8	60.9	43.0	1,839.8
Source: Data derived from Deutscher Wetterdienst

== Districts ==
Karlsruhe is divided into 27 districts.

== History ==
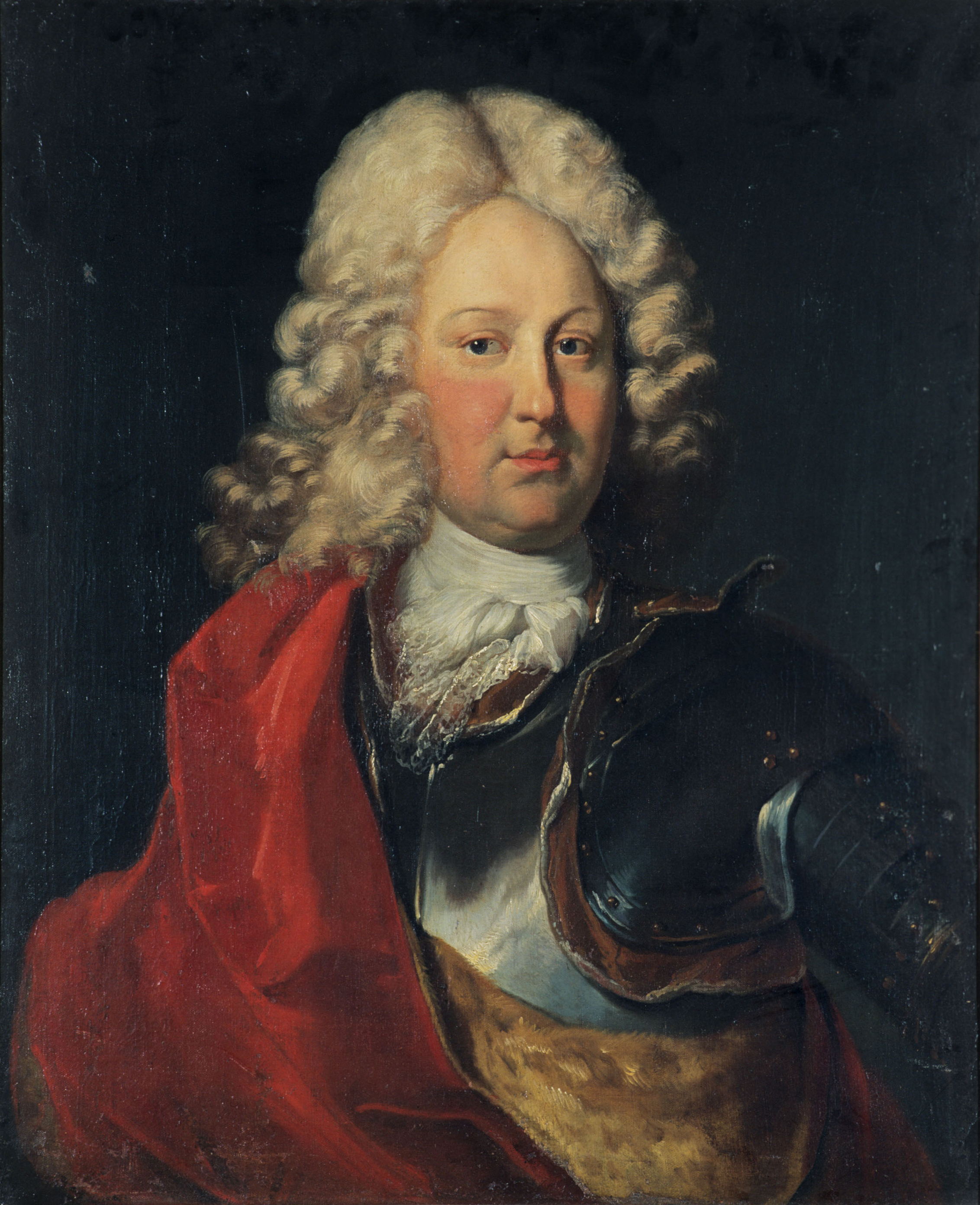
Portrait of Margrave Charles III William, founder of Karlsruhe, by Johann Rudolf Huber, 1710

According to legend, the name Karlsruhe, which translates as "Charles' repose" or "Charles' peace", was given to the new city after a hunting trip when Margrave Charles III William of Baden-Durlach woke from a dream in which he dreamt of founding his new city. A variation of this story claims that he built the new palace to find peace from his wife.

Charles William founded the city on 17 June 1715 after a dispute with the citizens of his previous capital, Durlach. The founding of the city is closely linked to the construction of the palace. Karlsruhe became the capital of Baden-Durlach, and, in 1771, of the united Baden until 1945. Built in 1822, the Ständehaus was the first parliament building in a German state. In the aftermath of the democratic revolution of 1848, a republican government was elected there.

Karlsruhe was visited by Thomas Jefferson during his time as the American envoy to France; when Pierre Charles L'Enfant was planning the layout of Washington, D.C., Jefferson passed to him maps of 12 European towns to consult, one of which was a sketch he had made of Karlsruhe during his visit.

In 1860, the first-ever international professional convention of chemists, the Karlsruhe Congress, was held in the city.

In 1907 the town was site of the Hau Riot where large crowds caused disturbance during the trial of murderer Carl Hau.

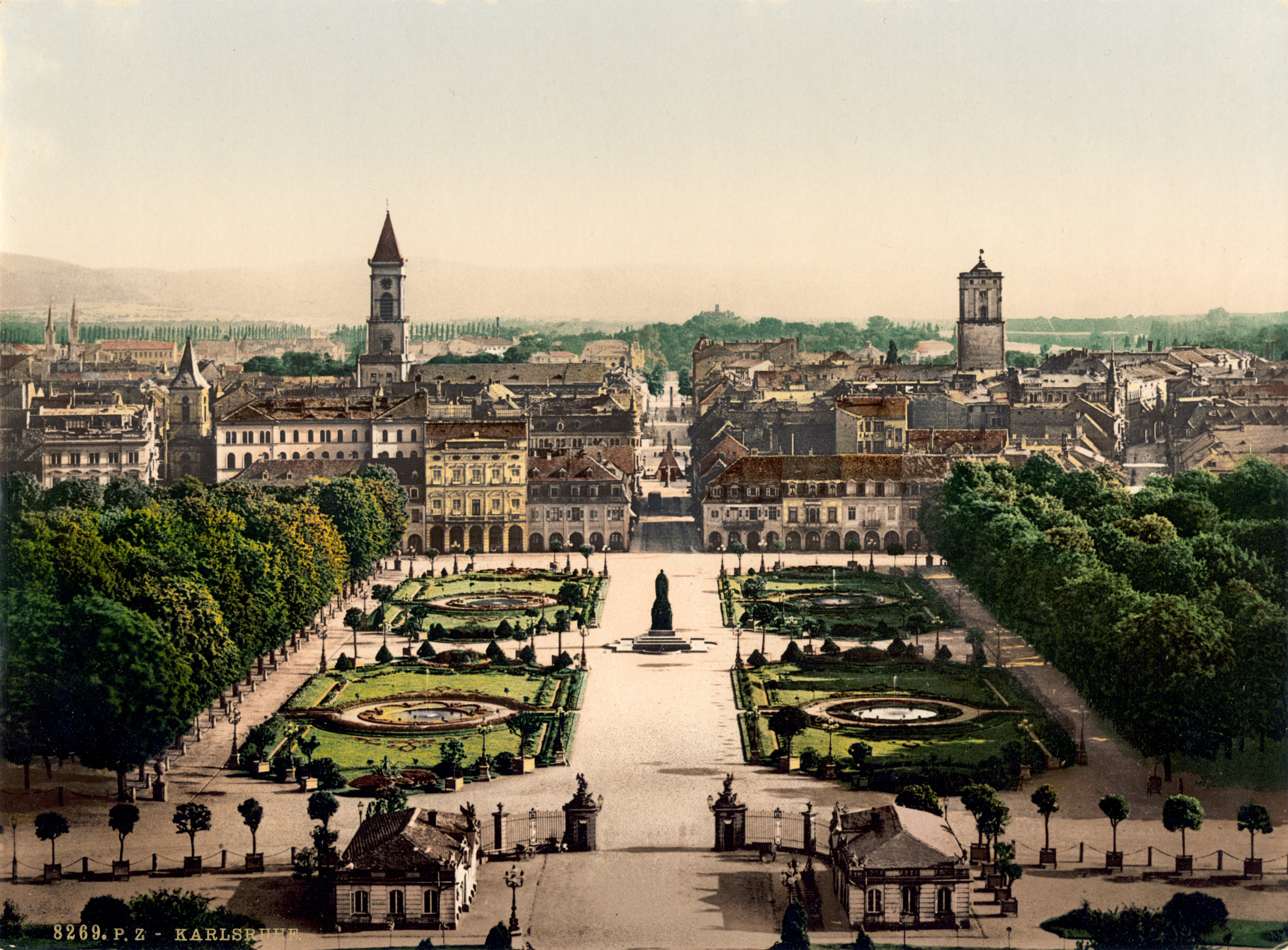
View of Karlsruhe around 1900

During World War I, Karlsruhe was a target of French air raids. On 15 June 1915, 23 French aircraft bombed Karlsruhe, dropping 107 bombs that killed 30 people and injured 68 others. A more devastating air raid followed on 22 June 1916, when French aircraft bombed the city again. The attack, the deadliest air raid on Germany during the war, killed or injured more than 260 people.

On Kristallnacht in 1938, the Adass Jeshurun synagogue was burned to the ground, and the city's Jews were later sent to the Dachau concentration camp, Gurs concentration camp, Theresienstadt, and Auschwitz during the Holocaust, with 1,421 of Karlsruhe's Jews being killed. During World War II, it was the location of a forced labour camp for men, and a subcamp of the Auschwitz concentration camp, whose prisoners were mainly Poles and Russians.

The western city and western part of the central area, including the palace, suffered severe damage by Allied bombing during World War II. The eastern central area and old town remained mostly intact, but was largely demolished by the local mayor in the 1960s and early 70s. In the remaining parts and in Durlach, Kalrsruhe still has a relatively high number of baroque architecture (see "Altstadt" in main sights).

Located in the American zone of the postwar Allied occupation, Karlsruhe was home to an American military base, established in 1945. After the war, the city was part of West Germany until 1990. In 1995, the base closed, and its facilities were turned over to the city of Karlsruhe.

== Population ==
Historical population
Year	Pop.	±%
1720	2,347	—
1770	3,333	+42.0%
1800	7,275	+118.3%
1834	21,047	+189.3%
1871	36,582	+73.8%
1890	73,684	+101.4%
1900	97,185	+31.9%
1919	135,952	+39.9%
1925	145,694	+7.2%
1933	154,902	+6.3%
1939	190,081	+22.7%
1950	201,013	+5.8%
1956	222,237	+10.6%
1961	244,942	+10.2%
1971	258,409	+5.5%
1976	276,620	+7.0%
1981	271,877	−1.7%
1986	268,309	−1.3%
1990	275,061	+2.5%
2001	279,578	+1.6%
2011	289,173	+3.4%
2022	305,408	+5.6%
Population size may be affected by changes in administrative divisions.

Karlsruhe has a population of about 310,000 and is the 3rd largest city in Baden-Württemberg. Karlsruhe, which was founded by Charles III William, became a major city in the 19th century. In the 1950s, Karlsruhe became a significant city where the population started to grow. It gained a large student population due to the university of technology and media arts. Karlsruhe reached populations of 200,000 in 1950 and 300,000 in 2014.

Rank	Nationality	Population (31 December 2022)
1	Romania	6,369
2	Turkey	5,618
3	Italy	4,568
4	Ukraine	3,637
5	Croatia	3,433
6	Poland	3,089
7	China	2,542
8	France	2,352
9	Serbia	1,746
10	Russia	1,712
11	Spain	1,502
12	Bulgaria	1,384
13	Hungary	1,294
14	Greece	1,258
15	India	1,183

== Main sights ==
The Stadtgarten is a recreational area near the main railway station (Hauptbahnhof) and was rebuilt for the 1967 Federal Garden Show (Bundesgartenschau). It is also the site of the Karlsruhe Zoo.

The Durlacher Turmberg has a lookout tower (hence its name). It is a former keep dating back to the 13th century.

The city has two botanical gardens: the municipal Botanischer Garten Karlsruhe, which forms part of the Palace complex, and the Botanical Garden of the KIT, which is maintained by the university.

Panorama of the courtyard of Botanischer Garten Karlsruhe

The Marktplatz has a stone pyramid marking the grave of the city's founder. Built in 1825, it is the emblem of Karlsruhe. The city is nicknamed the "fan city" (die Fächerstadt) because of its design layout, with straight streets radiating fan-like from the Palace.

The Karlsruhe Palace (Schloss) is an interesting piece of architecture; the adjacent Schlossgarten includes the Botanical Garden with a palm, cactus and orchid house, and walking paths through the woods to the north.

The so-called Kleine Kirche (Little Church), built between 1773 and 1776, is the oldest church of Karlsruhe's city centre.

The architect Friedrich Weinbrenner designed many of the city's most important sights. Another sight is the Rondellplatz with its 'Constitution Building Columns' (1826). It is dedicated to Baden's first constitution in 1818, which was one of the most liberal of its time. The Münze (mint), erected in 1826/27, was also built by Weinbrenner.

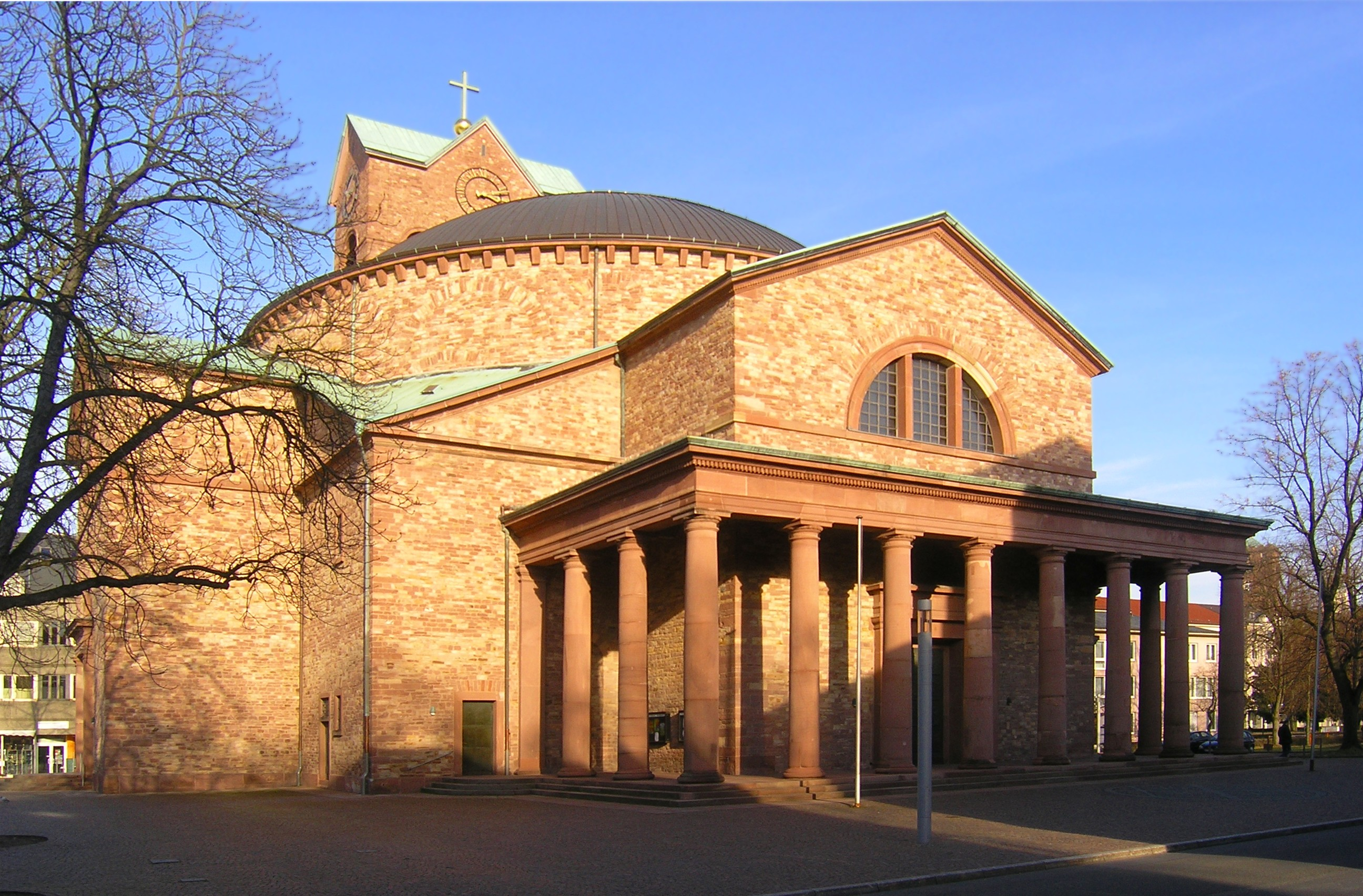
St. Stephan parish church

The St. Stephan parish church is one of the masterpieces of neoclassical church architecture in. Weinbrenner, who built this church between 1808 and 1814, orientated it to the Pantheon, Rome.

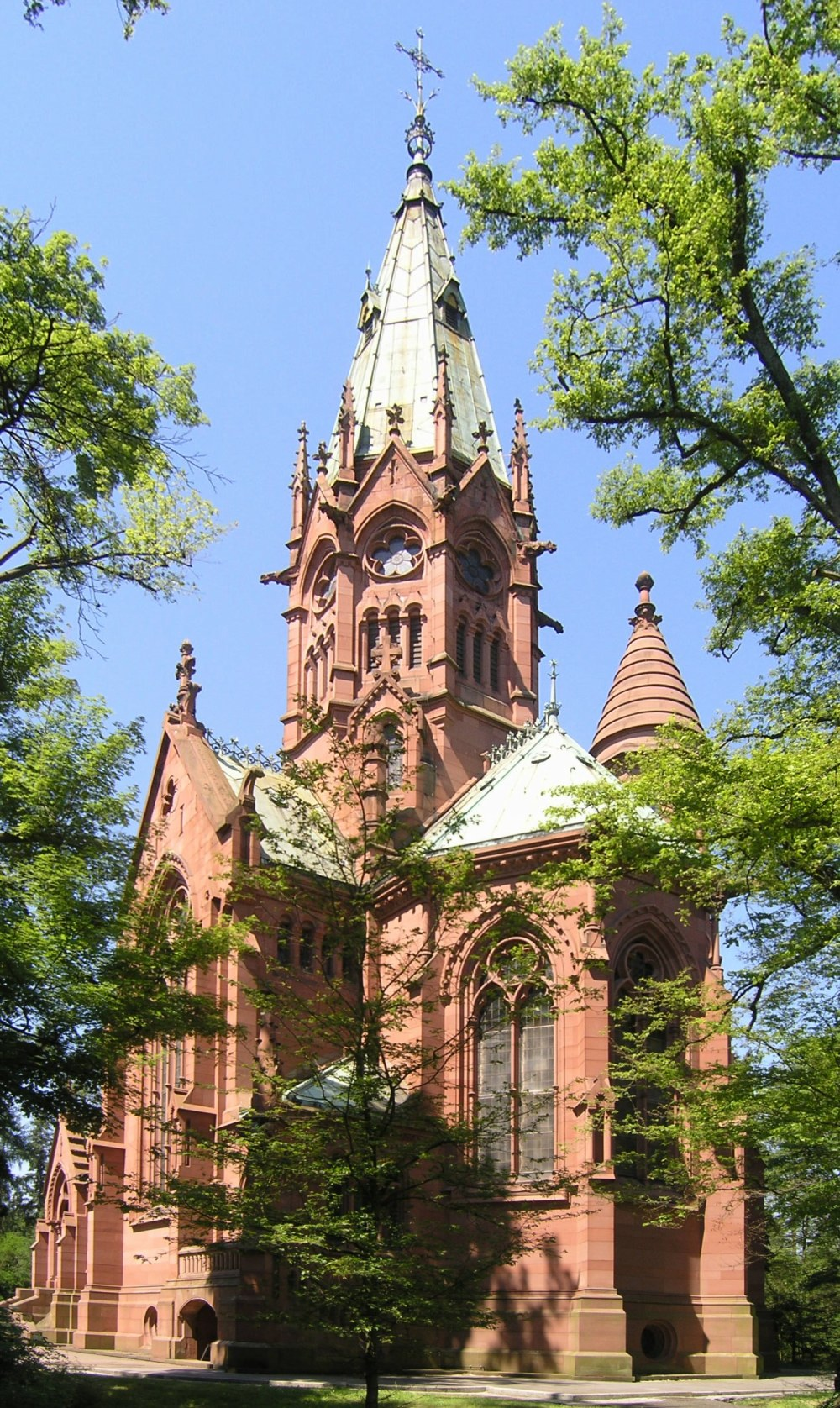
Grand Ducal burial chapel (Sepulchral chapel of the Grand Duchy of Baden in Karlsruhe)

The neo-Gothic Grand Ducal Burial Chapel, built between 1889 and 1896, is a mausoleum rather than a church, and is located in the middle of the forest.

The main cemetery of Karlsruhe is the oldest park-like cemetery in Germany. The crematorium was the first to be built in the style of a church.

Karlsruhe is also home to a natural history museum (the State Museum of Natural History Karlsruhe), an opera house (the Baden State Theatre), as well as a number of independent theatres and art galleries. The State Art Gallery, built in 1846 by Heinrich Hübsch, displays paintings and sculptures from six centuries, particularly from France, Germany and Holland. Karlsruhe's newly renovated art museum is one of the most important art museums in Baden-Württemberg. Further cultural attractions are scattered throughout Karlsruhe's various incorporated suburbs. Established in 1924, the Scheffel Association is the largest literary society in Germany. Today the Prinz-Max-Palais, built between 1881 and 1884 in neoclassical style, houses the organisation and includes its museum.

Due to population growth in the late 19th century, Karlsruhe developed several suburban areas (Vorstadt) in the Gründerzeit and especially Art Nouveau styles of architecture, with many preserved examples.

Karlsruhe is also home to the Majolika-Manufaktur, the only art-ceramics pottery studio in Germany. Founded in 1901, it is located in the Schlossgarten. A 'blue streak' (Blauer Strahl) consisting of 1,645 ceramic tiles, connects the studio with the Palace. It is the world's largest ceramic artwork.

Another tourist attraction is the Centre for Art and Media (Zentrum für Kunst und Medientechnologie, or ZKM), which is located in a converted ammunition factory.

== Government ==
=== Justice ===
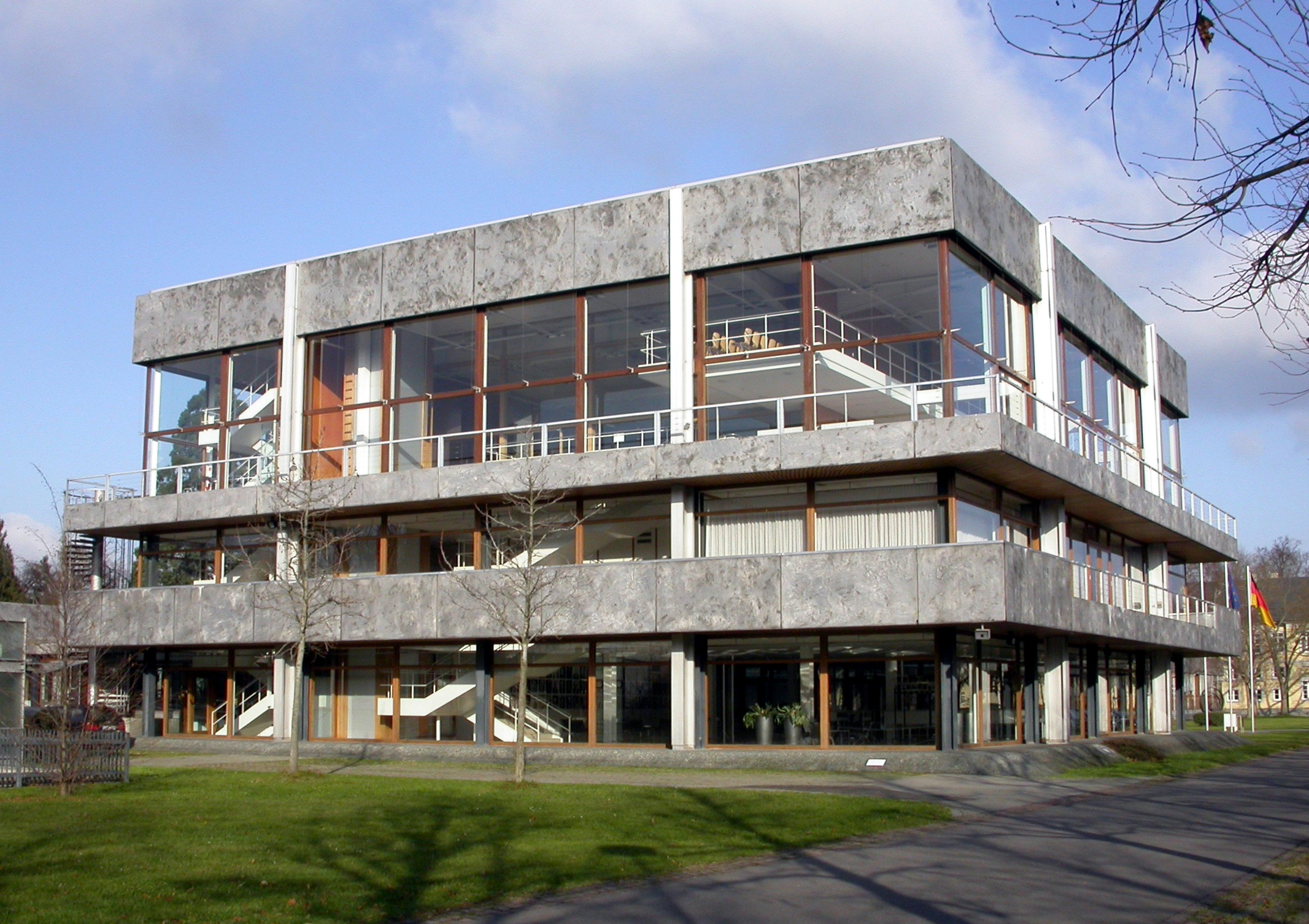
The Federal Constitutional Court of Germany

Karlsruhe is the seat of the German Federal Constitutional Court (Bundesverfassungsgericht) and the highest Court of Appeals in civil and criminal cases, the Bundesgerichtshof. The courts came to Karlsruhe after World War II, when the provinces of Baden and Württemberg were merged. Stuttgart, capital of Württemberg, became the capital of the new province (Württemberg-Baden in 1945 and Baden-Württemberg in 1952). In compensation for the state authorities relocated to Stuttgart, Karlsruhe applied to become the seat of the high court.

=== Public health ===
There are four hospitals: The Karlsruhe Municipal Hospital provides the maximum level of medical services, the St. Vincentius-Kliniken and the Diakonissenkrankenhaus, connected to the Catholic and Protestant churches, respectively, offer central services, and the private Paracelsus-Klinik basic medical care, according to state hospital demand planning.

== Economy ==
Germany's largest oil refinery is located in Karlsruhe, at the western edge of the city, directly on the river Rhine. The Technologieregion Karlsruhe is a loose confederation of the region's cities to promote high tech industries; today, about 20% of the region's jobs are in research and development. EnBW, one of Germany's biggest electric utility companies, with a revenue of €19.2 billion in 2012, is headquartered in the city.

=== Internet activities ===
Due to the Karlsruhe Institute of Technology providing services until the late 1990, Karlsruhe became known as the internet capital of Germany. The DENIC, Germany's network information centre, has since moved to Frankfurt, though, where DE-CIX is located.

Two major internet service providers, WEB.DE and schlund+partner/1&1, now both owned by United Internet AG, are located at Karlsruhe.

The library of the Karlsruhe Institute of Technology developed the Karlsruher Virtueller Katalog, the first internet site that allowed researchers worldwide (for free) to search multiple library catalogues worldwide.

In 2000, the regional online newspaper ka-news.de was created. As a daily newspaper, it not only provides the news, but also informs readers about upcoming events in Karlsruhe and surrounding areas.

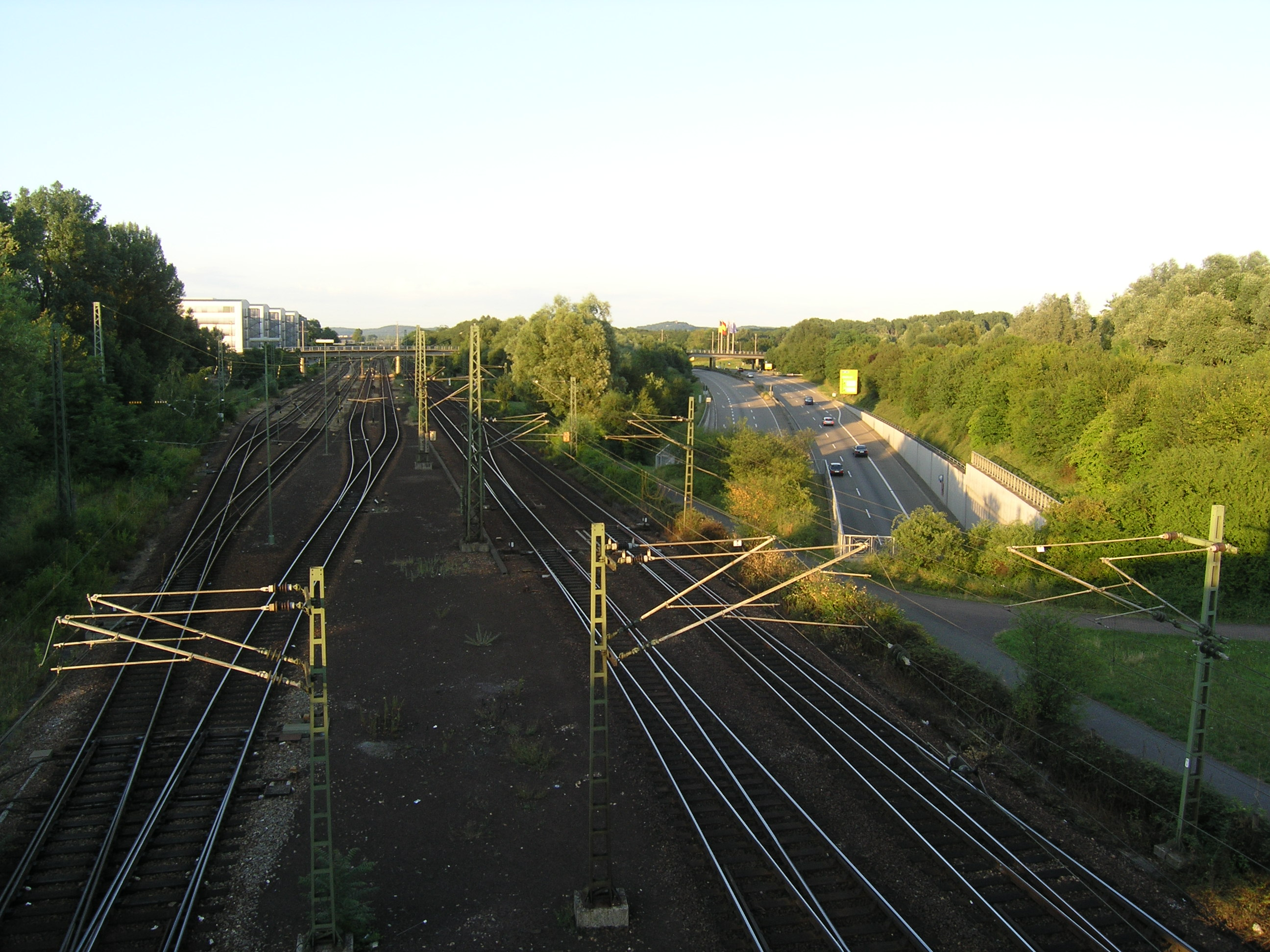
Rail yard, bypass road Südtangente

In addition to established companies, Karlsruhe has a startup community with well-known startups. Together, the local high tech industry is responsible for over 22,000 jobs.

== Politics ==
=== Mayor ===
The results of the 2020 mayoral election

The current mayor of Karlsruhe is Frank Mentrup of the Social Democratic Party (SPD) since 2013. The most recent mayoral election was held on 6 December 2020, and the results were as follows:

Candidate	Party	Votes	%
Frank Mentrup	SPD/Green	50,064	52.6
Sven Weigt	CDU/FDP	24,158	25.4
Petra Lorenz	Free Voters/For Karlsruhe	8,303	8.7
Paul Schmidt	Alternative for Germany	3,914	4.1
Vanessa Schulz	Die PARTEI	2,660	2.8
Marc Nehlig	Independent	6,065	6.4
Other		97	0.1
Valid votes		95,261	99.6
Invalid votes		430	0.4
Total		95,961	100.0
Electorate/voter turnout		231,335	41.4
Source: City of Karlsruhe

==== List of mayors ====
After the castle was founded in 1715, there was also a settlement in which a mayor was appointed from 1718. From 1812 the mayors received the title of Lord Mayor.

In addition to the Lord Mayor, there are five other mayors.

Mayor for:

- Human Resources, Elections and Statistics, Citizen Service and Security, Culture
- Youth and social affairs, schools, sports, pools
- Finance, economy and work, city marketing, congresses, exhibitions and events, tourism, supply and ports, real estate and market affairs
- Environment and climate protection, health, cemetery office, waste management, forestry, fire and disaster control
- Planning, building, real estate management, people's apartment and zoo

==== List of Mayors ====
Name	Time	Party
Johannes Sembach	1718–1720	
Johannes Ludwig	1721–1723	
Georg Adam Ottmann	1724–1733	
Johannes Ernst Kaufmann	1733–1738	
Johann Cornelius Roman	1738–1744	
Johannes Ernst Kaufmann	1744–1746	
Johann Christian Maschenbauer	1746–1750	
Johann Cornelius Roman	1750–1753	
Johann Sebald Kreglinger	1753–1763	
Johann Cornelius Roman	1763–1765	
Georg Jakob Fink	1765–1773	
Christoph Hennig	1773–1781	
Christian Ludwig Schulz	1781–1799	
Georg Friedrich Trohmann	1799–1800	
Gabriel Bauer	1800–1809	
Wilhelm Christian Griesbach	1809–1816	
Bernhard Dollmaetsch	1816–1830	
August Klose	1830–1833	
Christian Karl Füeßlin	1833–1847	
August Klose	1847 (May–September)	
Ludwig Daler	1847–1848	
Jakob Malsch	1848–1870	
Wilhelm Florentin Lauter	1870–1892	
Karl Schnetzler	1892–1906	
Karl Siegrist	1906–1919	
Julius Finter	1919–1933	DDP
Friedrich Jäger	1933–1938	NSDAP
Oskar Hüssy	1938–1945	NSDAP
Josef Heinrich	1945 (April–August)	
Hermann Veit	1945–1946	SPD
Friedrich Töpper	1946–1952	SPD
Günther Klotz	1952–1970	SPD
Otto Dullenkopf	1970–1986	CDU
Gerhard Seiler	1986–1998	CDU
Heinz Fenrich	1998–2013	CDU
Frank Mentrup	since 2013	SPD

=== City council ===
The Karlsruhe city council governs the city alongside the Mayor. The most recent city council election was held on 9 June 2024, and the results were as follows:

Party	Votes	%	+/-	Seats	+/-
Alliance 90/The Greens (Grüne)	1,546,887	25.6	▼4.5	12	▼3
Christian Democratic Union (CDU)	1,186,644	19.6	▲0.9	10	▲1
Social Democratic Party (SPD)	749,043	12.4	▼1.9	6	▼1
Alternative for Germany (AfD)	606,048	10.0	▲2.9	5	▲2
Free Democratic Party (FDP)	377,480	6.2	▼1.1	3	▼1
Volt Germany (Volt)	351,295	5.8	New	3	New
The Left (Die Linke)	335,309	5.5	▼1.5	3	0.0
Karlsruher List (KAL)	322,146	5.3	▲0.3	3	▲1
Die PARTEI	183,083	3.0	▼1.6	1	▼1
Free Voters Karlsruhe (FW KA)	179,500	3.0	▼0.2	1	▼1
For Karlsruhe (FÜR)	122,453	2.0	▼0.7	1	▼1
Democracy and Education Karlsruhe	35,315	0.6	New	0	New
Ecological Democratic Party (ÖDP)	31,066	0.5	New	0	New
KAG	12,546	0.2	New	0	New
Team Todenhöfer	8,463	0.1	New	0	New
Valid votes	6,047,278	100.0		48	±0
Invalid ballots	2,702	2.0			
Total ballots	138,198	100.0			
Electorate/voter turnout	225,262	61.4	▲2.7		
Source: City of Karlsruhe

== Transport ==
=== Railway ===
Nightjet train in Karlsruhe Hbf

VBK Verkehrsbetriebe Karlsruhe (lit. 'Karlsruhe Transport Company') operates the city's urban public transport network, comprising seven tram routes and a network of bus routes. All city areas can be reached round the clock by tram and a night bus system. The Turmbergbahn funicular railway, to the east of the city centre, is also operated by the VBK. A new section of tram tunnel through central Karlsruhe was completed in December 2021.

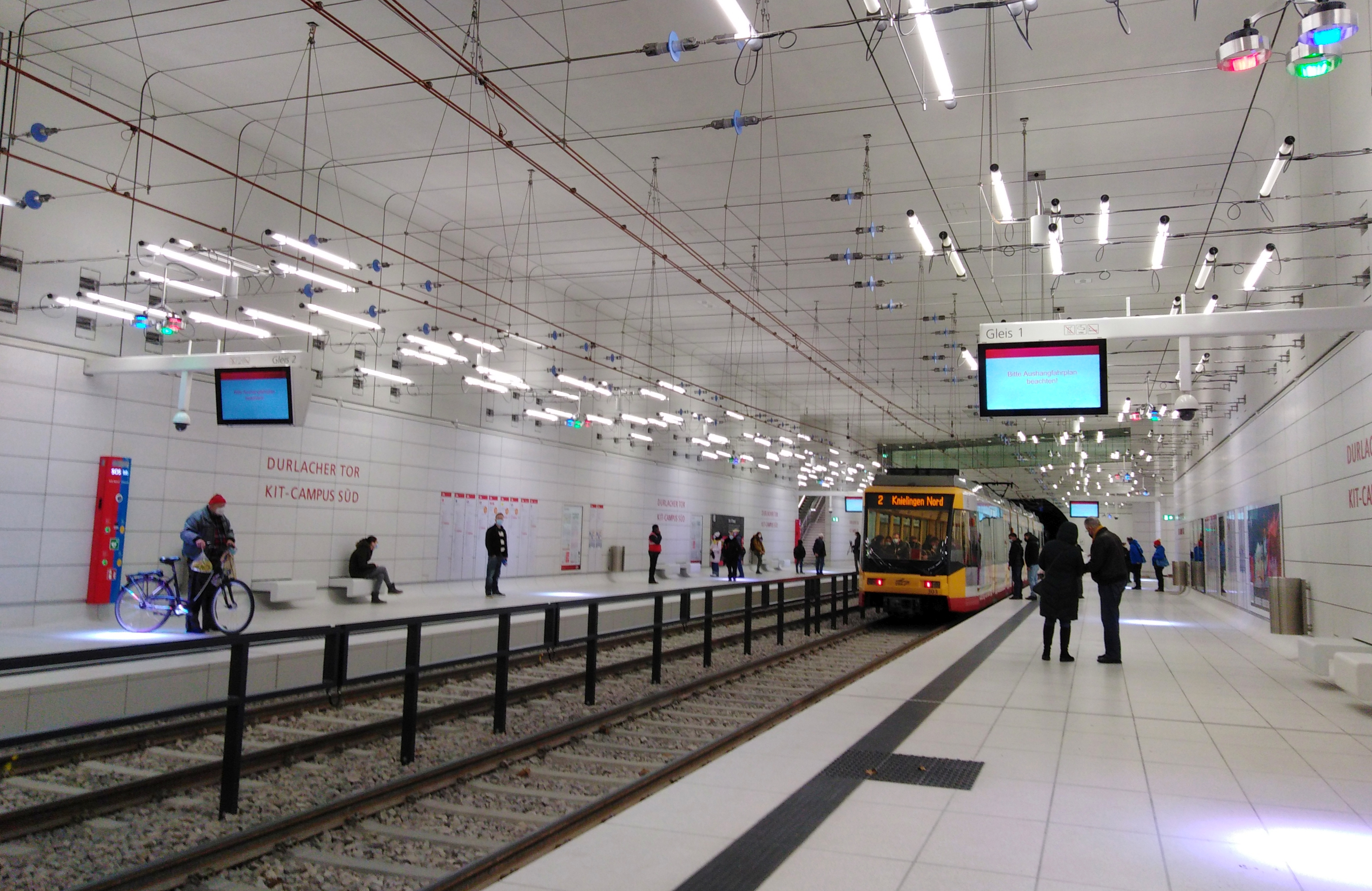
A tram at the subterranean Durlacher Tor – KIT Campus Süd station

The VBK is also a partner, with the Albtal-Verkehrs-Gesellschaft and Deutsche Bahn, in the operation of the Karlsruhe Stadtbahn, the rail system that serves a larger area around the city. This system makes it possible to reach other towns in the region, like Ettlingen, Wörth am Rhein, Pforzheim, Bad Wildbad, Bretten, Bruchsal, Heilbronn, Baden-Baden, and even Freudenstadt in the Black Forest right from the city centre. The Stadtbahn is known for pioneering the concept of operating trams on train tracks, to achieve a more effective and attractive public transport system.

Karlsruhe is connected via road and rail, with Autobahn and Intercity Express connections going to Frankfurt, Stuttgart/Munich and Freiburg/Basel from Karlsruhe Hauptbahnhof. Since June 2007 it has been connected to the TGV network, reducing travel time to Paris to three hours (previously it had taken five hours).

The Rhine Valley Railway is also an important freight line. Freight trains can bypass Karlsuhe Hauptbahnhof via the Karlsruhe freight bypass railway.

=== Shipping ===
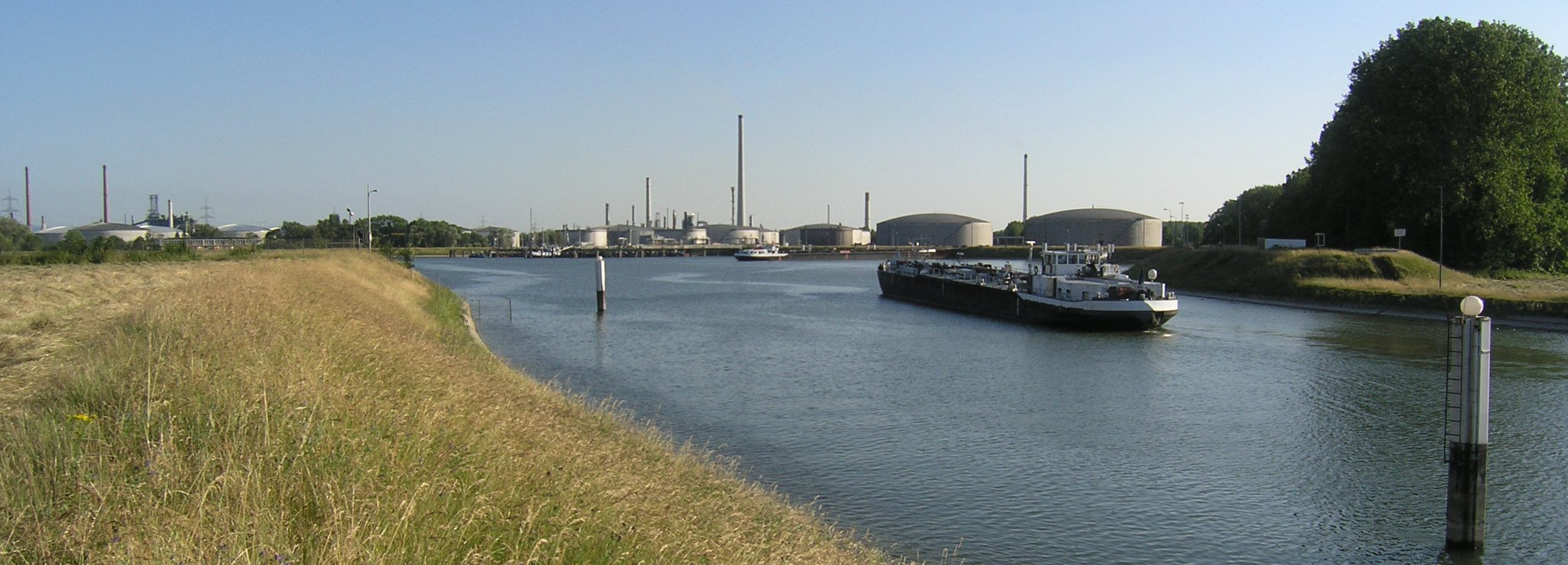
Oil port

Two ports on the Rhine provide transport capacity on cargo ships, especially for petroleum products.

=== Airport ===
The nearest airport is part of the Baden Airpark (officially Flughafen Karlsruhe/Baden-Baden) about 45 km (28 mi) southwest of Karlsruhe, with regular connections to airports in Germany and Europe in general. Frankfurt International Airport can be reached in about an hour and a half by car (one hour by Intercity Express); Stuttgart Airport can be reached in about one hour (about an hour and a half by train and S-Bahn). Karlsruhe also has an area control centre for flights at 24,500 feet in altitude and above over southern and eastern Germany.

=== Streets ===
Karlsruhe is at the Bundesautobahn 5 and the Bundesstraße 10. In the city there is a good bike lane infrastructure.

Two interesting facts in transportation history are that both Karl Drais, the inventor of the bicycle, as well as Karl Benz, the inventor of the automobile were born in Karlsruhe. Benz was born in Mühlburg, which later became a borough of Karlsruhe (in 1886). Benz also studied at the Karlsruhe University. Benz's wife Bertha took the world's first long distance-drive with an automobile from Mannheim to Karlsruhe-Grötzingen and Pforzheim (see Bertha Benz Memorial Route). Their professional lives led both men to the neighboring city of Mannheim, where they first applied their most famous inventions.

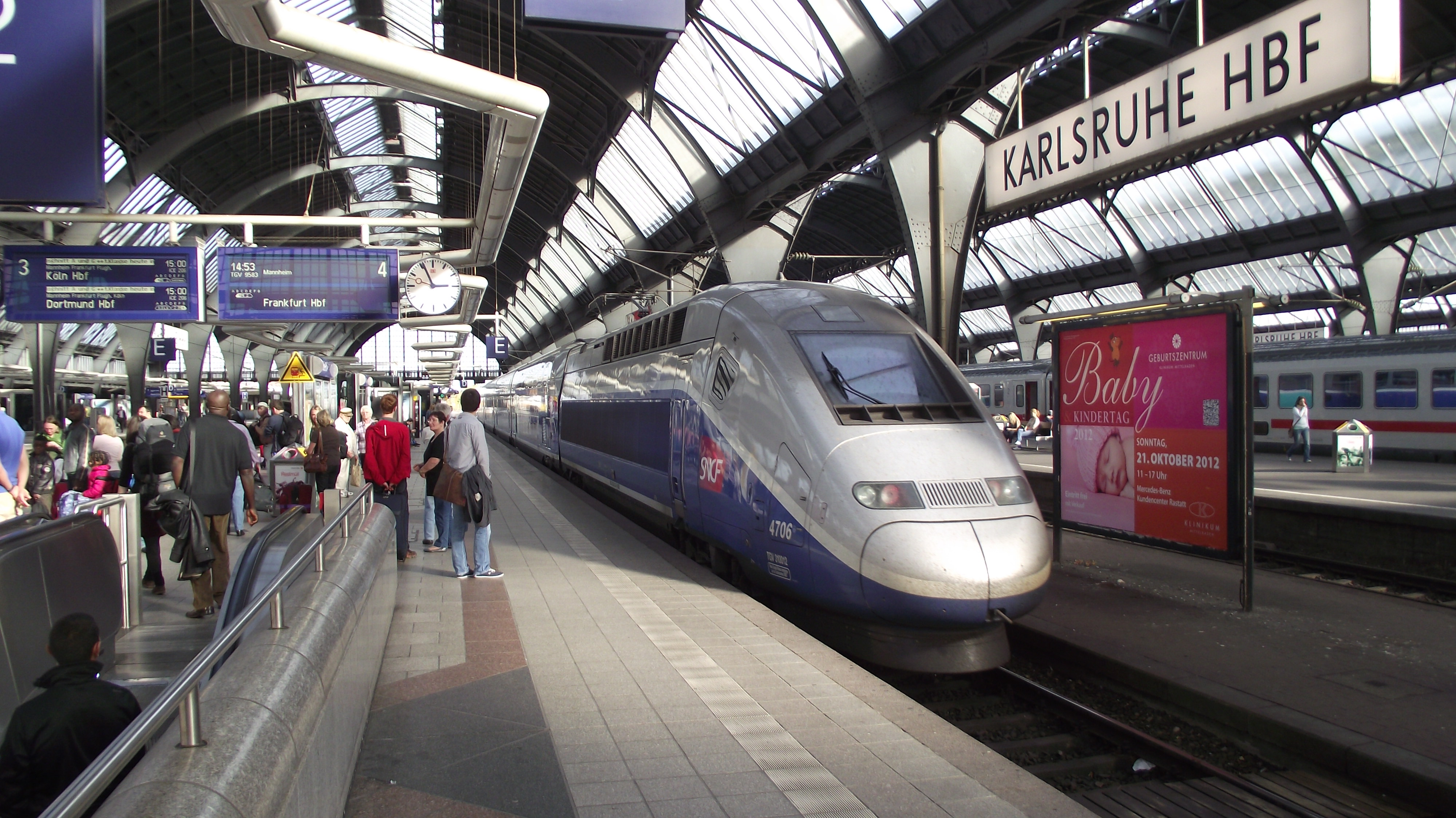
The Karlsruhe Hauptbahnhof, the main station in Karlsruhe

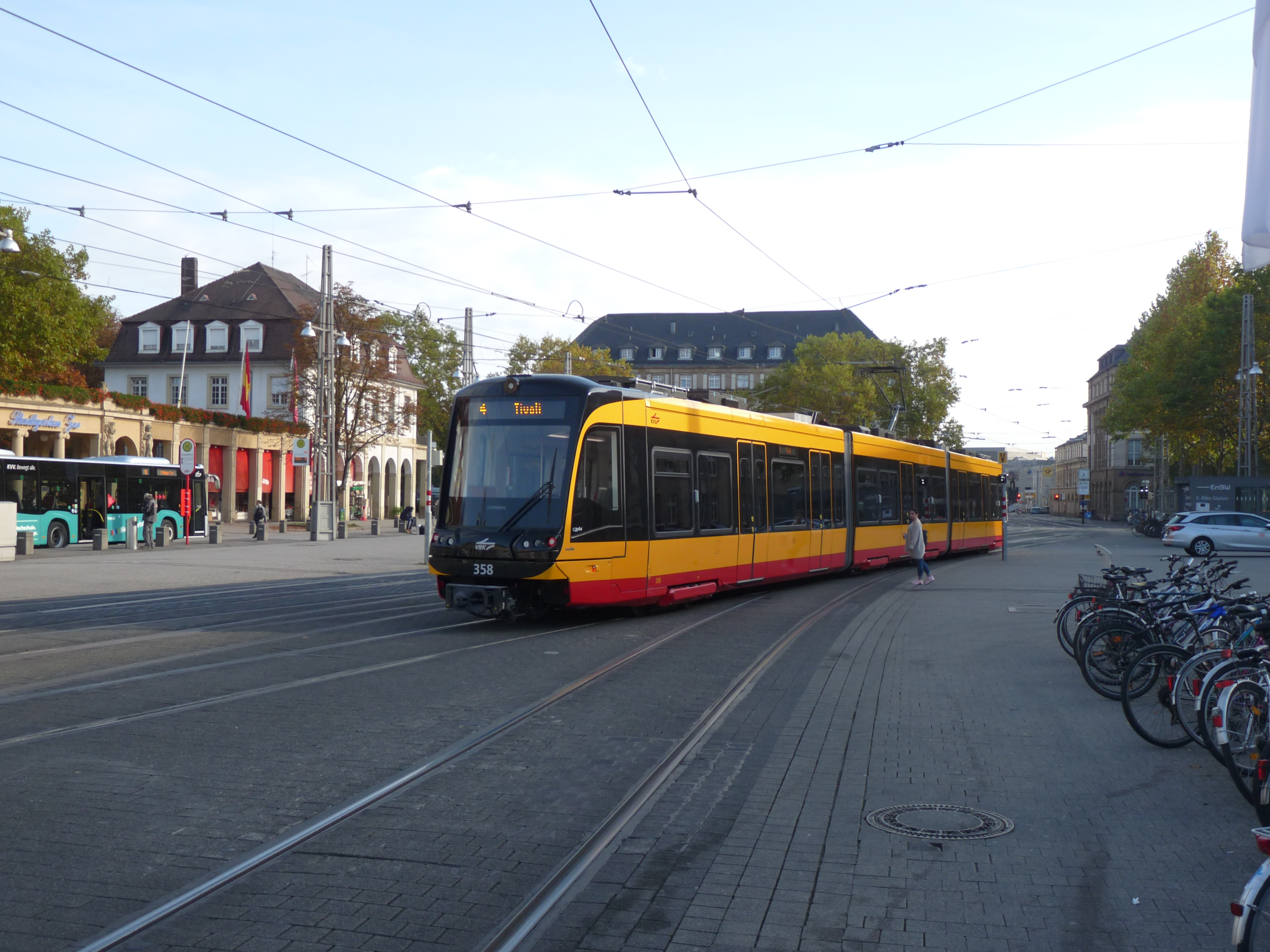
A tram in Karlsruhe, 2017

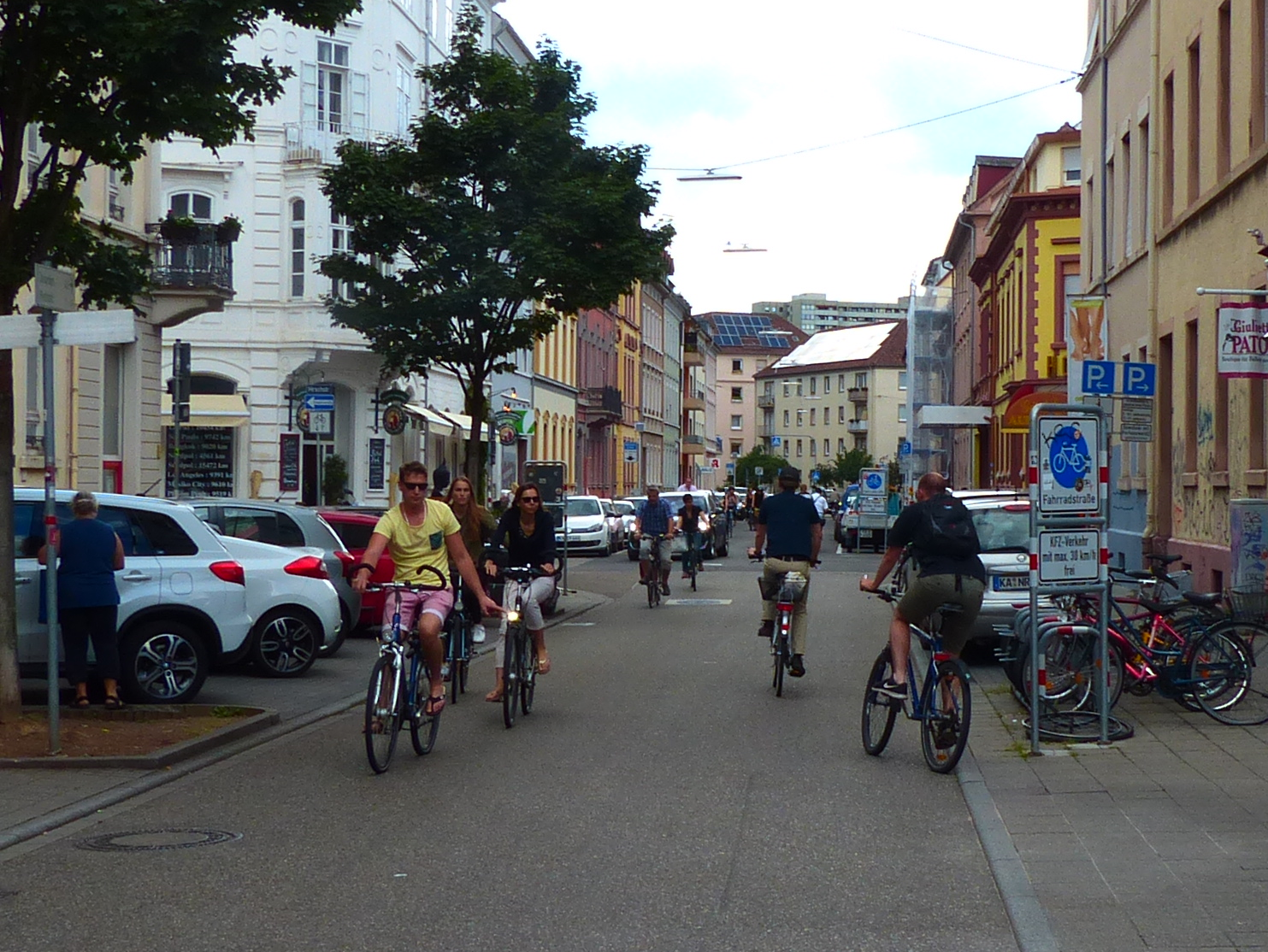
A bike street in Karlsruhe

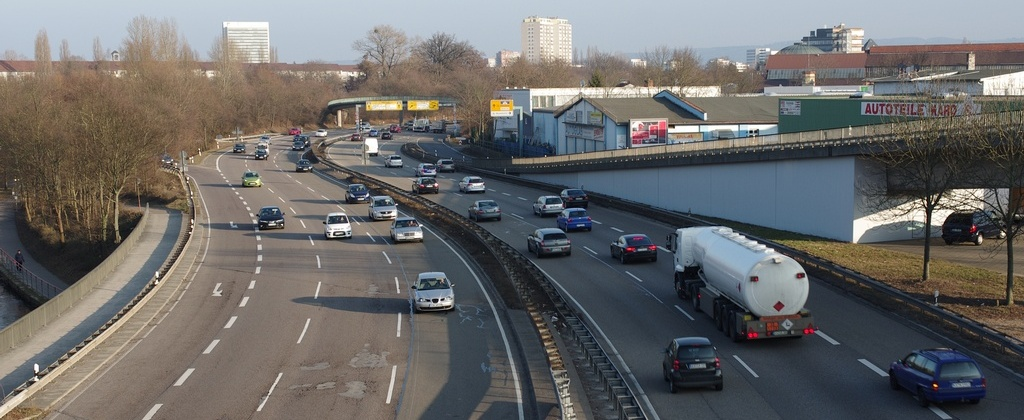
The Bundesstraße 10 in Karlsruhe

== Jewish community ==
Jews settled in Karlsruhe soon after its founding. They were attracted by the numerous privileges granted by its founder to settlers, without discrimination as to creed. Official documents attest the presence of several Jewish families at Karlsruhe in 1717. A year later the city council addressed to the margrave a report in which a question was raised as to the proportion of municipal charges to be borne by the newly arrived Jews, who in that year formed an organized congregation, with Rabbi Nathan Uri Kohen of Metz at its head. A document dated 1726 gives the names of twenty-four Jews who had taken part in an election of municipal officers.

As the city grew, permission to settle there became less easily obtained by Jews, and the community developed more slowly. A 1752 Jewry ordinance stated Jews were forbidden to leave the city on Sundays and Christian holidays, or to go out of their houses during church services, but they were exempted from service by court summonses on Sabbaths. They could sell wine only in inns owned by Jews and graze their cattle, not on the commons, but on the wayside only. Nethanael Weill was a rabbi in Karlsruhe from 1750 until his death.

In 1783, by a decree issued by Margrave Charles Frederick of Baden, the Jews ceased to be serfs, and consequently could settle wherever they pleased. The same decree freed them from the Todfall tax, paid to the clergy for each Jewish burial. In commemoration of these changes special prayers were prepared by the acting rabbi Jedidiah Tiah Weill, who, succeeding his father in 1770, held the office until 1805.

In 1808 the new constitution of what at that time, during the Napoleonic era, had become the Grand Duchy of Baden granted Jews citizenship status; a subsequent edict, in 1809, constitutionally acknowledged Jews as a religious group. The latter edict provided for a hierarchical organization of the Jewish communities of Baden, under the umbrella of a central council of Baden Jewry (Oberrat der Israeliten Badens), with its seat in Karlsruhe, and the appointment of a chief rabbi of Karlsruhe, as the spiritual head of the Jews in all of Baden. The first chief rabbi of Karlsruhe and Baden was Rabbi Asher Loew, who served from 1809 until his death in 1837.

Complete emancipation was given in 1862, Jews were elected to city council and Baden parliament, and from 1890 were appointed judges. Jews were persecuted in the 'Hep-Hep' riots that occurred in 1819; and anti-Jewish demonstrations were held in 1843, 1848, and the 1880s. The well-known German-Israeli artist Leo Kahn studied in Karlsruhe before leaving for France and Israel in the 1920s and 1930s.

Today, there are about 900 members in the Jewish community, many of whom are recent immigrants from Russia, and an orthodox rabbi.

Karlsruhe has memorialized its Jewish community and notable pre-war synagogues with a memorial park.

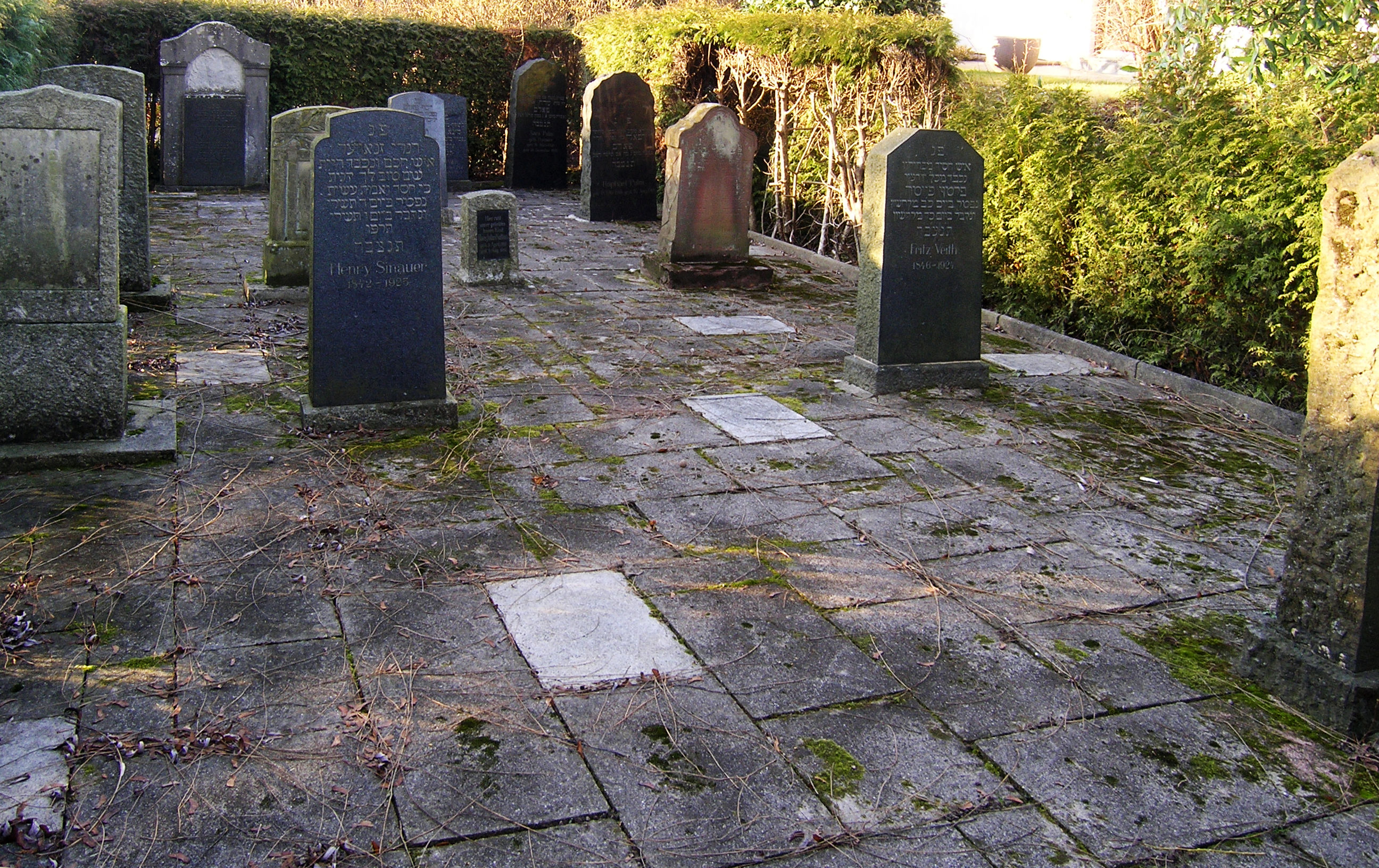
Jewish cemetery of Grötzingen

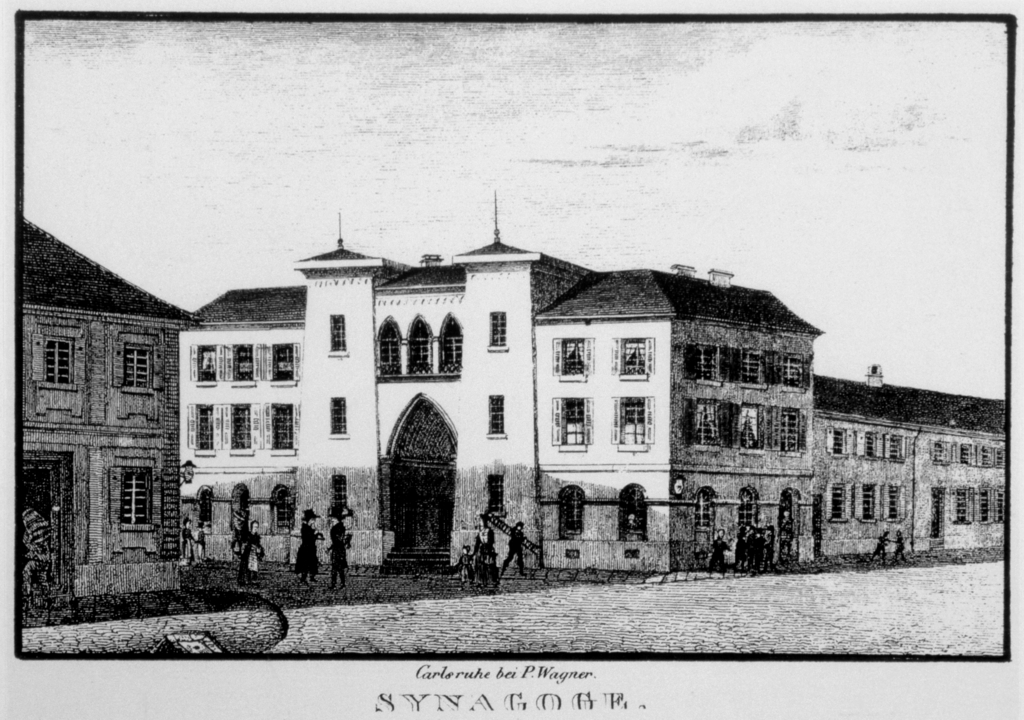
The Karlsruhe Synagogue, built by Friedrich Weinbrenner in 1798 (existed until 1871)

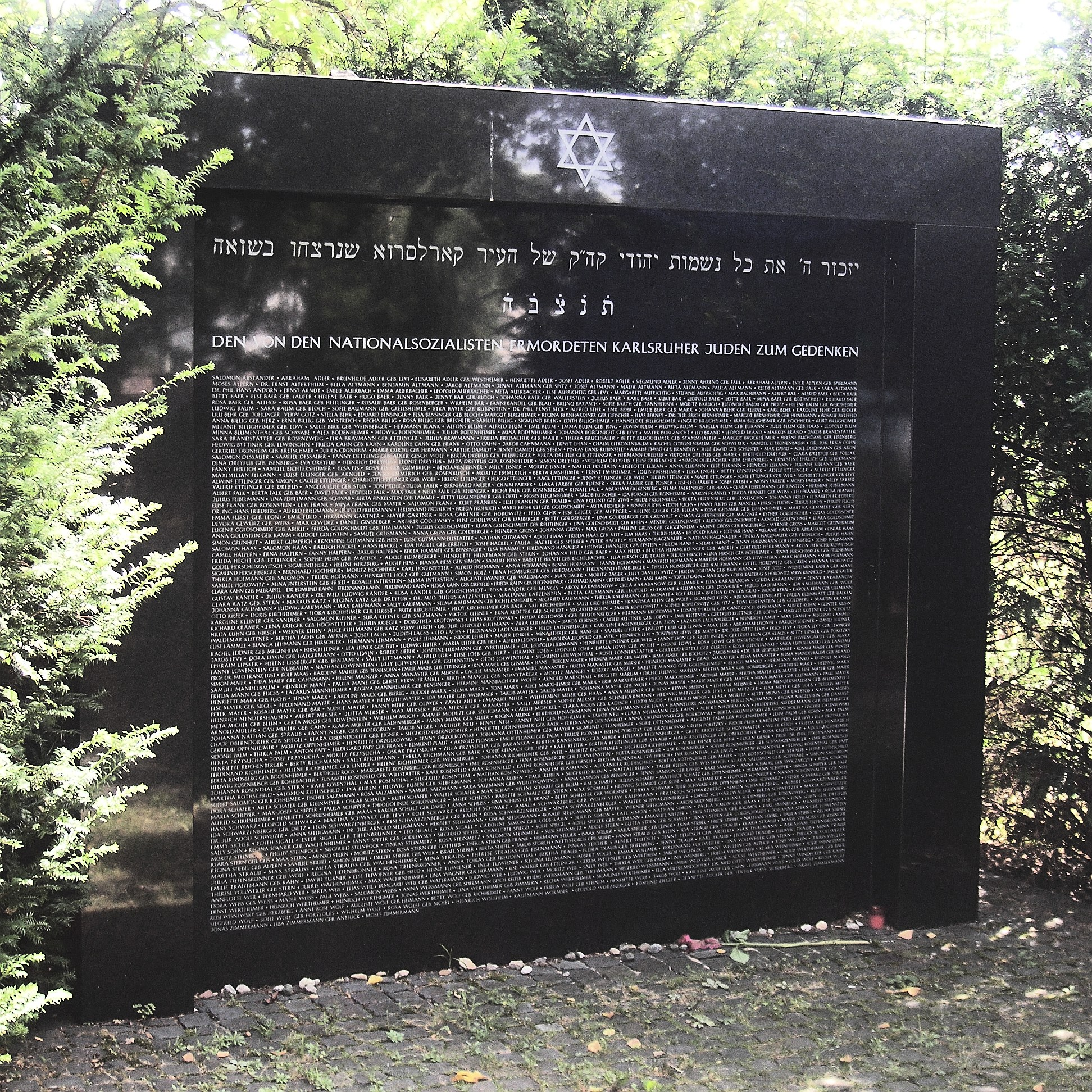
Holocaust memorial

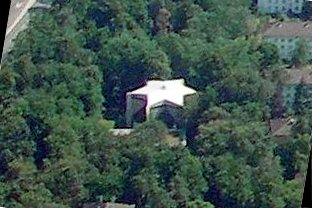
The new synagogue

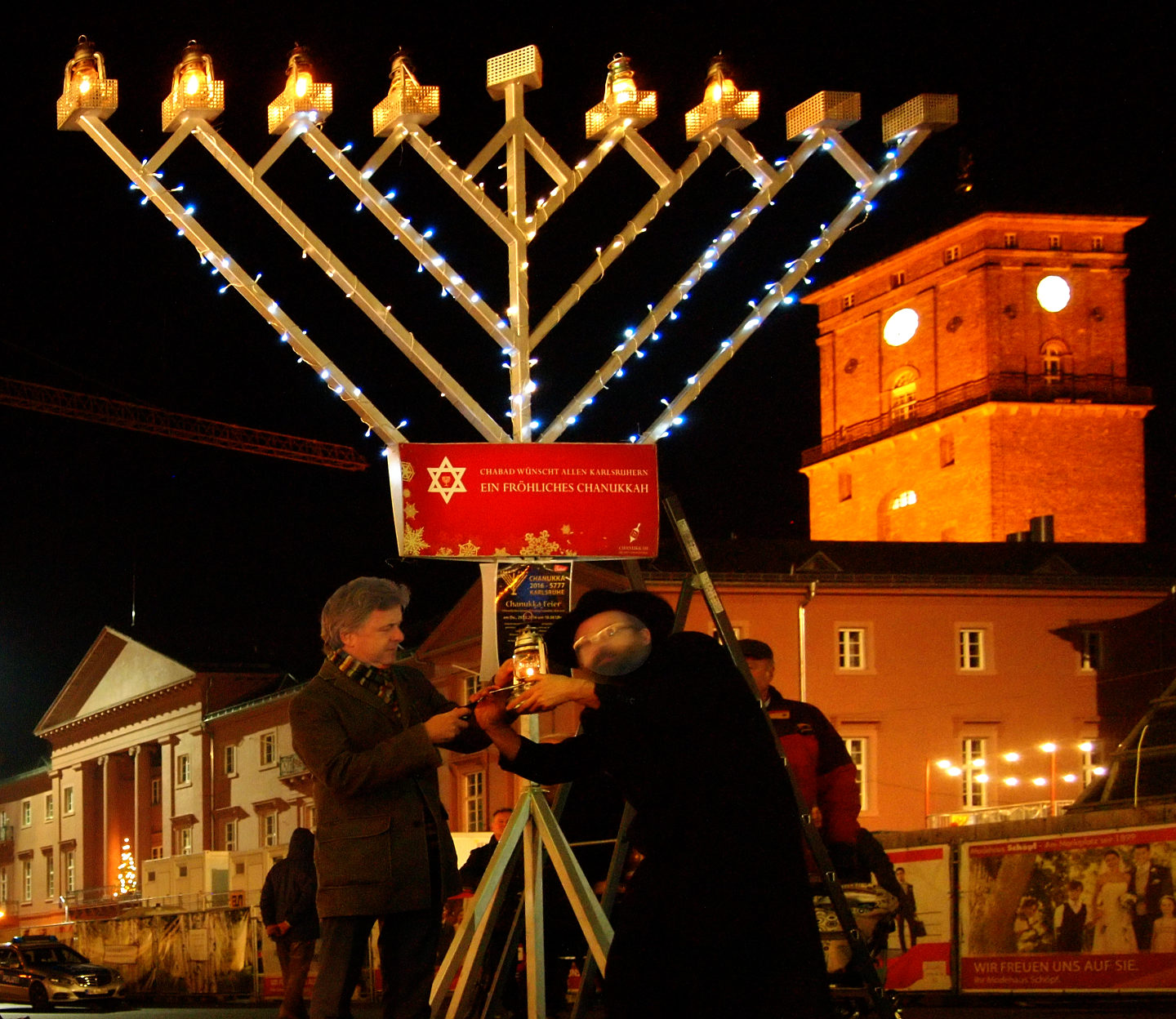
Public menorah on the Marktplatz

=== Karlsruhe and the Holocaust ===
On 28 October 1938, all Jewish men of Polish extraction were expelled to the Polish border, their families joining them later and most ultimately perishing in the ghettoes and concentration camps. On Kristallnacht (9–10 November 1938), the Adass Jeshurun synagogue was burned to the ground, the main synagogue was damaged, and Jewish men were taken to the Dachau concentration camp after being beaten and tormented. Deportations commenced on 22 October 1940, when 893 Jews were loaded onto trains for the three-day journey to the Gurs concentration camp in France. Another 387 were deported in from 1942 to 1945 to Izbica in the Lublin district (Poland), Theresienstadt, and Auschwitz. Of the 1,280 Jews deported directly from Karlsruhe, 1,175 perished. Another 138 perished after deportation from other German cities or occupied Europe. In all, 1,421 of Karlsruhe's Jews died during The Holocaust. A new community was formed after the war by surviving former residents, with a new synagogue erected in 1971. It numbered 359 in 1980.

== Notable people ==
=== Public service ===
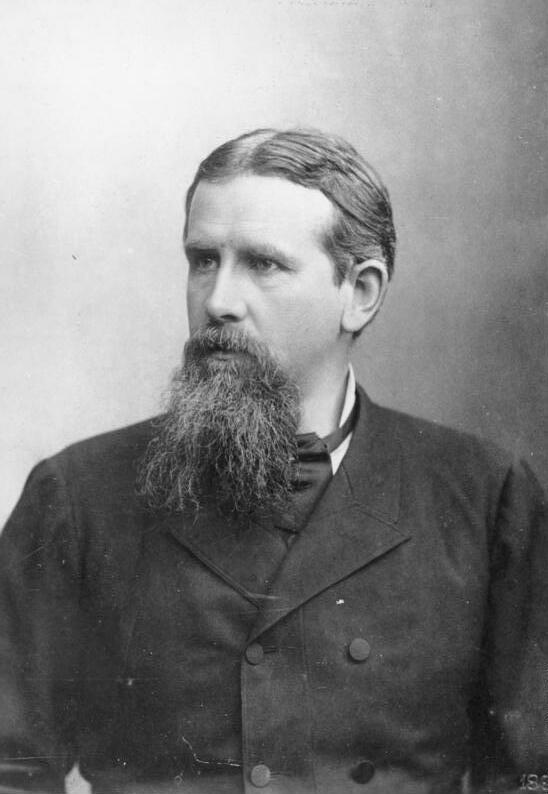
Friedrich Ratzel

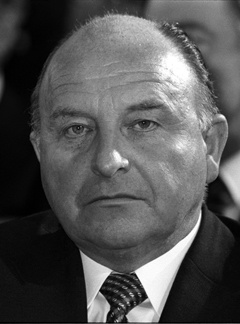
Siegfried Buback, 1976

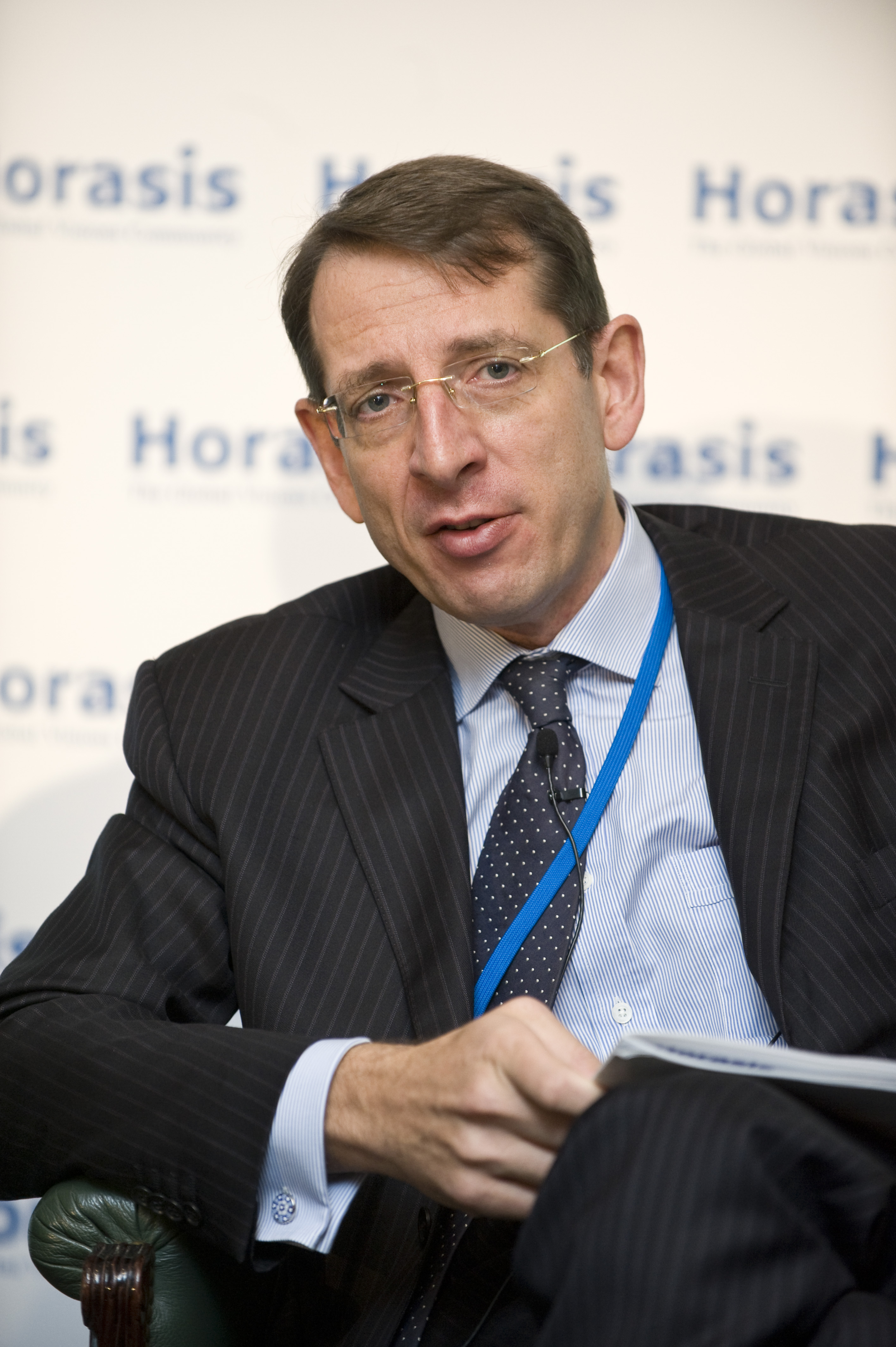
Frank-Jurgen Richter, 2010)

- Jacob Ettlinger (1798–1871), an Ashkenazi rabbi and author and one of the leaders of Orthodox Judaism.
- Anton von Stabel (1806–1880), a Baden lawyer, judge and statesman.
- Heinrich Julius Holtzmann (1832–1910), Protestant theologian.
- Adolf Hausrath (1837–1909), a German theologian.
- Adolf Marschall von Bieberstein (1842–1912), State Secretary of the Foreign Office of the German Empire.
- Karl Benz (1844–1929), mechanical engineer and inventor of the first automobile; founded Benz & Co., Daimler-Benz, (now part of Daimler AG). He was born locally in Mühlburg
- Friedrich Ratzel (1844–1904), geographer and ethnographer, used the term Lebensraum.
- Hedwig Kettler (1851–1937), women's rights activist, writer and education reformer; founded the first German Mädchengymnasium (girls' high school) in Karlsruhe
- Berthold von Deimling (1853–1944), general officer of the German Army during WW1 became a pacifist.
- Franz Lipp (1855–1937), a German lawyer and politician, participant in Palm Sunday Putsch
- Ludwig R. Conradi (1856–1939), leader of European Adventism, caused controversy and schism
- Gustav Landauer (1870–1919), theorist of anarchism in Germany
- Maximilian Bayer (1872–1917), founded Scouting in Germany
- Walter von Reichenau (1884–1942), Generalfeldmarschall in World War II; authored the Severity Order
- Otto Wagener (1888–1971), SA-Stabschef, Nazi economic specialist and a Generalmajor in the Wehrmacht
- brothers Maximilian Fretter-Pico (1892–1984), & Otto Fretter-Pico (1893–1966), WW2 generals
- Erwin Kraus (1894–1966), Korpsführer of the National Socialist Motor Corps
- Reinhold Frank (1896–1945), lawyer who worked for the resistance in Nazi Germany. helped the 20 July plot
- Hans Frank (1900–1946), war criminal, SA-Obergruppenführer, Reichsleiter and governor-general of Nazi-occupied Poland; hanged at Nuremberg for his war crimes during World War II
- Siegfried Buback (1920–1977), then-Attorney General of West Germany, victim of the Rote Armee Fraktion
- Werner Nachmann (1925–1988), entrepreneur and politician
- Harry L. Ettlinger (1926–2018), US Army private who assisted the MFAA in the recovery of art looted by the Nazis. He was the last Jewish boy to celebrate his bar mitzvah in Karlsruhe's Kronenstrasse Synagogue
- Ingo Wellenreuther (born 1959), former judge; politician, (CDU), member of the Bundestag, 2002 to 2021.
- Dirk Jens Nonnenmacher (born 1963), mathematician and bank CEO and chairman
- Joachim Nagel (born 1966), economist, President of the Bundesbank since 2022.
- Frank-Jürgen Richter (born 1967), entrepreneur and former director of the World Economic Forum.
- Ulrich Arnswald (born 1970), German philosopher, economist and political scientist
- Diana Stöcker (born 1970), politician (CDU)

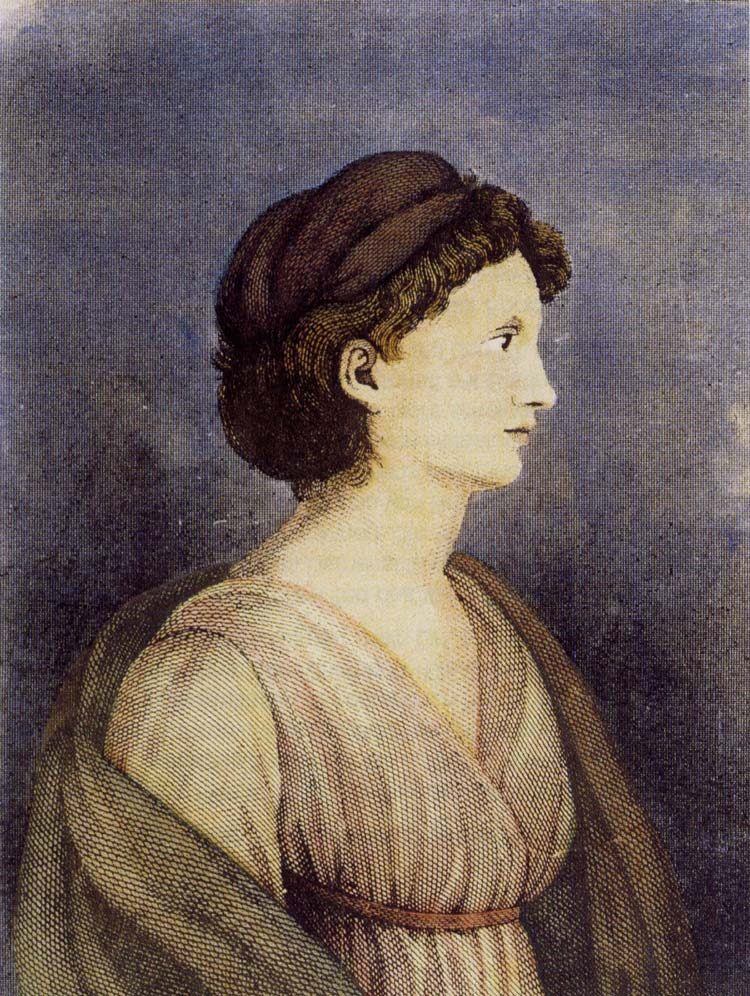
Karoline von Günderrode

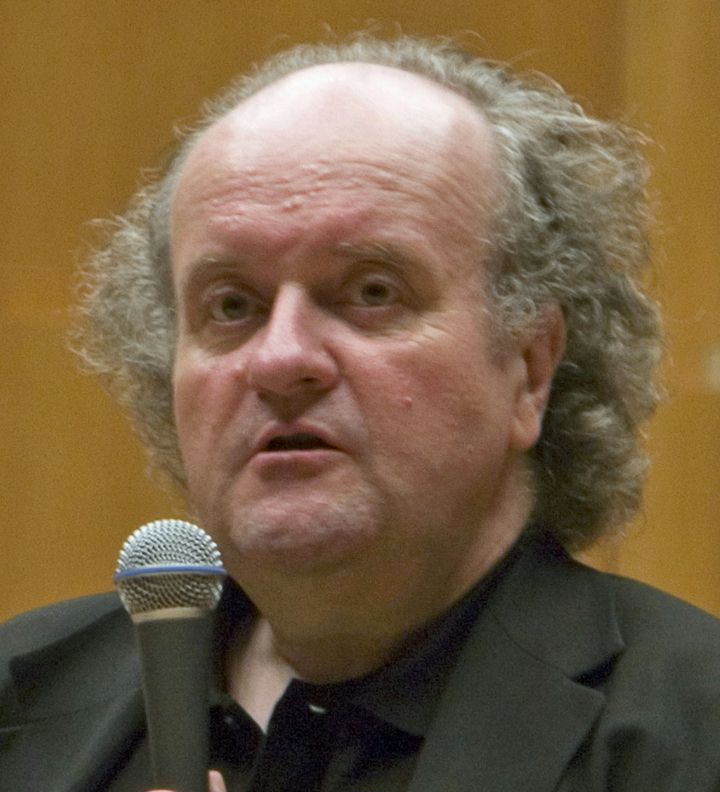
Wolfgang Rihm, 2007

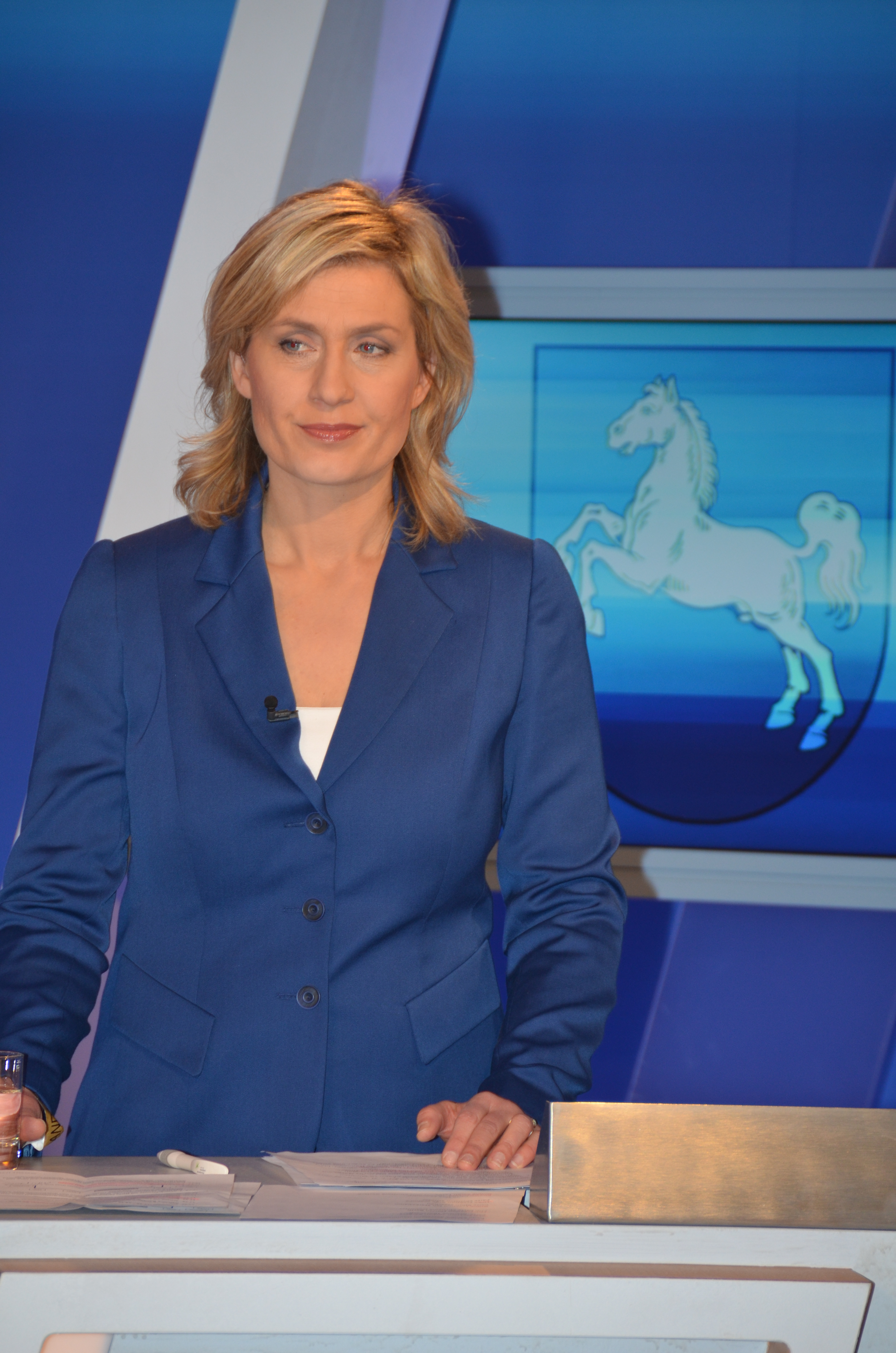
Susanne Stichler, 2013

=== The arts ===
- Johann Peter Hebel (1760–1826), short story writer, dialectal poet and Lutheran theologian; lived locally.
- Antoine Ignace Melling (1763–1831), painter, architect and voyager
- Friedrich Weinbrenner (1766–1826), neoclassicist architect; his tomb is in the main Protestant church.
- Karoline von Günderrode (1780–1806), romantic poet.
- August Böckh (1785–1867), classical scholar and antiquarian.
- Julius Braun (1825–1869), historian, with an interest in art, culture and religion.
- Joseph Viktor von Scheffel (1826–1886), poet and novelist.
- Ludwig Eichrodt (1827–1892), poet and dramatist.
- Ferdinand Keller (1842–1922), genre and history painter.
- Teobert Maler (1842–1917), an explorer who documented the ruins of the Maya civilization.
- Hermann Billing (1867–1946), Art Nouveau architect, born and lived in Karlsruhe, where his works now are.
- Karl Hofer (1878–1955) an expressionist painter & director of the Berlin Academy of Fine Arts.
- Otto Bartning (1883–1959), architect and architectural theorist; planned the Bauhaus with Walter Gropius
- Margarete Schweikert (1887–1957), composer, music critic, violinist and pianist
- Karl Hubbuch (1891–1979), German painter, printmaker and draftsman
- Hermann Goetz (1898–1976), art historian (partic. Indian art history) and museum director
- Marie Luise Kaschnitz (1901–1974). short story writer, novelist, essayist and poet.
- Peter Sloterdijk (born 1947), philosopher and cultural theorist, rejects the existence of dualisms
- Wolfgang Rihm (1952–2024), composer of contemporary classical music
- Kolja Lessing (born 1961), violinist, pianist, composer and academic teacher
- Sebastian Koch (born 1962), television and film actor.
- Andi Deris (born 1964), musician and songwriter, lead singer of the power metal band Helloween
- Susanne Stichler (born 1969), journalist and television presenter
- Laith Al-Deen (born 1972), pop singer.
- Maren Ade (born 1976), film director, screenwriter and producer.
- Nora Krug (born 1977), German-American writer, lives in Brooklyn
- Fatma Aydemir (born 1986), German author and journalist
- Moon Ga-young (born 1996), South Korean actress and model
- Heinrich Kley (born 1863), Influential artist
- Michaela Kölmel (born 1956), artist and professor
- Mara Kölmel (born 1989), art historian

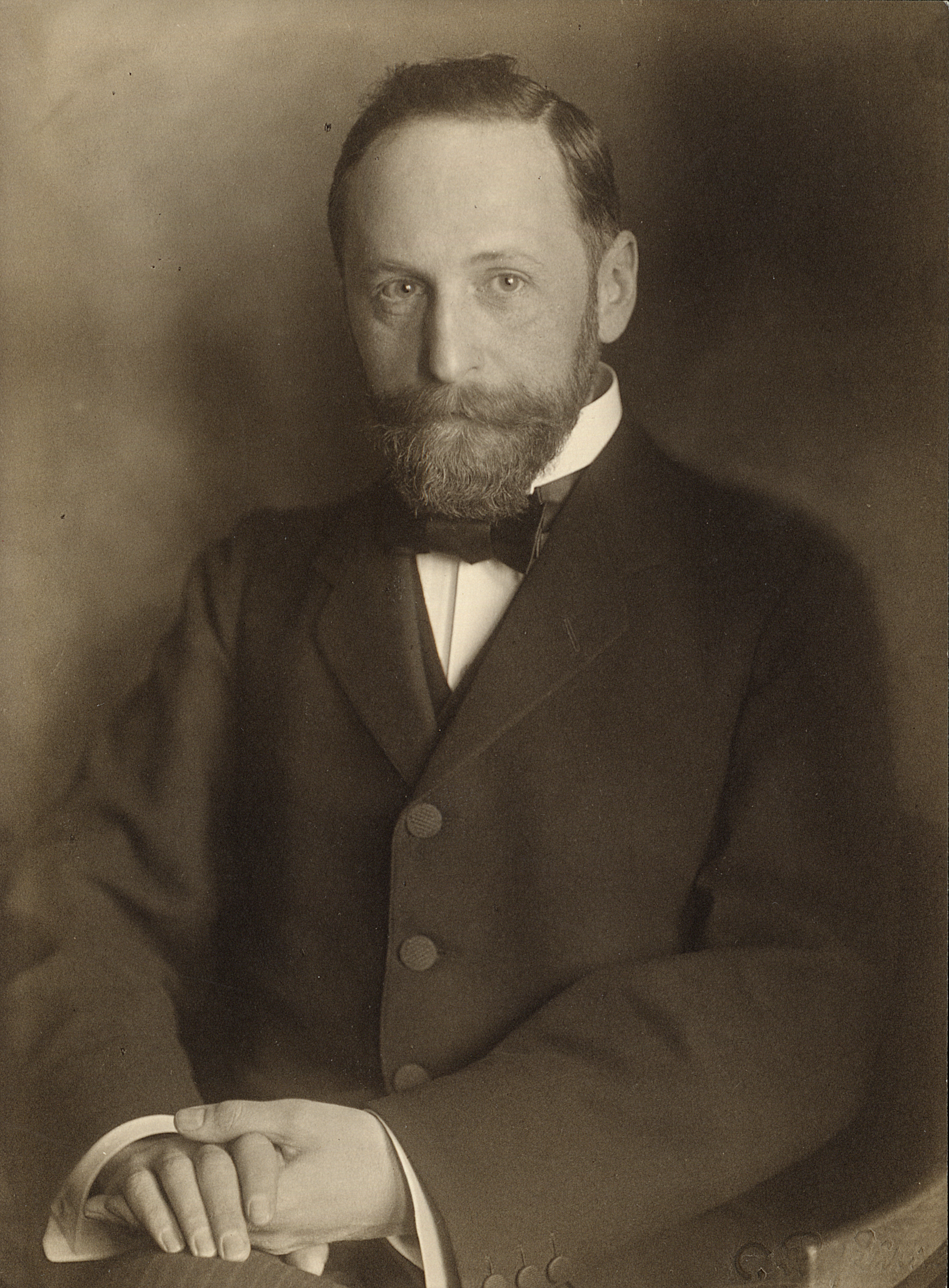
Richard Willstätter

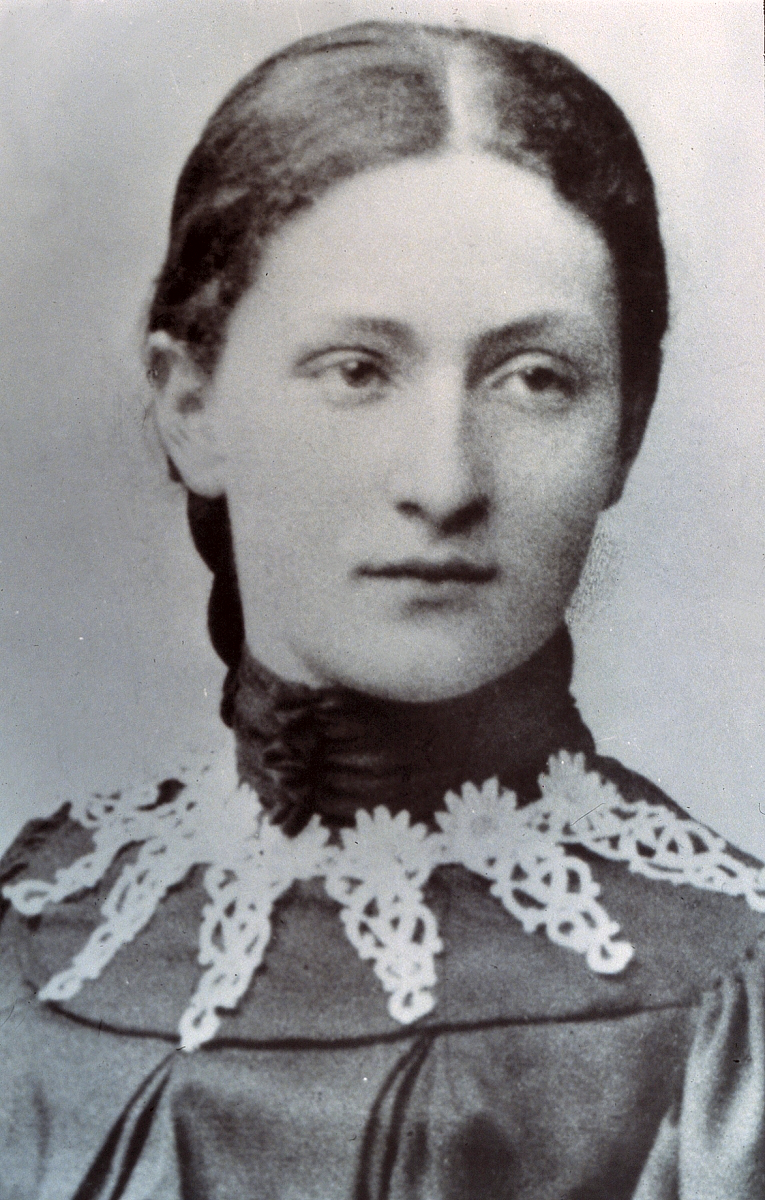
Rahel Straus, 1905

=== Science ===
- Marianne Bielschowsky (1904–1977), biochemist and anti–fascist
- Johann Gottfried Tulla (1770–1828), stabilized and straightened the southern Rhine; a co-founder of the Karlsruhe University (1825)
- Karl Drais (1785–1851), inventor of the two-wheeler principle (dandy horse) basic to bicycles and motorcycles & the key typewriter and earliest stenograph
- Friedrich Parrot (1791–1841), a Baltic German naturalist, explorer, and mountaineer; climbed Mount Ararat
- Robert Gerwig (1820–1885), civil engineer, designer of the Black Forest Railway
- Heinrich Hertz (1857–1894), discovered electromagnetic waves at the University of Karlsruhe in the 1880s.
- Hermann Blau (1871–1944), engineer and chemist and inventor of Blau gas
- Richard Willstätter (1872–1942), organic chemist, recipient of 1915 Nobel Prize for Chemistry
- Eugen Fischer (1874–1967), physician who influenced Nazi racial hygiene
- Rahel Straus (1880–1963), a pioneering German-Jewish medical doctor, feminist and writer.
- Friedrich Hund (1896–1997), physicist of the pioneering generation of quantum mechanics (see Hund's rules)
- S. H. Foulkes (1898–1976), psychiatrist and psychoanalyst, founder of group analysis.
- Erik H. Erikson (1902–1994), children's psychoanalyst and theoretical pioneer of identity building. School locally
- Fritz Görnnert (1907–1984), German aircraft engineer and civil servant in the Reich Aviation Ministry
- Klaus-Robert Müller (born 1964), computer scientist and physicist, a pioneer of machine learning

=== Sport ===
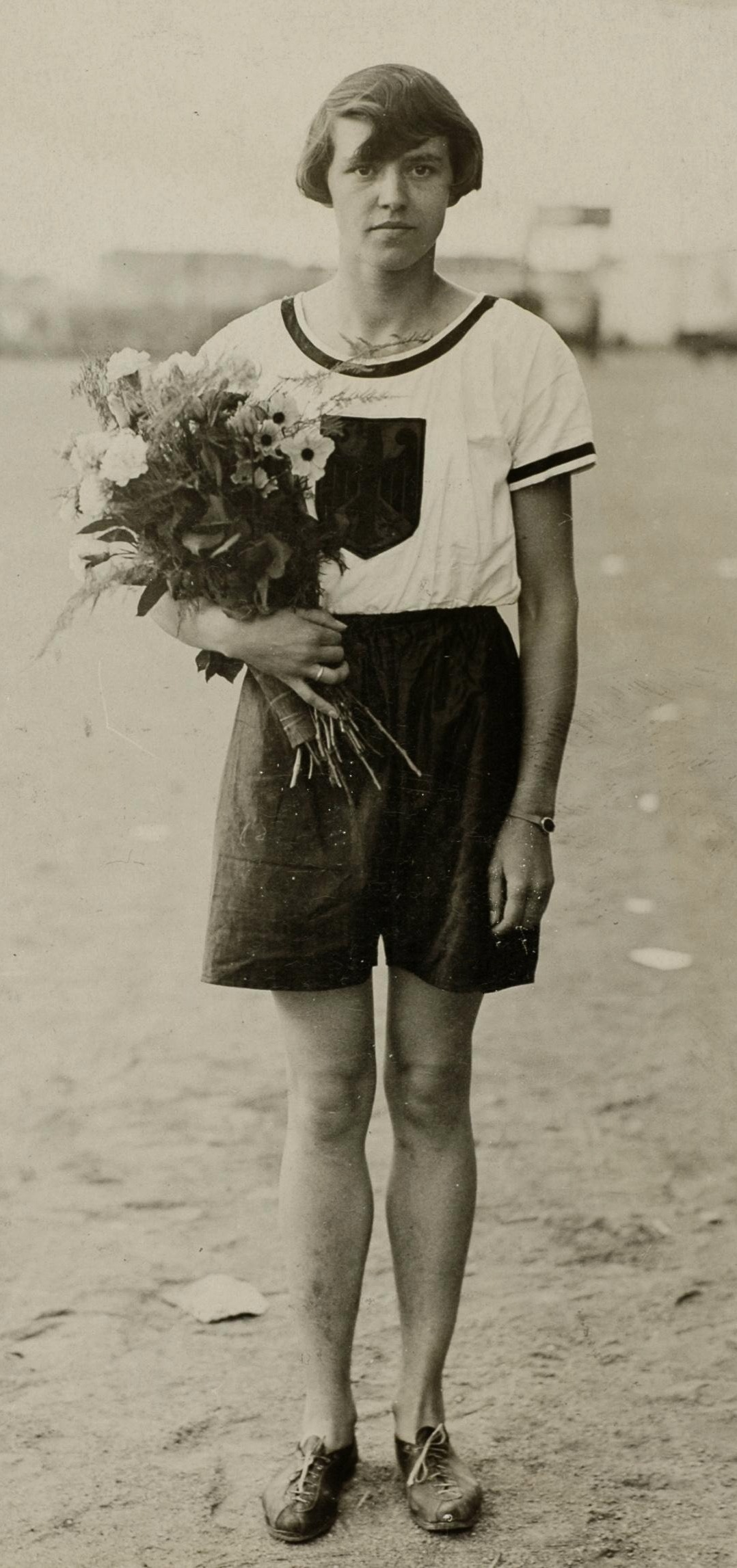
Lina Radke, 1928

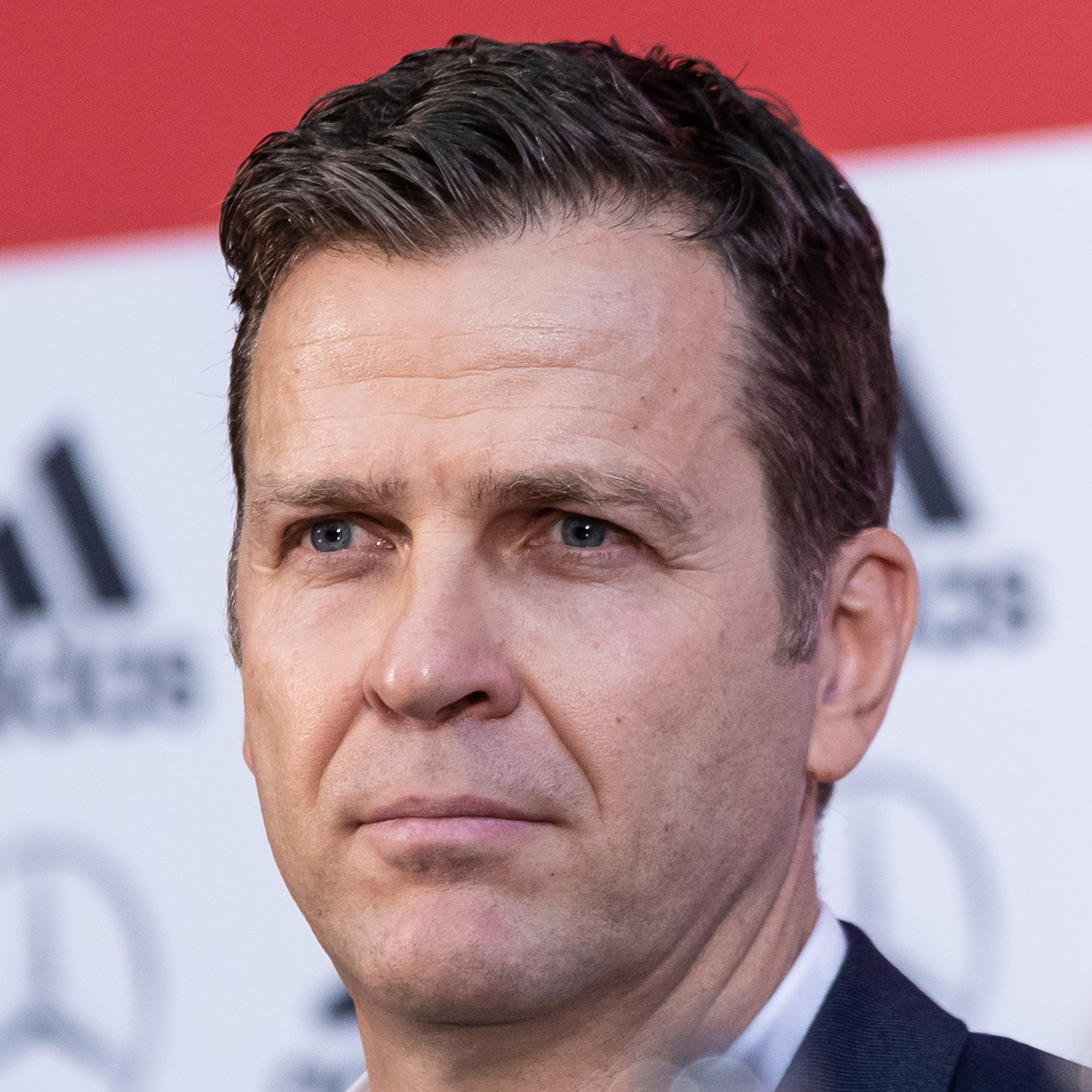
Oliver Bierhoff, 2018

- Ludwig Durlacher (1844–1924), a Grand Duchy of Baden-born American strongman and gym owner.
- Walther Bensemann (1873–1934), one of the founders of the first southern German soccer club Karlsruher FV and later one of the founders of DFB, lived locally
- Gottfried Fuchs (1889–1972), was born in Karlsruhe and holds the record of ten goals in one single international soccer match at the 1912 Olympics for the German national team
- Julius Hirsch (1892–1945), Olympian footballer, first Jewish member of the national team, two-time Germany team champion, awarded the Iron Cross during World War I, murdered in Auschwitz concentration camp
- Lina Radke (1903–1983), track and field athlete gold medallist, women's 800m at the 1928 Summer Olympics.
- Gerhard Hennige (born 1940). a retired sprinter, silver medallist at the 1968 Summer Olympics
- Detlef Hofmann (born 1963), sprint canoeist, gold medallist at the 1996 Summer Olympics.
- Oliver Bierhoff (born 1968), retired footballer and captain of Germany; played 444 games and 70 for Germany
- Oliver Kahn (born 1969), goalkeeper of Karlsruher SC & Bayern Munich, played 630 games and 86 for Germany
- Mehmet Scholl (born 1970), footballer for Karlsruher SC & Bayern Munich, played 420 games and 36 for Germany
- Jens Nowotny (born 1974), footballer, played 344 games and 48 for Germany
- Renate Lingor (born 1975), former footballer for the Germany women's national football team, played 149 games
- Regina Halmich (born 1976), retired female boxing flyweight world champion
- Vincenzo Italiano (born 1977), Italian football manager currently managing Fiorentina, played 410 games
- Dennis Aogo (born 1987), football defender, played 340 games and 12 for Germany
- Danny Williams (born 1989), footballer played 290 games and 23 for United States
- Sead Kolašinac (born 1993), Bosnian footballer, played 60 games for Bosnia
- Marco Pašalić (born 2000), footballer
- Alexi Pitu (born 2002), Romanian football player

=== Aristocracy ===
- Charles III William, Margrave of Baden-Durlach (1679–1738), Margrave of Baden-Durlach, 1709 to 1738.
- Frederica of Baden (1781–1826) Queen of Sweden from 1797 to 1809 as the consort of King Gustav IV Adolf.
- Princess Alexandrine of Baden (1820–1904), Duchess of Saxe-Coburg and Gotha 1844 to 1893
- Frederick II, Grand Duke of Baden (1857–1928) the last sovereign Grand Duke of Baden, 1907 to abolition 1918.
- Victoria of Baden (1862–1930), queen consort of Sweden by her marriage to King Gustaf V
- Berthold, Margrave of Baden (1906–1963), head of the House of Baden, until 1918 & 1929 until his death

== Education ==
- Bismarck-Gymnasium Karlsruhe

Karlsruhe is a renowned research and study centre, with one of Germany's finest institutions of higher education.

=== Technology, engineering, and business ===
The Karlsruhe Institute of Technology (KIT) (conglomeration of the University of Karlsruhe (TH) and the Karlsruhe Research Center since 2009) is the oldest technical university in Germany, one of nine German Universities of Excellence, and the primary research university of the Helmholtz Association. According to the QS World Ranking, it is fifth among the best universities in Germany and 98th worldwide. The Karlsruhe University of Applied Sciences (Hochschule Karlsruhe – HKA) is the third-largest university of applied sciences in the state of Baden-Württemberg and offers both professional and academic education in engineering sciences and business.

=== The arts ===
The Academy of Fine Arts, Karlsruhe is one of the smallest universities in Germany, with average 300 students. The Karlsruhe University of Arts and Design (HfG) was founded to the same time as its sister institution, the Center for Art and Media Karlsruhe (Zentrum für Kunst und Medientechnologie). The HfG teaching and research focuses on new media and media art. The Hochschule für Musik Karlsruhe is a music conservatory that offers degrees in composition, music performance, education, and radio journalism. Since 1989 it has been located in the Gottesaue Palace.

=== International education ===
The Karlshochschule International University (formerly known as Merkur Internationale Fachhochschule) was founded in 2004. As a foundation-owned, state-approved management school, Karlshochschule offers undergraduate education in both German and English, focusing on international and intercultural management, as well as service- and culture-related industries. Furthermore, an international consecutive Master of Arts in leadership studies is offered in English.

=== European Institute of Innovation and Technology (EIT) ===
Karlsruhe hosts one of the European Institute of Innovation and Technology's Knowledge and Innovation Communities (KICs) focusing on sustainable energy. Other co‑centres are based in Grenoble, France (CC Alps Valleys); Eindhoven, the Netherlands, and Leuven, Belgium (CC Benelux); Barcelona, Spain (CC Iberia); Kraków, Poland (CC PolandPlus); and Stockholm, Sweden (CC Sweden).

=== University of education ===
The Karlsruhe University of Education was founded in 1962. It is specialized in educational processes. The university has about 3700 students and 180 full-time researchers and lecturers. It offers a wide range of educational studies, like teaching profession for primary and secondary schools (both optional with a European Teaching Certificate profile), Bachelor programs that specializes in Early Childhood Education and in Health and Leisure Education, Master programs in Educational Science, Intercultural Education, Migration and Multilingualism. Furthermore, the University of Education Karlsruhe offers a Master program for Biodiversity and Environmental Education.

== Culture ==
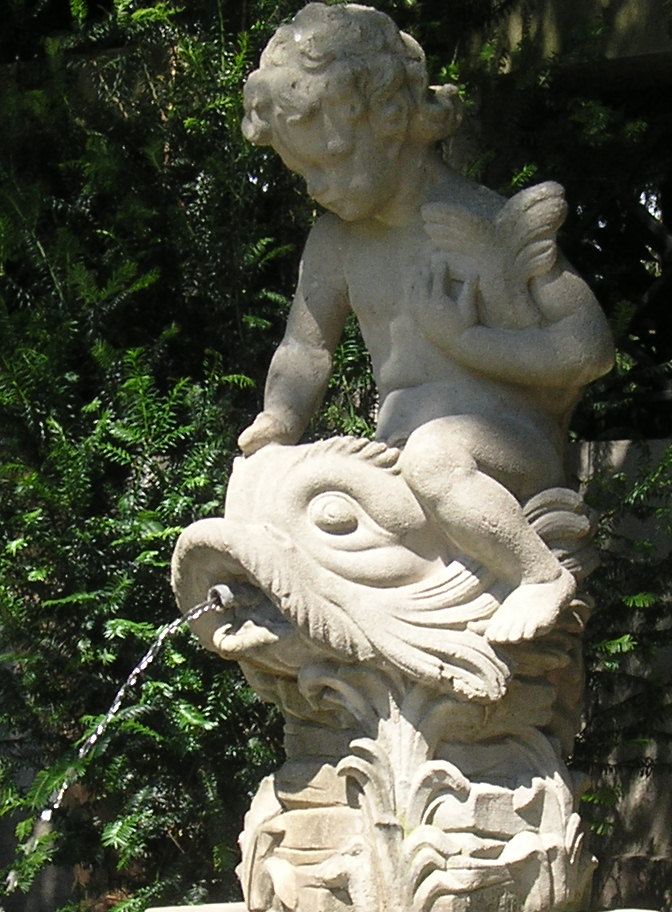
Nancy fountain

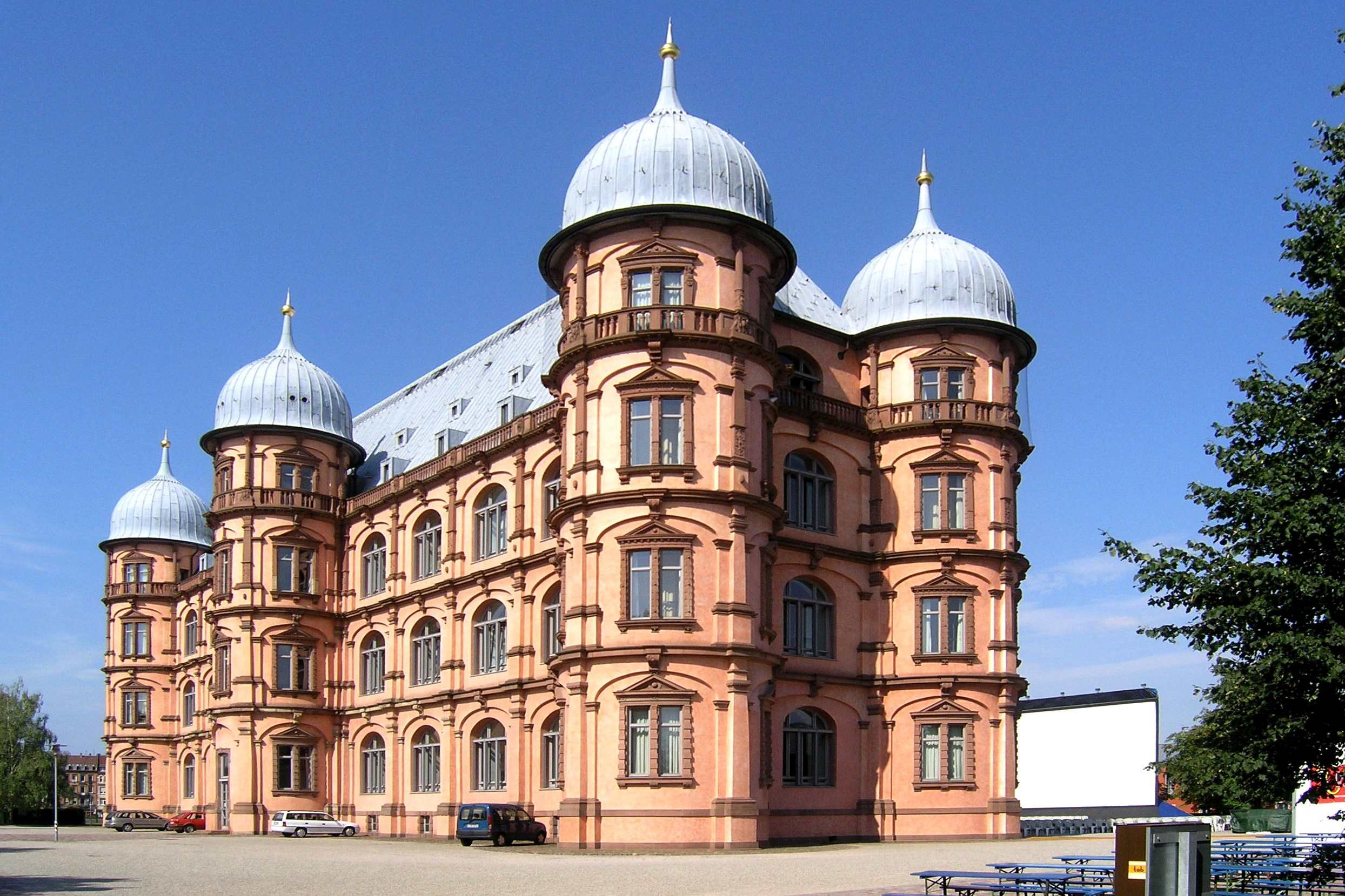
Gottesau Palace (now music college)

In 1999 the ZKM (Zentrum für Kunst und Medientechnologie, Centre for Art and Media) was opened. Linking new media theory and practice, the ZKM is located in a former weapons factory. Among the institutes related to the ZKM are the Staatliche Hochschule für Gestaltung (State University of Design), whose president is philosopher Peter Sloterdijk and the Museum for Contemporary Art.

== Twin towns – sister cities ==
Karlsruhe is twinned with:

- Nancy, France (1955)
- Nottingham, England, United Kingdom (1969)
- Halle, Germany (1987)
- Krasnodar, Russia (1997)
- Timișoara, Romania (1997)
- Vinnytsia, Ukraine (2022)

=== Partnerships ===
Karlsruhe also cooperates with:

- Oulu, Finland

== Legacy ==
- The Ukrainian village Stepove near the city of Mykolaiv in southern Ukraine was established by German colonists as Karlsruhe.
- The element Protactinium was discovered here in 1913.

== Events ==
Every year in July there is a large open-air festival lasting three days called simply Das Fest ("The Festival").

The Baden State Theatre has sponsored the Händel Festival since 1978.

The city hosted the 23rd and 31st European Juggling Conventions (EJC) in 2000 and 2008.

In July the African Summer Festival is held in the city's Nordstadt. Markets, drumming workshops, exhibitions, a varied children's programme, and musical performances take place during the three days festival.

In the past Karlsruhe has been the host of LinuxTag (the biggest Linux event in Europe) and until 2006 hosted the annual Linux Audio Conference.

Visitors and locals watched the total solar eclipse at noon on 11 August 1999. The city was not only located within the eclipse path but was one of the few within Germany not plagued by bad weather.

== Sports ==
Karlsruher SC is the most popular sports club from Karlsruhe. In the 2025–26 season, Karlsruher SC recorded an average attendance of 30,312 across 17 home matches, the eighth-highest average in the 2. Bundesliga.

Football
Karlsruher SC (KSC), DFB (2. Liga)

Basketball
PS Karlsruhe Lions, 2024 champion of the ProA (second division)

Karlsruhe co-hosted the FIBA EuroBasket 1985.

Volleyball
SVK Beiertheim, second German division

Tennis
TC Rueppurr (TCR), [Tennis-Bundesliga] (women's first division)

Lacrosse
KIT SC Karlsruhe Storm, 1. Bundesliga Süd

Baseball, softball
Karlsruhe Cougars, Regional League South-East (men's baseball), 1st Bundesliga South (women's softball I) and State League South (women's softball II)

American football
Badener Greifs, currently competing in the Regional League Central but formerly a member of the German Football League's 1st Bundesliga, lost to the Berlin Adler in the 1987 German Bowl (see also: German Football League)
