= Boroughs of Karlsruhe =

Boroughs of Karlsruhe map

Karlsruhe is divided into 27 districts.

== System ==
The city districts are further subdivided into city neighbourhoods (previously sometimes also referred to as city districts).

According to § 15 and 16 of the main statute of the city of Karlsruhe a local council was set up in each of the districts Durlach (with Aue) and Stupferich, Hohenwettersbach, Wolfartsweier, Grötzingen, Neureut and Wettersbach (Grünwettersbach and Palmbach).

== List ==
| Nr. | Boroughs Neighbourhoods | Area (ha): 31. Dez. 2008 | Population: 31. Dez. 2008 | Population per Squarkilometer |
|---|---|---|---|---|
| 01 | Innenstadt-Ost | 160,12 | 5.890 | 3.679 |
| 011 | Nordöstlicher Teil | 128,83 | 1.252 | 972 |
| 012 | Südwestlicher Teil | 31,28 | 4.638 | 14.827 |
| 02 | Innenstadt-West | 240,32 | 8.769 | 3.649 |
| 021 | Östlicher Teil | 80,33 | 1.814 | 2.258 |
| 022 | Westlicher Teil | 159,99 | 6.955 | 4.347 |
| 03 | Südstadt | 220,49 | 15.370 | 6.971 |
| 031 | Nördlicher Teil | 38,08 | 6.214 | 16.318 |
| 032 | Südlicher Teil | 144,09 | 7.545 | 5.236 |
| 033 | Östlicher Teil | 38,32 | 1.611 | 4.204 |
| 04 | Südweststadt | 296,65 | 18.818 | 6.343 |
| 041 | Östlicher Teil | 104,94 | 5.604 | 5.340 |
| 042 | Mittlerer Teil | 68,99 | 11.943 | 17.311 |
| 043 | Beiertheimer Feld | 122,72 | 1.271 | 1.036 |
| 05 | Weststadt | 172,51 | 19.087 | 11.064 |
| 051 | Mittlerer Teil | 66,18 | 2.890 | 4.367 |
| 052 | Südlicher Teil | 106,33 | 16.197 | 15.233 |
| 06 | Nordweststadt | 375,90 | 10.835 | 2.882 |
| 061 | Alter Flugplatz | 113,11 | 4.842 | 4.281 |
| 062 | Binsenschlauch | 113,95 | 2.491 | 2.186 |
| 063 | Lange Richtstatt | 55,48 | 1.012 | 1.824 |
| 064 | Rennbuckel | 93,36 | 2.490 | 2.667 |
| 07 | Oststadt | 518,59 | 17.546 | 3.383 |
| 071 | Nördlicher Teil | 137,48 | 4.777 | 3.475 |
| 072 | Südlicher Teil | 193,84 | 6.960 | 3.591 |
| 073 | Westlicher Teil | 187,27 | 5.809 | 3.102 |
| 08 | Mühlburg | 526,41 | 15.522 | 2.949 |
| 081 | Alt-Mühlburg | 79,89 | 10.802 | 13.520 |
| 082 | Weingärtensiedlung | 68,09 | 1.283 | 1.884 |
| 083 | Rheinhafen | 347,60 | 1.060 | 305 |
| 084 | Mühlburger Feld | 30,83 | 2.377 | 7.709 |
| 09 | Daxlanden | 1.092,08 | 11.759 | 1.077 |
| 091 | Alt-Daxlanden | 921,35 | 2.343 | 254 |
| 092 | Neu-Daxlanden | 58,01 | 2.557 | 4.408 |
| 093 | Daxlanden-Ost | 37,31 | 2.264 | 6.068 |
| 094 | Rheinstrandsiedlung | 75,42 | 4.595 | 609 |
| 10 | Knielingen | 2.064,28 | 8.819 | 427 |
| 101 | Alt-Knielingen | 631,30 | 2.993 | 463 |
| 102 | Neu-Knielingen | 1.432,98 | 10.209 | 2.315 |
| 11 | Grünwinkel | 440,91 | 8.819 | 2.315 |
| 111 | Alt-Grünwinkel | 113,72 | 3.818 | 3.357 |
| 112 | Hardecksiedlung | 47,16 | 796 | 1.688 |
| 113 | Albsiedlung | 67,14 | 1.191 | 1.744 |
| 114 | Alte Heidenstücker | 140,41 | 2.072 | 1.476 |
| 115 | Neue Heidenstücker | 72,47 | 2.332 | 3.218 |
| 12 | Oberreut | 242,21 | 9.963 | 4.113 |
| 121 | Feldlage | 180,96 | 6.570 | 3.633 |
| 122 | Waldlage | 61,35 | 3.393 | 5.531 |
| 30 | Beiertheim-Bulach | 285,52 | 6.550 | 2.294 |
| 131 | Beiertheim | 51,33 | 3.883 | 7.564 |
| 132 | Bulach | 234,19 | 2.667 | 1.139 |
| 40 | Weiherfeld-Dammerstock | 304,19 | 6.036 | 1.984 |
| 141 | Weiherfeld | 116,11 | 2.807 | 2.417 |
| 142 | Dammerstock | 188,07 | 3.229 | 1.717 |
| 50 | Rüppurr | 702,68 | 10.212 | 1.453 |
| 151 | Alt-Rüppurr | 334,33 | 3.236 | 968 |
| 152 | Neu-Rüppurr | 37,79 | 1.528 | 4.043 |
| 153 | Gartenstadt | 103,14 | 3.051 | 2.958 |
| 154 | Rüppurr-Südost | 227,41 | 2.397 | 1.054 |
| 60 | Waldstadt | 1.035,38 | 12.215 | 1.180 |
| 161 | Waldlage | 946,03 | 8.971 | 948 |
| 162 | Feldlage | 89,35 | 3.244 | 3.631 |
| 70 | Rintheim | 332,90 | 5.587 | 1.678 |
| 171 | Alt-Rintheim | 311,03 | 3.246 | 1.044 |
| 172 | Rintheimer Feld | 21,88 | 2.341 | 10.701 |
| 80 | Hagsfeld | 717,62 | 7.071 | 985 |
| 181 | Alt-Hagsfeld | 578,49 | 2.680 | 463 |
| 182 | Westlicher Teil | 139,13 | 4.391 | 3.156 |
| 90 | Durlach | 2.294,12 | 29.433 | 1.283 |
| 191 | Alt-Durlach | 561,74 | 10.977 | 1.954 |
| 192 | Dornwald-Untermühl | 69,02 | 1.270 | 1.840 |
| 193 | Hanggebiet | 829,41 | 5.305 | 640 |
| 194 | Bergwald | 71,60 | 1.247 | 1.742 |
| 195 | Aue | 212,78 | 7.371 | 3.464 |
| 196 | Lohn-Lissen | 32,30 | 2.807 | 8.690 |
| 197 | Killisfeld | 517,27 | 456 | 88 |
| 20 | Grötzingen | 1.133,58 | 9.252 | 816 |
| 201 | Nördlich der Pfinz | 966,89 | 6.314 | 633 |
| 202 | Südlich der Pfinz | 136,69 | 2.938 | 2.149 |
| 21 | Stupferich | 649,99 | 2.732 | 420 |
| 22 | Hohenwettersbach | 413,14 | 2.865 | 693 |
| 23 | Wolfartsweier | 200,58 | 3.227 | 1.609 |
| 24 | Grünwettersbach | 603,49 | 3.990 | 661 |
| 25 | Palmbach | 137,50 | 1.690 | 1.229 |
| 26 | Neureut | 1.917,76 | 16.467 | 859 |
| 261 | Südlicher Teil | 234,66 | 3.683 | 1.570 |
| 262 | Nördlicher Teil | 625,00 | 7.397 | 1.184 |
| 263 | Kirchfeld | 949,77 | 3.063 | 322 |
| 264 | Heide | 108,34 | 2.324 | 2.145 |
| 27 | Nordstadt | 267,31 | 9.398 | 3.516 |
| 271 | Hardtwaldsiedlung | 65,17 | 3.080 | 4.726 |
| 272 | Amerikanersiedlung | 202,14 | 6.318 | 3.126 |
| 01-07, 27 | Innere Stadtteile | 1.984,58 | 96.315 | 4.853 |
| 08-26 | Äußere Stadtteile | 15.361,66 | 182.997 | 1.191 |
| 01-27 | Karlsruhe | 17.346,24 | 279.312 | 1.610 |
