= Karlsruhe II (electoral district) =

State electoral district of Germany

28: Karlsruhe II
- Electoral district for the Landtag of Baden-Württemberg
- Karlsruhe II in 2026
- District: Karlsruhe
- Electorate: 101,592 (2026)
- Major settlements: Daxlanden, Grünwinkel, Innenstadt-West, Knielingen, Mühlburg, Neureut, Nordstadt, Nordweststadt, Oberreut, Südweststadt, and Weststadt

Current electoral district
- Party: Green
- Member: Benjamin Bauer

Karlsruhe II is an electoral constituency (German: Wahlkreis) represented in the Landtag of Baden-Württemberg.

Since 2026, it has elected one member via first-past-the-post voting. Voters cast a second vote under which additional seats are allocated proportionally state-wide. Under the constituency numbering system, it is designated as constituency 28.

It is wholly within the city of Karlsruhe.

== Geography ==
The constituency includes the districts of Daxlanden, Grünwinkel, Innenstadt-West, Knielingen, Mühlburg, Neureut, Nordstadt, Nordweststadt, Oberreut, Südweststadt, and Weststadt within the city of Karlsruhe.

There were 101,592 eligible voters in 2026.

== Members ==
=== First mandate ===
Both prior to and since the electoral reforms for the 2026 election, the winner of the plurality of the vote (first-past-the-post) in every constituency won the first mandate.

Election	Member	Party	%
1976	Toni Menzinger	CDU	
1980	Gerhard Seiler	CDU	
1984	Wolfram Meyer	CDU	
1988	Wolfram Meyer	CDU	
1992	Wolfram Meyer	CDU	
1996	Hans-Michael Bender	CDU	
2001	Regina Schmidt-Kühner	SPD	38.4
2006	Katrin Schütz	CDU	38.2
2011	Katrin Schütz	CDU	30.6
2016	Alexander Salomon	Grüne	35.1
2021	Alexander Salomon	Grüne	38.6
2026	Benjamin Bauer	Grüne	39.3

=== Second mandate ===
Prior to the electoral reforms for the 2026 election, the seats in the state parliament were allocated proportionately amongst parties which received more than 5% of valid votes across the state. The seats that were won proportionally for parties that did not win as many first mandates as seats they were entitled to, were allocated to their candidates which received the highest proportion of the vote in their respective constituencies. This meant that following some elections, a constituency would have one or more members elected under a second mandate.

Prior to 2011, these second mandates were allocated to the party candidates who got the greatest number of votes, whilst from 2011-2021, these were allocated according to percentage share of the vote.

Election	Member	Party
1976	Erwin Sack	SPD
1980	Erwin Sack	SPD
1984	Birgitte Wimmer	SPD
1988	Birgitte Wimmer	SPD
1992	Birgitte Wimmer	SPD
1996	Gerhard Stolz	Grüne
2001		
2006	Renate Rastätter	Grüne
2011	Alexander Salomon	Grüne
2016		
2021

== Election results ==
=== 2026 election ===
State election (2026): Karlsruhe II
Notes:	Blue background denotes the winner of the electorate vote. Pink background denotes a candidate elected from their party list. Yellow background denotes an electorate win by a list member, or other incumbent. A ✓ or ✗ denotes status of any incumbent, win or lose respectively.						
Party	Candidate	Votes	%	±%	Party votes	%	±%
Greens	Benjamin Bauer	26,917	39.3	▲0.6	28,683	41.7	▲3.0
CDU	Katrin Schütz	15,652	22.8	▲4.5	13,088	19.0	▲0.6
AfD	Rouven Stolz	9,509	13.9	▲6.4	9,161	13.3	▲5.8
Left	Louise Fessmann	6,866	10.0	▲3.3	6,192	9.0	▲2.3
SPD	Adrian Keller	5,398	7.9	▼4.2	4,016	5.8	▼6.2
FDP	Sean-Anthony Braun von Stumm	2,708	4.0	▼3.3	2,698	3.9	▼3.4
Volt	Neo Langner	1,479	2.2	▲0.3	1,332	1.9	▲0.1
BSW					990	1.4	
APT					703	1.0	
FW					672	1.0	▼0.5
PARTEI					422	0.6	▼1.5
Team Todenhöfer					149	0.2	
dieBasis					129	0.2	▼1.0
Pensioners					110	0.2	
Bündnis C					105	0.2	
ÖDP					96	0.1	▼0.4
Values					75	0.1	
KlimalisteBW					67	0.1	▼1.6
PdF					65	0.1	
Verjüngungsforschung					53	0.1	
Humanists					51	0.1	▼0.5
Informal votes		642			314		
Total valid votes		68,529			68,857		
Turnout		69,171	68.1	▲9.1			
Greens hold	Majority	11,265	16.5	▼3.7			

=== 2021 election ===
State election (2026): Karlsruhe II
Party	Candidate	Votes	%	±%
Greens	Alexander Salomon	23,097	38.6	▲3.5
CDU	Katrin Schütz	10,989	18.4	▼2.6
SPD	Meri Uhlig	7,196	12.0	▼1.4
AfD	Rouven Stolz	4,483	7.5	▼6.4
FDP	Patrik Mahlke	4,363	7.3	▲0.6
Left	Anna-Maria Jahn	4,020	6.7	▲1.8
PARTEI	Joshua Stock	1,247	2.1	▲1.2
Volt	Michael Vogtmann	1,084	1.8	
KlimalisteBW	Markus Schmoll	1,011	1.7	
FW	Rena Thormann	908	1.5	
dieBasis	Dominik Langer	687	1.1	
Humanists	Andreas Schäfer	365	0.6	
ÖDP	Eike Zimpelmann	321	0.5	▲0.1
Majority		12,108	20.2	
Rejected ballots		265	0.4	▼0.4
Turnout		60,036	58.9	▼8.6
Registered electors		101,847		
Greens hold		Swing		

== See also ==
- Politics of Baden-Württemberg
- Landtag of Baden-Württemberg
