= Oberwald (disambiguation) =

Oberwald may refer to:

- Oberwald (Karlsruhe), a forest in Karlsruhe, Germany
- Oberwald, a village in Valais, Switzerland
- Oberwald railway station, a station in Valais, Switzerland
- Oberwälder Land, a natural region in Hesse, Germany
- Oberwaldberg, a mountain in Hesse, Germany
