= Innenstadt Karlsruhe =

Innenstadt Karlsruhe may refer to one of two districts in the Karlsruhe city center:

- Innenstadt-West (Karlsruhe), the western district
- Innenstadt-Ost (Karlsruhe), the eastern district
