= Karlsbad (Baden) =

- Municipality
- Coat of arms

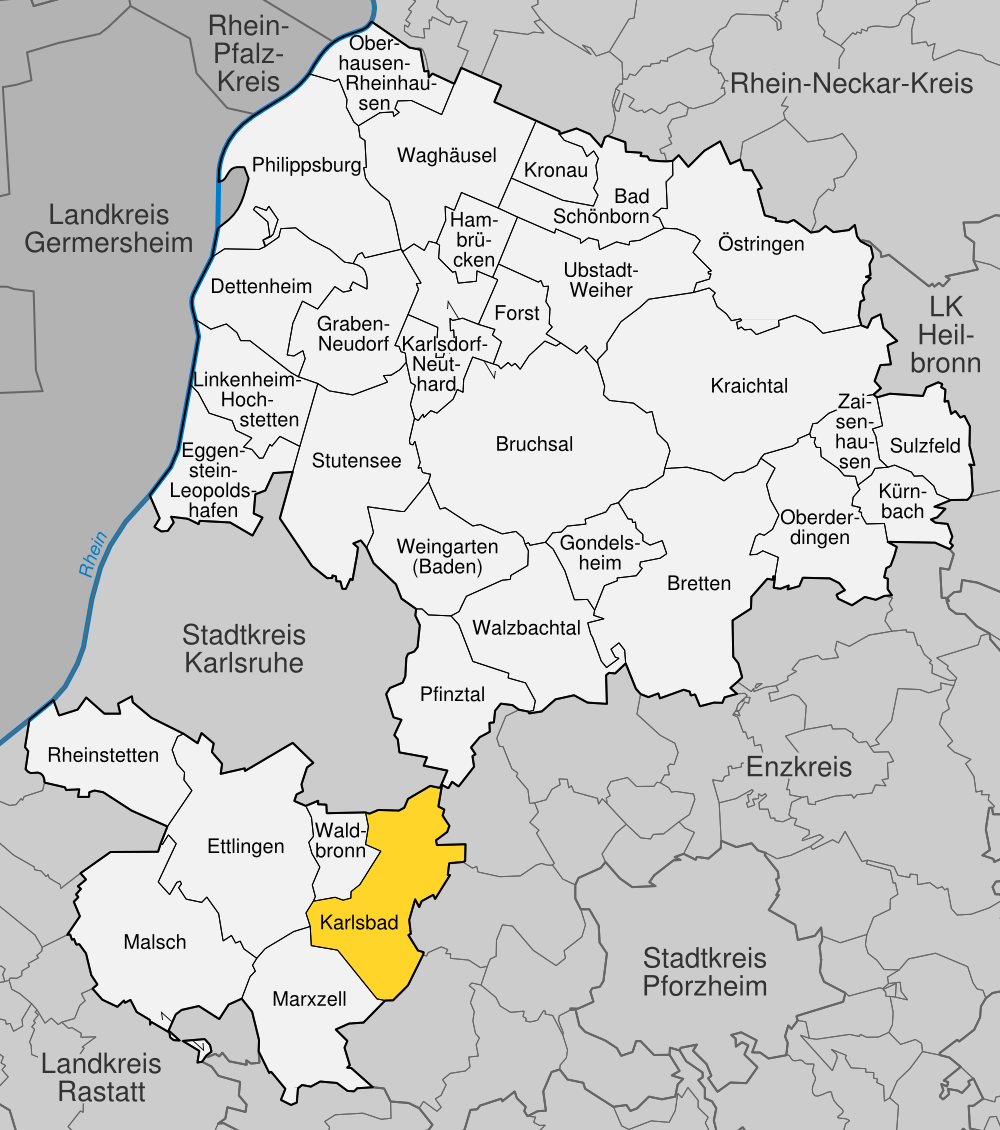
- Location of Karlsbad within Karlsruhe district
- Interactive map of Karlsbad
- Location within Germany Location within Baden-Württemberg
- Coordinates: 48°54′52″N 08°30′23″E
- Country: Germany
- State: Baden-Württemberg
- Admin. region: Karlsruhe
- District: Karlsruhe

Government
  - Mayor (2023–31): Björn Kornmüller (FDP)

Area
  - Total: 38.01 km^{2} (14.68 sq mi)
- Elevation: 264 m (866 ft)

Population (2025-12-31)
  - Total: 16,137
  - Density: 424.5/km^{2} (1,100/sq mi)
- Time zone: UTC+01:00 (CET)
  - Summer (DST): UTC+02:00 (CEST)
- Postal codes: 76307
- Dialling codes: 07202, 07248
- Vehicle registration: KA
- Website: www.karlsbad.de

Karlsbad (German: [ˈkaʁlsˌbaːt]; South Franconian: Kallsbad) is a municipality in the district of Karlsruhe, in Baden-Württemberg, Germany.

== Demographics ==
Population development:

Year	Inhabitants
1990	14,721
2001	16,299
2011	15,634
2021	15,944

== Geography and history ==
The municipality is situated on the Alb-Pfinz Plateau in the northern Black Forest, 8 km east-southeast of Ettlingen, 13 km southeast of Karlsruhe, and 15 km west of Pforzheim.

=== Constituent villages ===
The municipality of Karlsbad consists of 5 previously independent single-village municipalities united by the municipality reform in 1971:

==== Langensteinbach ====
The largest and central village in Karlsbad, where the main administration offices are situated. Whereas each village has its own primary school, all of Karlsbad's secondary schools (Gymnasium, Realschule and Hauptschule) are located in Langensteinbach. Langensteinbach also counts with a famous hospital, a special school for disabled people and even public swimming pools.

==== Auerbach ====
Although excavations proved that the area where Auerbach is located was already settled by 90 A.D., the village was first mentioned in documents in 1278. Auerbach is one of the minor villages of Karlsbad. As any of Karlsbad's districts, it has its own civic center with local administration offices dealing with topics regarding the village rather than the whole municipality. Furthermore it features a Kindergarten, a primary school, a big sports' and events' hall (a so-called "multi-purpose hall") and soccer fields for the local football club.

==== Mutschelbach ====
Together with Auerbach, Mutschelbach is one of the smallest villages in Karlsbad. Its first documentary evidence can be dated back to 1278. In 1936 the previously independent, but almost merging, Waldensian villages Upper, Lower and Central Mutschelbach were united to a single municipality called Mutschelbach. In the context of the municipality reform Mutschelbach was then integrated into the newly created municipality Karlsbad.

==== Spielberg ====
Although it was first mentioned in documents in 1281 settlers from Grünwettersbach, nowadays a district of Karlsruhe, are told to have set over to the village - back then still called Spilberc - in 1161. Having been part of Württemberg previously it was sold to Baden-Durlach in 1603. For the following 200 years politically it belonged to Langensteinbach until 1803. In 1971, in the context of the municipality reform, this union was refreshed as Spielberg was integrated into Karlsbad.

==== Ittersbach ====
The first documentary mention reaches back to 1232, although back then known as Uitilspur. Throughout the history Ittersbach switched owners several times until the Thirty Years' War when it became part of Baden once and for all times. In 1854 the first industries settled down in Ittersbach and after World War II the economic situation improved even more as modern industries supplying both the German and the international market arrived at the industrial park about 2 km outside of the village. Among the companies acting on global markets and located in Ittersbach's industrial park is Harman Becker (vehicle audio) and Herrmann Ultraschalltechnik.

=== Neighbours ===
==== Karlsruhe ====
Karlsruhe

In the north Karlsbad borders to Karlsruhe and its neighbourhoods Stupferich and Palmbach. Both of these neighbourhoods form part of a group of neighbourhood known as Karlsruhe's Bergdörfer (mountain villages). Most of Karlsruhe is situated within the Upper Rhine Plain, not so the Bergdörfer: They are situated on the mountains of the northern Black Forest and the western Kraichgau. They share the autobahn exit Karlsbad, situated within their borders, with their neighbour municipality and are connected with it through the Landesstraßen L609 and L623.

===== Stupferich =====
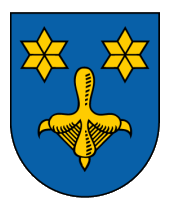
Stupferich

The village Stupferich is a southeastern neighbourhood of Karlsruhe. Until it was integrated into the city of Karlsruhe in 1972 it was an independent municipality. In 2000 the village celebrated its 900th anniversary. In December 2011 it had about 2,650 inhabitants.

===== Palmbach =====
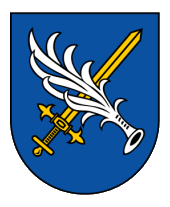
Palmbach

The village Palmbach is an eastern neighbourhood of Karlsruhe. Until it was integrated into the city of Karlsruhe in 1975 it formed part of the municipality Wetterbsbach composed of the villages Palmbach and Grünwettersbach. Palmbach was founded in 1701 by 28 Waldensian refugee families consisting of 111 people from La Balme in the French Alps on an area of 306 acres belonging to Grünwettersbach. They called their settlement La Balme, just like the place, they came from, which turned into the village's current name still during the 18th century. In March 2012 Palmbach had about 1,800 inhabitants.

==== Waldbronn ====
Waldbronn

The western frontier of Karlsbad leads to Waldbronn, a municipality in the district of Karlsruhe at the borders of the Alb-Pfinz Plateau and within the Alb Valley with some 12,500 inhabitants. Just like Karlsbad, this municipality is also product of the municipality reform in Baden-Württemberg. Its current constituent villages and former independent municipalities joined the former single-village municipality Reichenbach:

- Etzenrot and Neurod (joined in 1971)
- Busenbach (joined in 1972)

In 1974 the enlarged municipality Reichenbach was renamed and received the name Waldbronn

==== Marxzell ====
Marxzell

The southwestern frontier of Karlsbad borders to Marxzell, a municipality in the district of Karlsruhe with about 5,300 inhabitants (as of December 2011) consisting of the former independent municipalities

- Burbach:

Burbach, Marxzell (also part of the other two former municipalities], Metzlinschwander Hof and the houses Fischweier and Weimersmühle.

- Pfaffenrot:

Pfaffenrot and Gertrudenhof

- Schielberg:

Schielberg, "Bergschmiede, Hotel", Schlotterhof, Steinhäusle and Frauenalb

==== Remchingen ====
Remchingen

The municipality Remchingen in the Enz district borders to Karlsbad on the northeastern frontier of the last-mentioned. It is located within the Pfinz Valley, counts about 12,000 inhabitants and consists of the following former municipalities:

- Nöttingen (bordering to Auerbach),
- Wilferdingen
- Singen

Historic ties between Karlsbad and Remchingen become obvious comparing the coats of arms of the former municipalities. The flowers on Mutschelbach's coat of arms are quite similar to those of all three parts of Remchingen.

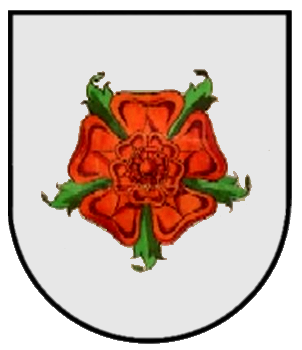
Noettingen

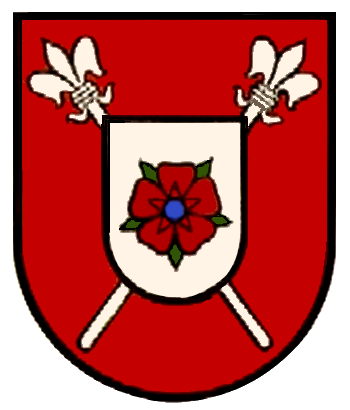
Wilferdingen

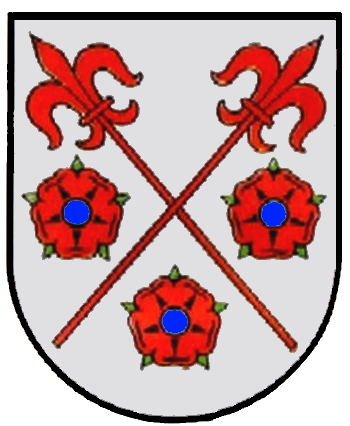
Singen

In addition, in both Nöttingen and Auerbach remains of Roman settlements have been found that can be dated back to circa 80 A.D.

==== Keltern ====
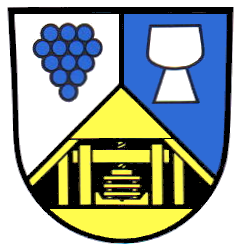
Keltern

To the east of Karlsbad borders Keltern, a municipality within the Enz district with approximately 9,000 inhabitants. It consists of the following villages:

- Dietenhausen
- Ellmendingen
- Weiler
- Dietenhausen
- Niebelsbach

==== Straubenhardt ====
Straubenhardt

This municipality is located southeast of Karlsbad. Straubenhardt forms part of the Enz district with a total of approximately 11,000 inhabitants and is made up of the following previously independent municipalities:

- Conweiler
- Feldrennach
- Pfinzweiler
- Langenalb
- Ottenhausen
- Schwann

== Politics ==
=== Coat of arms ===
Meaning of the coat of arms: The drinking bowl at the center of the coat of arms stands for the royal bath (Fürstenbad) established by Charles III William, Margrave of Baden-Durlach, in 1719 close to the Chapel of St. Barbara in Langensteinbach. It was this bathhouse that gave Karlsbad (Charles' Bath) its name. The five blue and silver (white) pales represent the five constituent villages: Auerbach, Mutschelbach, Spielberg, Ittersbach and Langensteinbach.

Colours of the coat of arms: blue and silver (white)

=== Municipal partnership ===
Karlsbad is a municipal partner of the following towns and municipalities:

- Heldrungen, Kyffhäuserkreis en Thuringia, Germany
- Hüttau, Salzburg (state) (Austria)

== Infrastructure ==
Karlsbad can be accessed via the road or by train. Baden Airpark, the closest international airport, is situated at a straight-line distance of about 34 kilometers.

=== Railway ===
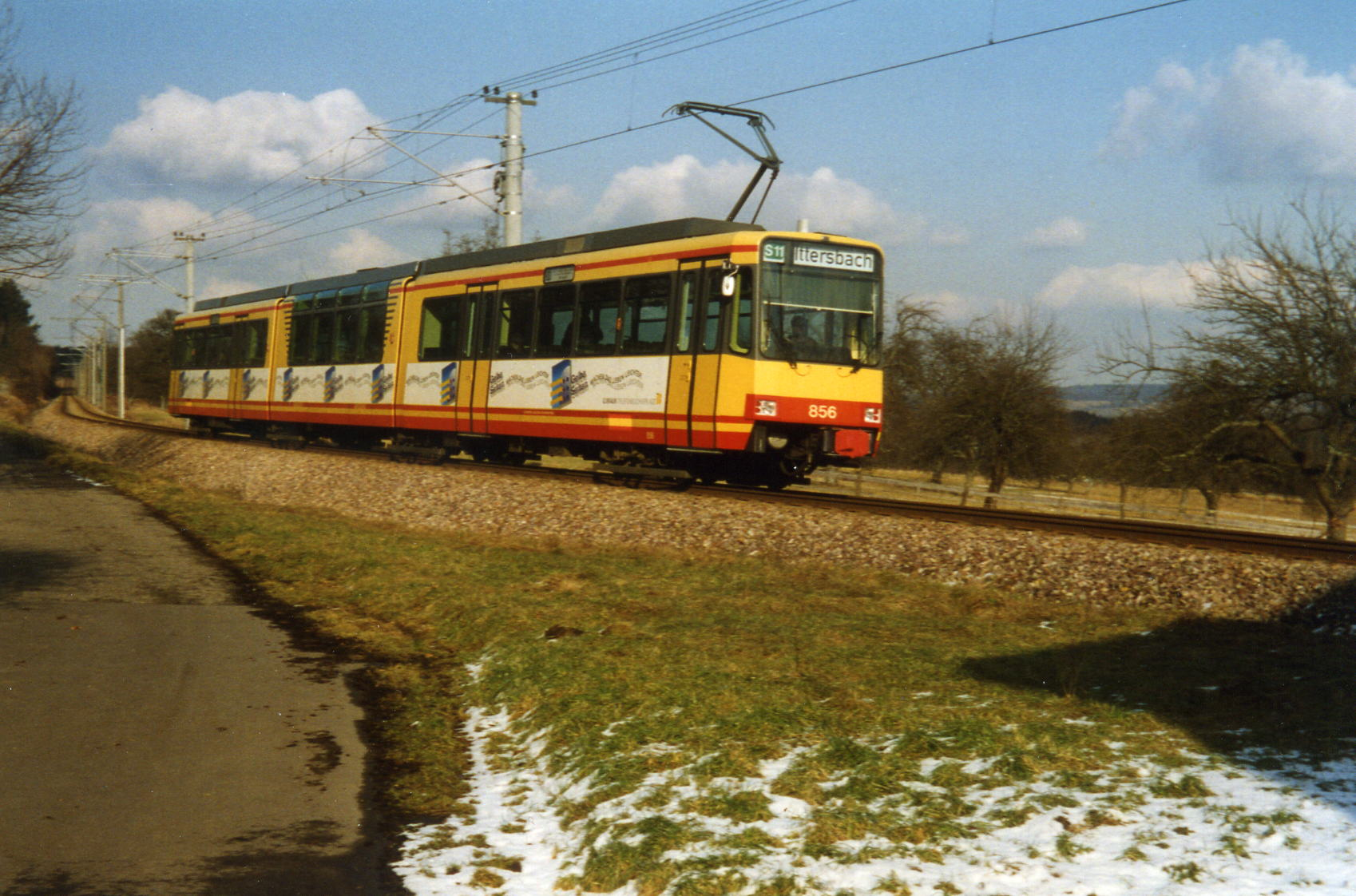
S11 close to Ittersbach in February 1996

Langensteinbach, Spielberg and Ittersbach are all connected to each other and to the cities of Karlsruhe and Ettlingen among others by the Busenbach–Ittersbach branch of the Alb Valley Railway (Albtalbahn), an electric railway that forms part of the Karlsruhe Stadtbahn. Ittersbach is the terminus of the branch, which operates as line S 11. Buses connect Auerbach an Mutschelbach to the mentioned railway through the train stops in Langensteinbach.

=== Additional public transport ===
In addition to the mentioned railway, six bus lines circulate in, to and from Karlsbad:

- KVV Line 153: Langensteinbach - Auerbach - Langensteinbach
- KVV Line 152: Langensteinbach - Mutschelbach - Langensteinbach
- KVV Line 118: Langensteinbach - Mutschelbach - Stupferich - Palmbach - Grünwettersbach (school days only)
- VPE Line 717 (708): Ittersbach - Pforzheim
- VPE Line 720: Ittersbach - Pforzheim
- VPE Line 721: Langensteinbach - Auerbach - Ellmendingen - Pforzheim

=== Road network ===

Karlsbad is connected to the German highway system and the European highway network by its exit on the A8 (European route E52) located about 5 km east of the Karlsruhe highway intersection.

Other main roads crossing Karlsbad are the following Landesstraßen:

- L562
- L563
- L564 (Albtalstraße, Alb Valley Road)
- L609
- L622
- L623

In former times especially Langensteinbach had serious traffic problems caused by several complicated road junctions controlled by traffic lights. The problem led to an interesting solution. Today Langensteinbach counts with two double roundabouts relieving the traffic conditions.

== Culture and sights ==
=== Celebrities closely linked to Karlsbad ===
- Fritz Rau, * 1930-2013 German concert and tour promoter and son of a smith from Ittersbach
- Horst Floth, 1934–2005, bobsleigh pilot
- Jens Nowotny, * 1974, until 1985 SV Spielberg, former DFB national football player

=== Historic buildings and structures ===
- Former town hall in Karlsbad-Spielberg
- Classical Protestant church in Karlsbad-Langensteinbach designed by Karl August Schwarz in Friedrich Weinbrenner-like style
- Ruins of the Saint Barbara chapel in Karlsbad-Langensteinbach, a chapel which can be dated back to 1330 AD.
- Ruins of the tower castle Burg Langensteinbach also called Römerturm (Roman tower), the remains of the former hill castle on site between 1100 and 1200 AD.
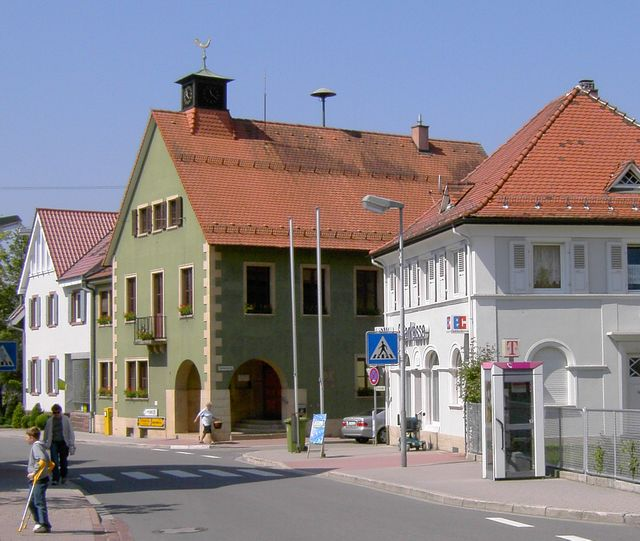
Former town hall in Karlsbad-Spielberg

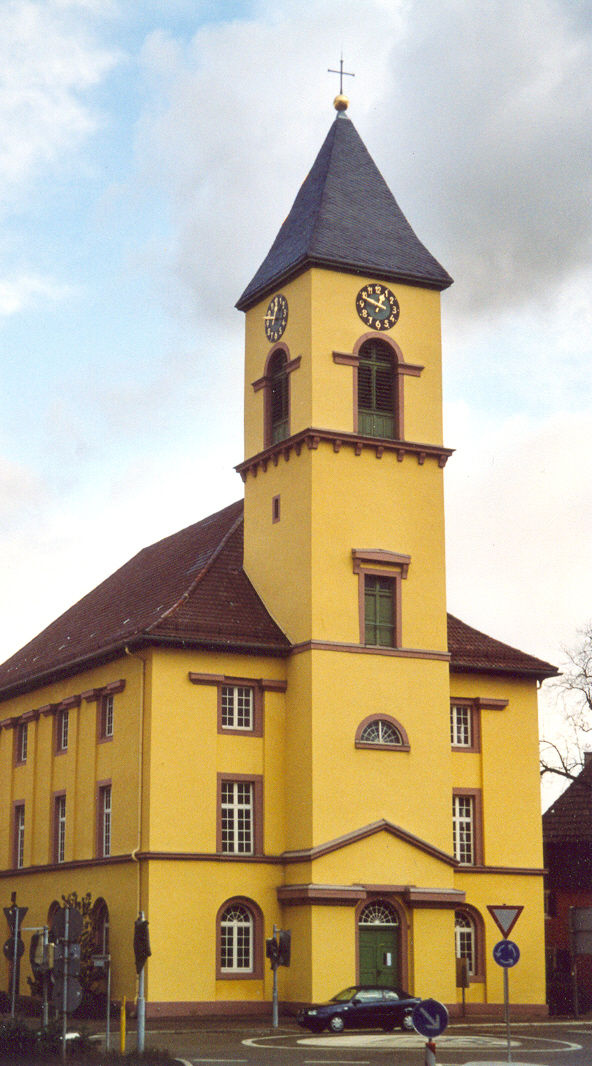
Ludwigskirche Langensteinbach

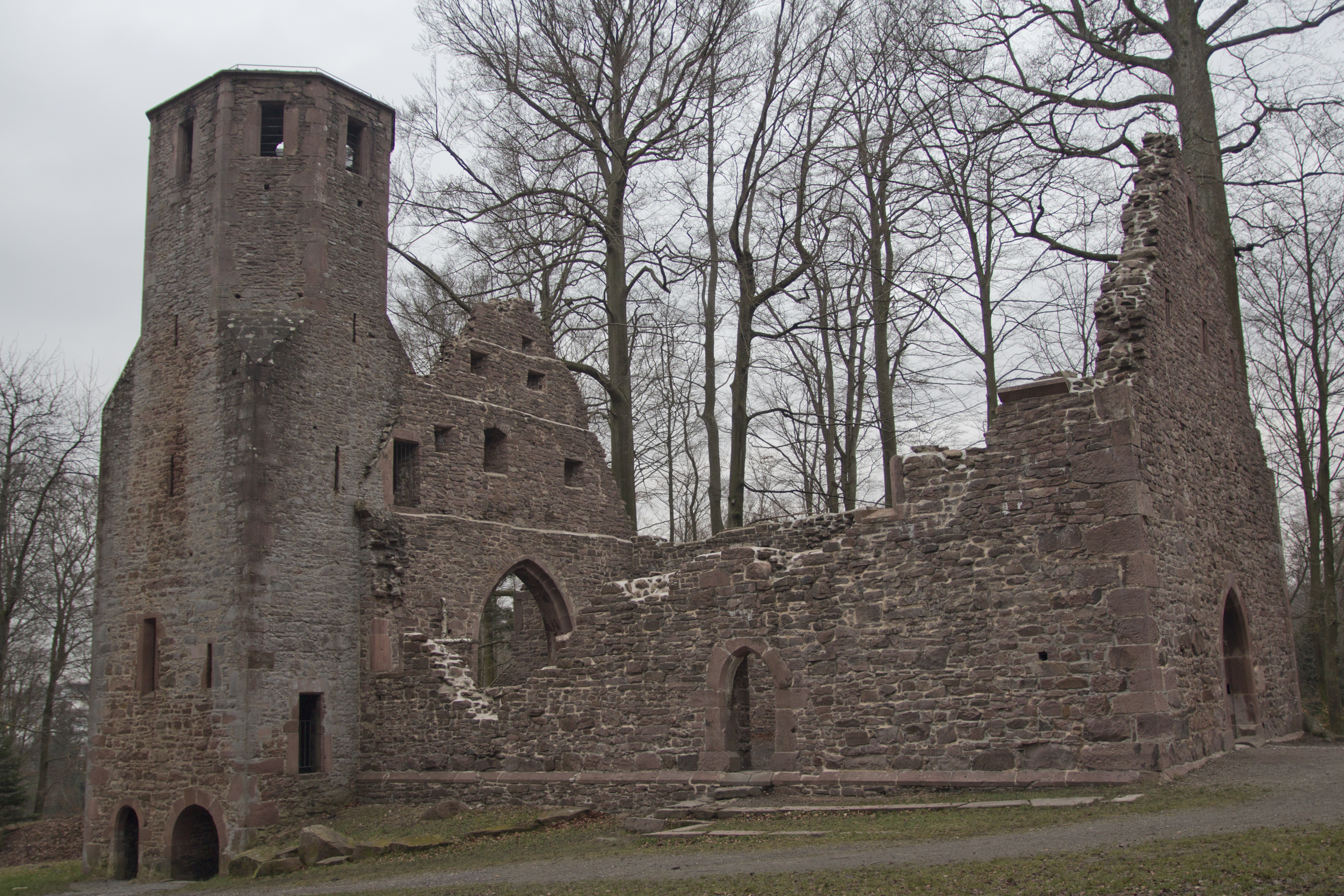
Ruins of St. Barbara chapel

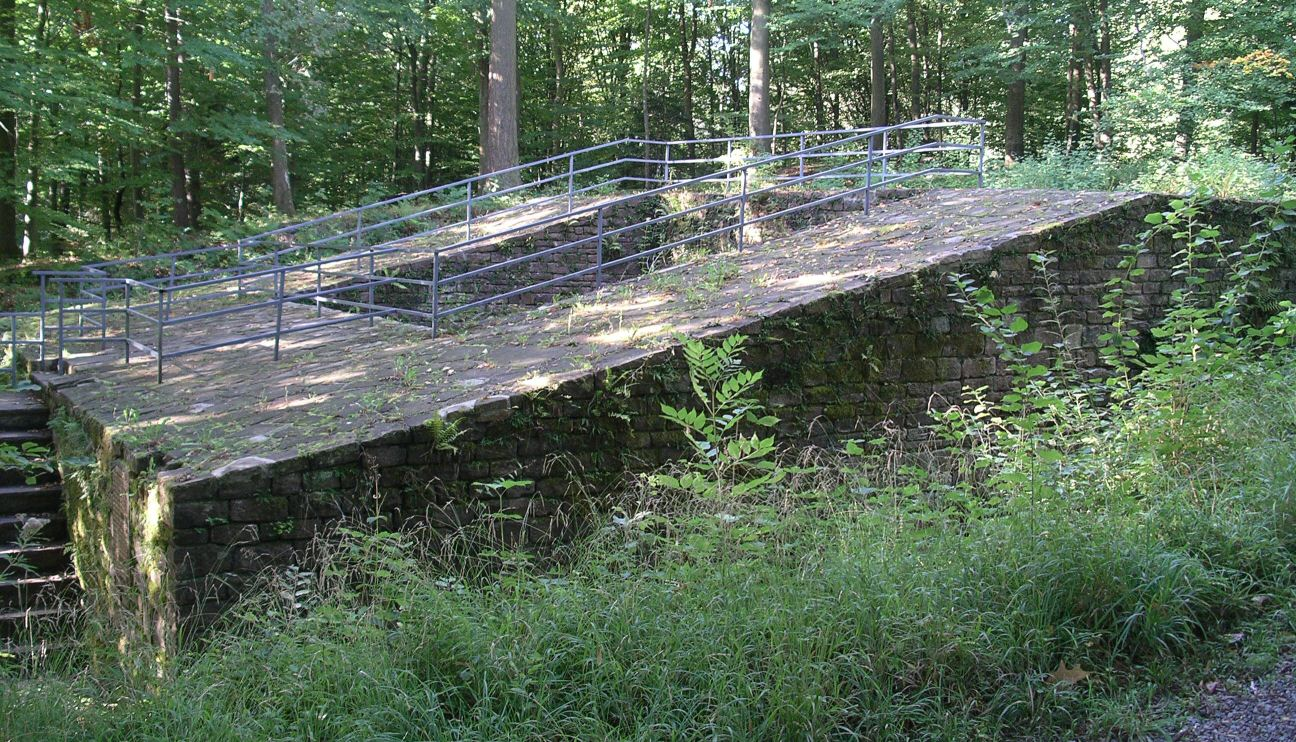
Ruins of the tower castle and the former hill castle

== Karlsbad worldwide ==
Around the globe there are several places named Karlsbad or Carlsbad:

- Karlovy Vary (previously known as Karlsbad) in the Czech Republic
- Carlsbad, California, United States of America
- Carlsbad, New Mexico, United States of America
- Carlsbad, Texas, United States of America
- Carlsbad Springs, Ontario, Canada
