= Mineraloelraffinerie Oberrhein =

Oil refinery company in Karlsruhe, Germany

MiRO Mineraloelraffinerie Oberrhein GmbH & Co. KG
- Company type: Private
- Industry: Oil refinery
- Founded: October 1, 1996; 29 years ago in Karlsruhe, Germany
- Headquarters: Karlsruhe, Germany
- Key people: Andreas Krobjilowski; Christoph Moser
- Owners: Shell plc (32.25%); Esso (25.00%); Rosneft (24.00%); Phillips 66 (18.75%)
- Number of employees: 1,100 (2024)
- Website: www.miro-ka.de

The MiRO Mineraloelraffinerie Oberrhein GmbH & Co. KG (MiRO) is the largest oil refinery of Germany located at the Upper Rhine in Karlsruhe.

== History ==
In 1962, the Esso-Raffinerie by Esso came into operation, followed by the DEA-Scholven GmbH oil refinery company in 1993. DEA-Scholven GmbH was later renamed Oberrheinische Mineralölwerke GmbH in 1969. Both refineries were located directly side by side in the Karlsruhe district Knielingen, only separated by the Alb river, which caused heavy competition. To be able to compete with refineries in other regions, these two refineries merged on October 1, 1996, into a single refinery company which was named MiRO Mineraloelraffinerie Oberrhein.

In response to the escalation of the Russo-Ukrainian War, the then German government Scholz cabinet placed the company Rosneft, which owns 25 percent of the MiRO, under trust of the Federal Network Agency on September 16, 2022.

== Production ==
Almost 99 percent of the petroleum the refinery processes in its production comes from the Transalpine Pipeline, which ends in Karlsruhe. The remaining one percent are delivered by trucks from smaller oil extraction sites located in the Palatinate region. The South European Pipeline, which ends in Karlsruhe too, is also connected to the MiRO refinery, but not in use anymore. That dependence from a single pipeline caused multiple outages in the past, like in December 2020, when cold weather conditions caused a failure of the pumps.

According to the companies own statements, around 15 million tons of petroleum are processed, resulting in production of one-third of the German gasoline consumption and one-eight of the German diesel consumption.
