= Karlsbad =

Karlsbad may refer to:

- Karlovy Vary, Czech Republic (formerly known by its German name Karlsbad)
- Karlsbad (Baden), Germany
- Melluži, Latvia, formerly known to tourists as Karlsbad

== See also ==
- Carlsbad (disambiguation)
