= Nordstadt =

Nordstadt may refer to:

- Dortmund § Nordstadt, a district of Dortmund, Germany
- Nordstadt (Hanover), a district of Hanover, Germany
- Nordstadt (Karlsruhe), a district of Karlsruhe Germany

== See also ==
- Hannover-Nordstadt station
- Nordstad
