= Oberwald (Karlsruhe) =

Urban park-like forest in Karlsruhe, Germany

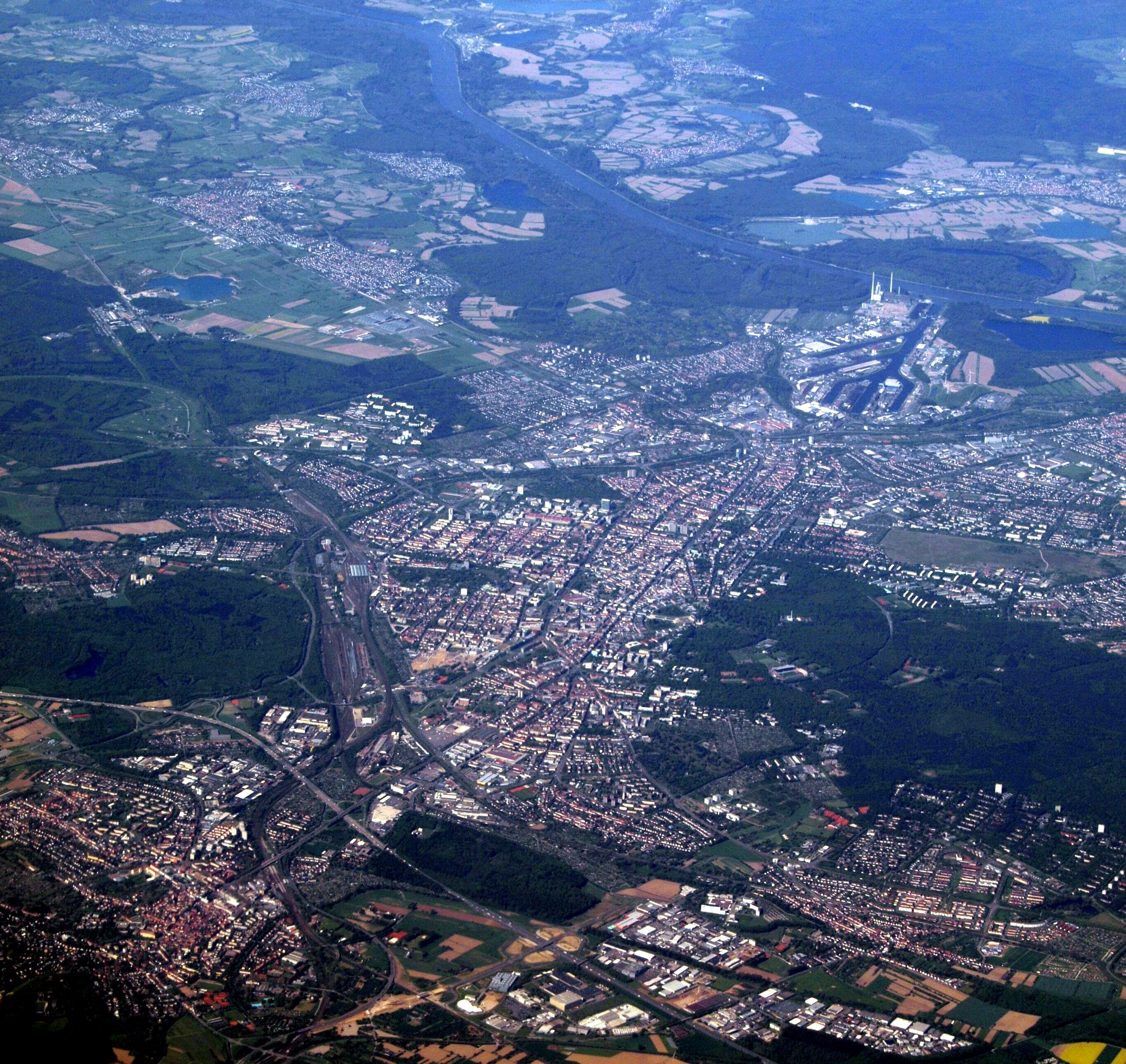
- Oberwald from above, far left below the middle

- Location within Baden-Württemberg
- Interactive map of Oberwald

Geography
- Location: Karlsruhe, Baden-Württemberg, Germany
- Coordinates: 48°58′54″N 8°25′29″E
- Elevation: 115 metres (377 ft)
- Area: 573.2 hectares (1,416 acres)

Administration
- Status: Landschaftsschutzgebiet
- Established: 29 March 1977
- Authority: City of Karlsruhe

Ecology
- Dominant tree species: Quercus robur, Carpinus betulus

The Oberwald in Karlsruhe, Germany, is an urban park-like forest and a Landschaftsschutzgebiet. It is known primarily for its freely accessible animal park, the Tierpark Oberwald, which is part of the Karlsruhe Zoo.

== Area ==
The Oberwald is located in the southeast of the city of Karlsruhe. The only city district directly adjacent to it is Rüppurr in the west. In the north, the Oberwald ends along the Südtangente street, which runs parallel to the Karlsruhe main station. In the east and south, the Oberwald is bordered by the Bundesautobahn 5 highway.

During the construction of the Südtangente street in 1969, large quantities of gravel were taken from the region of today's Oberwald. This resulted in the Erlachsee in the middle of the Oberwald, which is now fenced off for nature conservation purposes, as well as the smaller Oberwaldsee. Since the Oberwald is located in the region of the Kinzig-Murg-Rinne, which is a wetland and, together with the river Alb, poses a flood risk for districts such as Rüppurr, canals were built in the Oberwald after flooding on the Bundesautobahn 5 highway in May 1970, into which flood water can be discharged if necessary. The inflow to these canals comes from the Seegraben, the Hägenichgraben and the Scheidgraben, which are tributaries of the Alb.

On the northern edge of the Oberwald lies the Wasserwerk Durlacher Wald waterworks, planned by Robert Gerwig and put into operation in 1871, with a distinctive water tower, which today, however, is only used rarely due to the highways and the freight station in its vicinity.

The Oberwald has been designated as a Landschaftsschutzgebiet since March 29, 1977. The Erlachsee was also designated as a Naturschutzgebiet by the Regierungspräsidium Karlsruhe on November 20, 1983. A part of the Oberwald has been designated as a "Waldschutzgebiet" (forest conservation area) under the name Oberwald-Rißnert since May 31, 1988.

== Tierpark Oberwald ==
As more space was needed at the Karlsruhe Zoo due to the Bundesgartenschau in 1967, some animals were relocated to the Oberwald. Today, there are over 100 animals of 12 different species on 12 hectares, including mainly endangered species such as the Przewalski's horse and the European bison.

Over time, the Tierpark Oberwald has expanded into the adjacent forests. The Tierpark Oberwald also includes an enclosure with wild boars in Grünwettersbach, an enclosure with European fallow deers in Hohenwettersbach and enclosures with wild boars, fallow deer and red deer in Rappenwört.
