= Nordweststadt =

Nordweststadt may refer to:

- Nordweststadt (Karlsruhe), a borough of Karlsruhe
- Frankfurt-Nordweststadt, a borough of Frankfurt
