= Palmbach =

District of Karlsruhe

- Borough of Karlsruhe
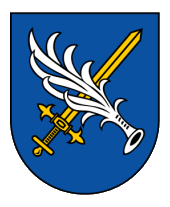
- Coat of arms

- Location of Palmbach within Karlsruhe
- Interactive map of Palmbach
- Location within Germany Location within Baden-Württemberg
- Coordinates: 48°57′N 8°29′E
- Country: Germany
- State: Baden-Württemberg
- District: Urban district
- City: Karlsruhe

Area
  - Total: 1.3763 km^{2} (0.5314 sq mi)
- Elevation: 264 m (866 ft)

Population (2022-12-31)
  - Total: 1,974
  - Density: 1,434/km^{2} (3,715/sq mi)
- Time zone: UTC+01:00 (CET)
  - Summer (DST): UTC+02:00 (CEST)
- Postal codes: 76228
- Dialling codes: 0721

Palmbach is the smallest district of the Baden-Württemberg city of Karlsruhe. The Waldensian town of Palmbach is located on the southeastern edge of the urban area and was incorporated into the city of Karlsruhe on January 1, 1975. Naturally, it is located in the northern Black Forest, is the highest residential area in Karlsruhe and has been part of the Central/North Black Forest Nature Park since January 2021.

Palmbach is located directly at the Karlsbad motorway exit of the Bundesautobahn 8 and is one of the high-altitude districts of Karlsruhe that are called "mountain villages" in the region.

== History ==
28 Waldensian refugee families came to Grünwettersbach in 1701. They were expelled from the Waldensian valleys, in what is now Piedmont, because of their Reformed faith. In 1702 they founded the Waldensian colony of Palmbach on 360 acres of land. The place was initially named La Balme, like the former hometown of the Waldensians. In 1725 the place name "Palmbach" appeared in the marriage register for the first time. In the same year the first small church was built in town. At the same time, 12 families moved on to Prussia, leaving behind 96 residents.

The Waldensians largely isolated themselves from the Grünwettersbacher inhabitants, but maintained close contact with the Waldensian settlements in Untermutschelbach and Walldorf (today Mörfelden-Walldorf) as well as the Württemberg Waldensian colonies near Mühlacker. Through the Tausch- und Epurationsvertrag (exchange and purification agreement) of 1806, the place became part of Baden. German was introduced as the official language in schools and churches.

In the 19th century, many of the farmers used the industrialized businesses in the area to make a living. Between 1830 and 1870, 84 of the 300 residents emigrated to North America.

On January 1, 1972, Palmbach merged with Grünwettersbach to form the municipality of Wettersbach in order to jointly prevent its incorporation into Karlsruhe, but this only succeeded until January 1, 1975. The place got its previous name back when it was incorporated into Karlsruhe and today has around 1,950 inhabitants.

== Traffic ==
Palmbach is connected to the Karlsruher Verkehrsverbund network. During rush hour there is a bus connection every 10 minutes with line 47 to Zündhütle (tram stop) or to the Karlsruhe Hauptbahnhof. There is also bus line 27 connections to Durlach, the largest district of Karlsruhe. Since December 2018, there has been a new bus connection to the neighboring Karlsruhe district from Monday to Friday: bus line 158 from Durlach - Zündhütle via Palmbach to Langensteinbach to the Langensteinbach train station there and on to the SRH clinic. The school bus also goes to the Langensteinbach school center. Bus line 47A goes to Waldbronn-Ermlisgrund with some trips.

At weekends, the NL3 night line offers a continuous hourly night connection to Karlsruhe.

== Tourist attractions ==
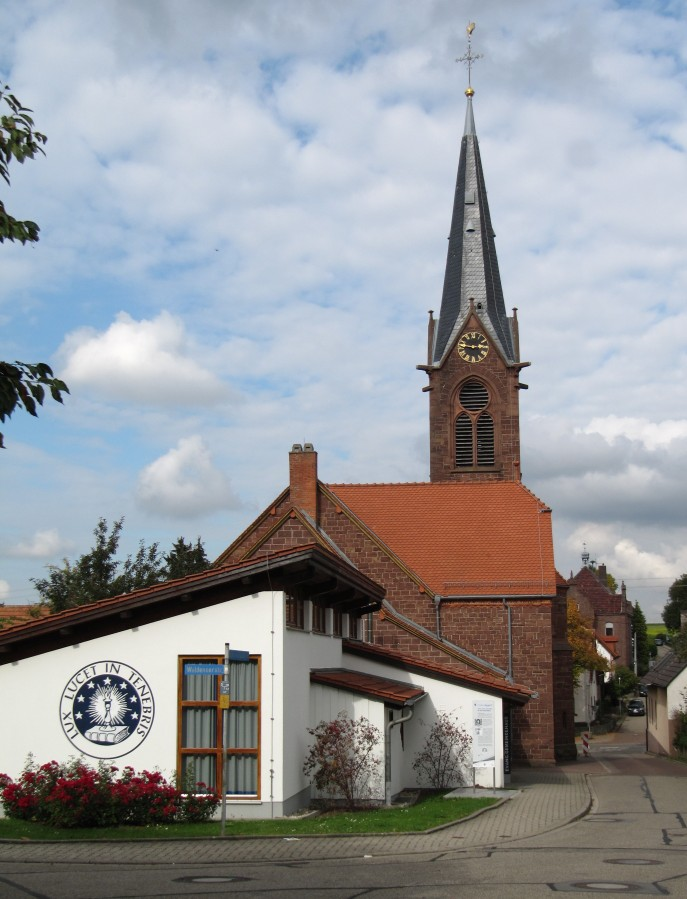
Parish hall of the Protestant Waldensian Church in Palmbach with coat of arms

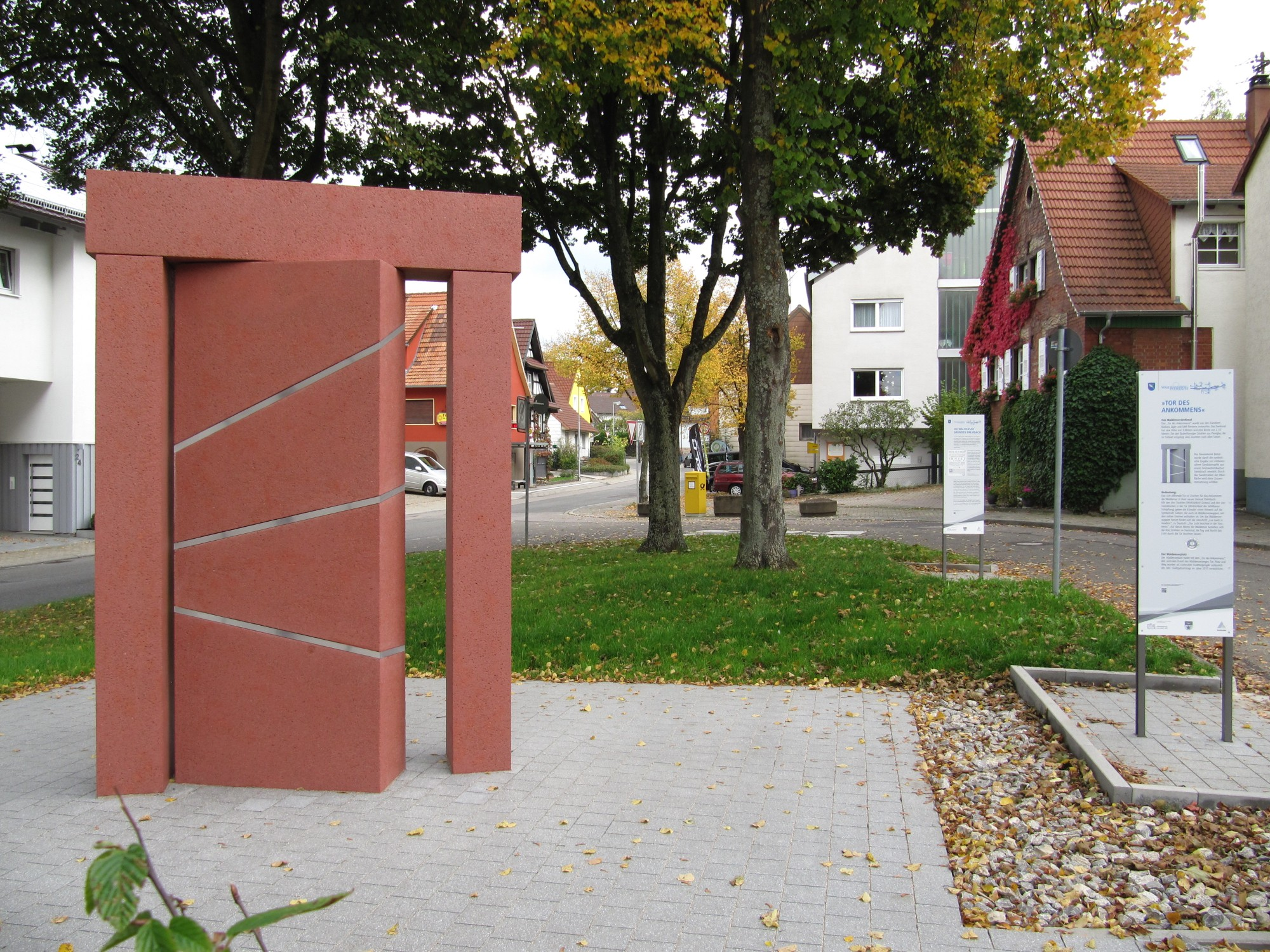
Waldenserplatz in Palmbach

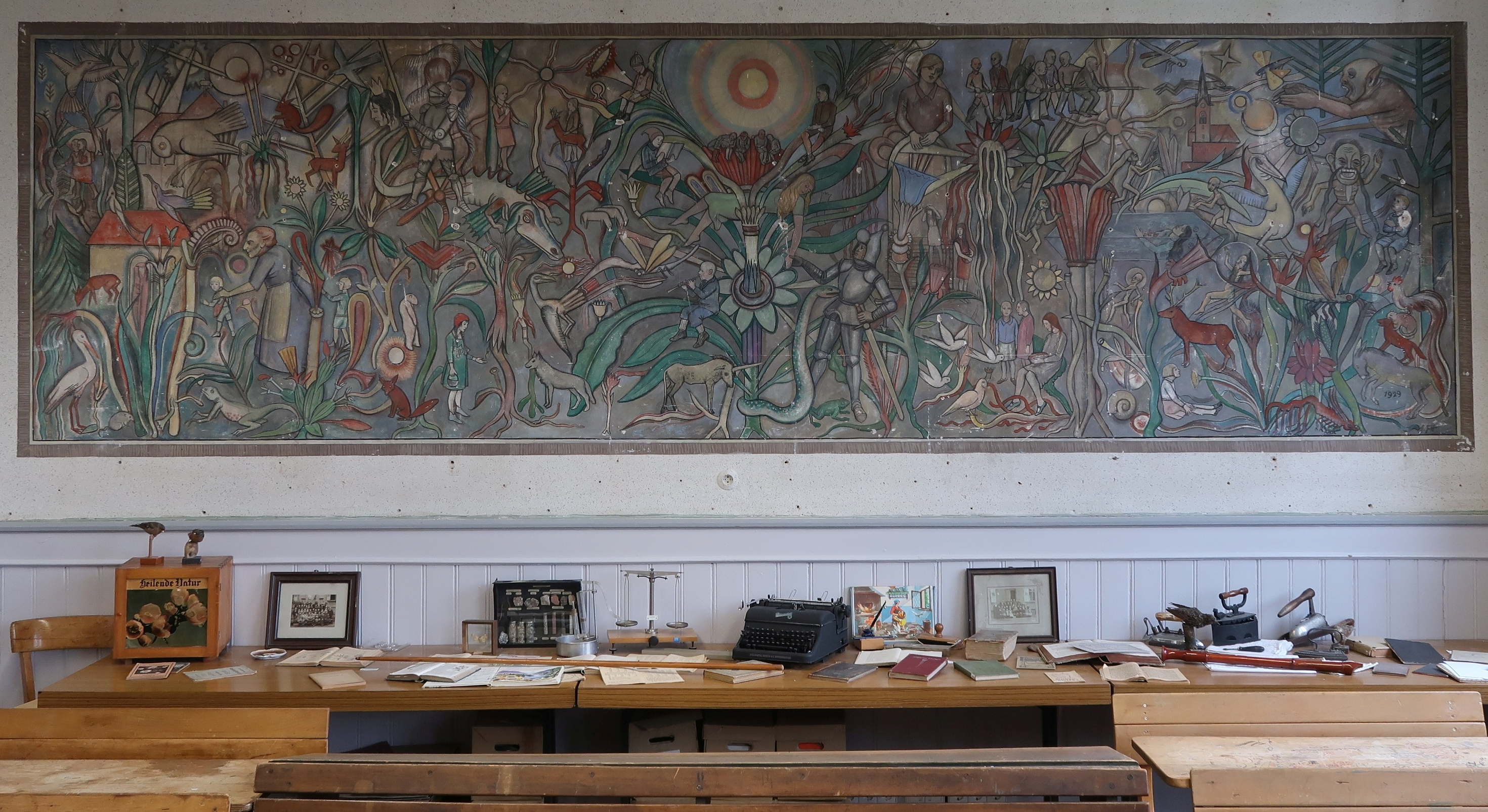
Painting Palmbacher Märchenwelt by Hans Fischer-Schuppach in the Badisches Schulmuseum

The Wettersbach Sculpture Park, which extends across the Palmbach and Grünwettersbach districts, was opened in 2009. In the summer of 2014, the Baden School Museum Karlsruhe moved into the former Waldensian school. The Palmbacher Märchenwelt (Palmbach fairytale world) by the well-known German painter and graphic artist Hans Fischer-Schuppach from 1929 can also be viewed there. The Waldenserweg with the Waldensian monument Tor des Ankommens (Gate of Arrival) were inaugurated in 2015. It was designed by the artists Barbara Jäger and OMI Riesterer and found its place on the new Waldenserplatz. Along the Waldenserweg, 24 display boards in 12 places tell the story of the historical sites and buildings of Palmbach (such as the Waldensian Church), as well as the history of the Waldensians. The Waldensian Church is open daily for visits and prayer.

== Notable people ==
- Otto Lieb (died February 12, 1968) aerobatic pilot, participant in the German Aerobatic Championships, crashed during a training flight near Forchheim airfield.
- Jerôme Gondorf (born June 26, 1988) soccer player under contract with Karlsruher SC.
- Christian Ortag (born January 14, 1995) soccer player under contract with SSV Ulm 1846.
