= Weststadt (Karlsruhe) =

District of Karlsruhe

- Borough of Karlsruhe
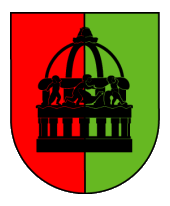
- Coat of arms

- Location of Weststadt within Karlsruhe
- Interactive map of Weststadt
- Location within Germany Location within Baden-Württemberg
- Coordinates: 49°1′N 8°23′E
- Country: Germany
- State: Baden-Württemberg
- District: Urban district
- City: Karlsruhe

Area
  - Total: 1.7251 km^{2} (0.6661 sq mi)

Population (2014-06-30)
  - Total: 19,849
  - Density: 11,506/km^{2} (29,800/sq mi)
- Time zone: UTC+01:00 (CET)
  - Summer (DST): UTC+02:00 (CEST)
- Postal codes: 76133, 76135, 76185
- Dialling codes: 0721

Weststadt (German pronunciation: [ˈvɛstˌʃtat], lit. 'west city') is a district in the west of Karlsruhe between the city center and the older district of Mühlburg. The most famous part of the district is the avenue Kaiserallee.

== History ==
The area south of the Kaiserallee was an industrial area from the Gründerzeit era, where the first gasworks and the beer cellars of the Karlsruhe breweries were located, which then also moved their increasingly industrial production facilities here. The dense Art Nouveau residential development that was added later has shaped this area to this day, even after the industry moved away.

On the site of today's Gutenbergplatz there was initially an execution site until 1829, then a shooting range for the military from 1867 to 1898.

The northern part was a government and residential area from the beginning and has remained so to this day. The striking beginning at Mühlburger-Tor-Platz is the Rathaus West (city hall), followed by the Generallandesarchiv Karlsruhe (state archive), the Oberlandesgericht Karlsruhe (court), the Justizvollzugsanstalt Karlsruhe (prison, designed by Josef Durm in 1897 in the style of an Italian palazzo with consideration for the surroundings), the municipal psychiatry and the State Academy of Fine Arts Karlsruhe.

The northern part is crossed by the Hildapromenade, the route of the original Maxau Railway, which was used as an urban green space after its relocation and named after the last Grand Duchess of Baden Princess Hilda of Nassau.
