= Karlsruhe Zoo =

Zoo in Karlsruhe, Germany

Coordinates: 48°59′52″N 8°24′06″E

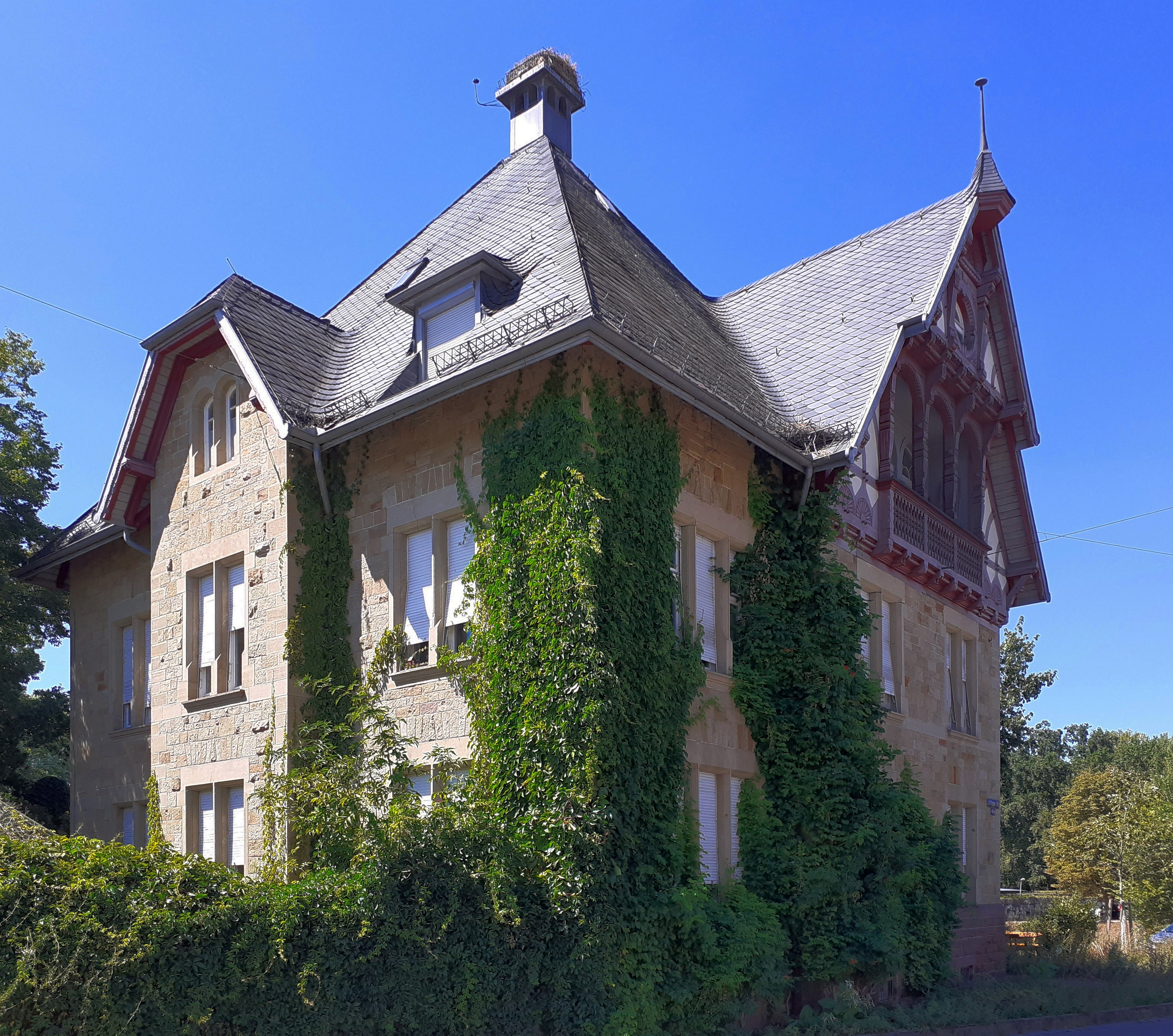
- Karlsruhe Zoo. Office, 2015
- Interactive map of Karlsruhe Zoo
- Date opening: 1865
- No. of animals: 3000
- No. of species: 250
- Website: www.karlsruhe.de/zoo

The Karlsruhe Zoo (German: Zoologischer Stadtgarten Karlsruhe) is a city garden with a zoo in the southwest of Karlsruhe, Germany. It also encompasses the outer area; Tierpark Oberwald in the southeast of the city. The main area totals 22 hectares (of which nine hectares are zoo), and the Oberwald Zoo has an area of 16 hectares. A total of around 3000 animals of over 240 species live at the Zoologische Stadtgarten Karlsruhe. The city garden is located north of the Karlsruhe Hauptbahnhof and south of the Karlsruhe Congress between the Karlsruhe districts of Südstadt and Südweststadt. The zoo was opened in 1865, making it one of the oldest zoos in Germany. The city garden and zoo form a common, enclosed area and cannot be visited separately.

The site is managed by two municipal authorities, the horticultural office and the zoo. The Zoological City Garden in its entirety is under monument protection.

== History ==
As early as 1861, there were first efforts to found a zoo in the Baden residence city of Karlsruhe. The initiators were the members of the newly founded association for poultry breeding. The proposal to set up a poultry park and supplement it with additional show enclosures for mammals was taken up and pursued in 1864. The Grand Duke, Friedrich I of Baden complied with a request for funding and had the southern part of the Sallenwäldchen provided together with Lake Ludwig for an annual rent of three guilders for the construction of a zoo. The necessary capital for the establishment would be raised through debt securities. The owners of these bonds formed the Tiergartengesellschaft, which was to operate the newly founded Tiergarten together with the poultry breeding association. The construction of the first plants took only a few months. In addition to funds, the Grand Duke also provided some animals from his collection. However, the planned financing ceiling of 50,000 guilders could not be raised until the opening. Only shares had been issued for a total of 25,000 guilders. The financing gap inhibited the expansion of the zoo.

Once the private founders could no longer bear the costs, on 30 November 1868, a newly founded zoo association took over the park and applied for financial support from the city. This support was granted with loans and annual grants, and the zoo was able to expand at a more rapid pace. In 1869, 50,000 people visited the zoo, whose livestock could be continuously expanded through the foundations of the Grand Duke and donations from the population.

In 1877, the entire inventory and the animal facilities became municipal property. At the same time, the site was expanded and the first larger garden was created. Under the direction of the garden director Friedrich Ries, the park developed into a well-known and popular excursion destination. In 1899, the first rose garden was created with around 3600 rose plants in 800 varieties.

In 1887, the construction of an artificial hill with a built-in high reservoir for the water supply of the city was decided for the city garden area. The project was completed in June 1893 and used until November 1967. The resulting Lauterberg is the highest elevation of Karlsruhe's core city with 154 meters.

The opening of the Hagenbeck Zoo in Stellingen near Hamburg in 1907, with its mostly grid-less animal facilities, also influenced the design of other zoos, which now wanted to show all panoramic landscapes or at least outdoor facilities. In 1913, the first sea lions moved into an outdoor facility, which is now the oldest still existing facility in Karlsruhe Zoo.

In 1914, combined with the construction and commissioning of Karlsruhe Central Station, the garden area of the zoo, the so-called city garden, was significantly expanded. Among other things, a new rose garden was created. In place of the old one, the construction of the Japanese Garden began in 1918.

In the following period, the animal stand was also expanded with exotic animals: in 1923 the zoo received a king tiger and in 1924 the then three-year-old elephant Molly. The elephant cow remained in the Karlsruhe Zoo until its death in 1941.

Before the beginning of the Second World War, the animal population had grown considerably, and there were considerations to move the zoo from the city center to the outskirts of the city. This did not happen. In the war, the facilities were severely damaged and the surviving animals were handed over to other zoos. The grounds of the city garden were used for vegetable cultivation to supply the starving population.

In 1947, two years after the end of the war, the reconstruction of the zoo began with the construction of new animal enclosures. In 1949, the zoo including the city garden was reopened. The animal population was continuously expanded and at the beginning of the 1960s the zoo had surpassed the pre-war level.

The following years were devoted to the intensive preparation of the 1967 Federal Garden Show in Karlsruhe. In 1965, the Oberwald Zoo was therefore built in the nearby city forest in order to create space for garden areas by outsourcing animals.

For the Federal Garden Show, the garden area was completely redesigned, but the animal facilities were also expanded. Just in time for the opening of the garden show, which was attended by over six million guests, a new facility for polar bears was inaugurated. With eleven polar bears, the zoo housed the largest group of polar bears in Europe at that time. The new monkey house was opened in 1968.

In April 1973, four brown bears broke out of their enclosure when it was likely improperly closed. The largest bear bit an employee's leg when it was loaded into a box and was then shot by a police officer. In 1975, the parrot house – the South American house, which was demolished in 2018 due to the expansion of the elephant facility – was completed. In the 1980s, mainly existing renovation measures and some small construction projects were completed. In June 1984, the zoo restaurant burned. It was believed to be negligent or intentional arson. The property damage amounted to one million German marks.

In July 1984, three hippos died from circulatory collapse because a playing elephant had opened the hot water supply to the neighboring hippo pool through a slider. In September 1984, a baby sea lion was sucked into a drain pipe and died. On an October night in 1985, three flamingos were killed by unknown persons. In August 1987, four wolves broke out of their enclosure. One of them died of an overdose of the anesthetic used to capture it.

In the 1990s, the African Savannah, a new chimpanzee facility, and new outdoor enclosures at the predator house were completed and the outdoor facility for elephants was redesigned.

During the reconstruction of their enclosure, all four polar bears (one male and three females) were given to the Nuremberg Zoo. After an unknown person broke open the door of the enclosure there in March 2000, they broke out and threatened zoo visitors. Because an anesthetic did not succeed and an outbreak from the zoo grounds was feared, all four animals were shot. The new polar bear enclosure was opened in October 2000.

On the night of 13 November 2010, there was a fire in which 26 animals died. The fire destroyed the petting zoo and killed all the animals in it before it spread to the elephant house and caused severe burns to the animals housed there. Already in the summer of 2011, a new, larger, petting zoo at the north entrance was inaugurated.

For the 150th anniversary in 2015, the zoo received, among other things, a new petting enclosure, the Himalayan mountain world and in the anniversary year itself the coatis facility and the exotic house in the former Tullabad.

In May 2019, the expanded outdoor area of the elephant facility was opened, which is also used by the hippos at night in summer at appropriate temperatures. The conversion into a retirement home for elephants is now complete.

In May 2022, the last lioness was euthanized. This ended the lion keeping of the zoo.

== Animal enclosures ==
The Stadtgarten Karlsruhe presents its enclosures as animal experience worlds that are intended to represent various zoogeographical regions of the world, such as African, Australian and South American fauna.

The plant of the flamingos is located directly at the main entrance (Kasse Süd). One facility to which the zoo attaches particular importance is the facility for polar bears opened in 2000: The replica of the Arctic and tundra habitat is divided into three enclosure sections in order to be able to separate polar bear mothers with children from the adult animals. The iceberg replicas are particularly striking. Through viewing windows, the animals can also be observed swimming underwater. During the construction of the enclosure, the four polar bears were lost, who were outsourced to Nuremberg for the duration of the measure and were able to escape there after an act of sabotage and were shot. Thus, the new and forward-looking enclosure first had to be equipped with two elderly females, on loan from Rotterdam. Today's occupation Vitus, Nika and Larissa came to Karlsruhe from Rostock, Vienna and Stuttgart.

In continuation of the concept of habitat water, the new enclosures for seals and penguins were handed over to their destination in August 2009 after one and a half years of construction. Thus, seals and Californian sea lions now find space for their activities on almost 900 m2 on land and in the water. €4.4 million was raised for the modernization of the enclosures, which is reflected in the enlargement of pools and outdoor areas, but above all also increased the observation possibilities for the audience.

The enclosures for Bennett kangaroos and emus in the wildlife area of Australia are designated as other animal paddocks.

The giraffe house contains animals of the African Savannah such as zebras, antelopes, ostriches and meerkats. The African savannah area also shows Watussi cattle. As a giraffe species, the Karlsruhe Zoo holds net giraffes. The zoo also shows hooved animals north of the savannah area in its own enclosure.

On the southeast slope of the Lauterberg, the plant ensemble Bergwelt Himalaya is set up. There, visitors can see snow leopards and red pandas, around since 2011 and 2013 respectively. Located on the southern slope of the Lauterberg, the redesigned facility for Persian goiter cells is presented afterwards. Bird aviaries for owls are located above on the southern slope of the Lauterberg. Since April 2015, the subsequent 450m² outdoor facility for coatis, one of the largest facilities of its kind in Germany, can be visited. To the northwest of it is a lynx paddock. On the northwest edge of the Lauterberg there are various small enclosures that offer space for dwarf otters and several kinds of meerkat.

Ponds with ducks and other water birds from all over the world, monkey islands for lemurs and cling monkeys from South America are also available.

In addition to chimpanzees – as the only great ape species kept – other monkey species from Africa are shown in the monkey house. The predator house houses, among other mammals and reptiles, Chinese leopards and salt cats. Until 2022, the lioness Safo also lived here.

In the northeast of the city garden, the exotic house was built in the summer of 2015 after two and a half years of conversion of a former indoor pool, the Tullabades. With around 2000 animals in almost 100 animal species, the exotic house offers a large variety of different animals. The largest community is formed by the animals living freely in the large hall – over 30 species of birds, liss monkeys and white-faced sakis. In 2018, the two-toed sloths moved into a large aviary in socialization with spring tamarins, Azara's agutis and golden parakeets. Various animals are also associated in the two other large aviaries fitted into the landscape, in the terrariums, aquariums and paludariums. The Seychelles giant tortoise or the spectacle leaf-nosed bats with their large bat cave also have their own enclosures. In the exotic house, zoo pedagogy now also has its own event rooms for the first time. Areas for kindergartens, classrooms for schools are set up, there is a seminar room for lecture series, workshops or even holiday courses. South outside the exotic house a parrot aviary can be found.

Another enclosure for flamingos and facilities for Asian elephants and hippos can be found in the zoo's pachyderm house. The elephants shown here live in the so-called "senior residence", which was put into operation in 2019.
