= Landesanstalt für Umwelt Baden-Württemberg =

Baden-Württemberg State Institute for the Environment
- LUBW Landesanstalt für Umwelt Baden-Württemberg
- Established: 1 January 2006
- Type: Public legal body and state institution
- Headquarters: Karlsruhe
- Region served: Baden-Württemberg
- Leader: Margareta Barth (President)
- Parent organisation: Ministry of the Environment, Climate and Energy Economy, Baden-Württemberg
- Staff: 550
- Website: www.lubw.baden-wuerttemberg.de

The Baden-Württemberg State Institute for the Environment (German: LUBW Landesanstalt für Umwelt Baden-Württemberg), until December 1, 2017 Landesanstalt für Umwelt, Messungen und Naturschutz Baden-Württemberg (LUBW), is a central institution of the German federated state of Baden-Württemberg, whose legal responsibilities lie in the fields of environmental conservation, health and safety and consumer protection and thus they support the state authorities at a technical level in nature conservation and radiation protection.

The head office of the LUBW is in Karlsruhe; in 2015 it had 550 employees and an annual budget of €65 million.
