= Daxlanden =

District of Karlsruhe

- Borough of Karlsruhe
- Coat of arms

- Location of Daxlanden within Karlsruhe
- Interactive map of Daxlanden
- Location within Germany Location within Baden-Württemberg
- Coordinates: 49°00′07″N 8°20′13″E
- Country: Germany
- State: Baden-Württemberg
- District: Urban district
- City: Karlsruhe

Population (2020-12-31)
  - Total: 11,489
- Time zone: UTC+01:00 (CET)
  - Summer (DST): UTC+02:00 (CEST)
- Postal codes: 76189
- Dialling codes: 0721

Daxlanden is a district of Karlsruhe, Germany. The former fishing village lies west of the city center of Karlsruhe, near the Rhine on the river Alb and comprises about 11,500 inhabitants.

The district is further divided into Alt-Daxlanden, Neu-Daxlanden, Daxlanden-Ost and Rheinstrandsiedlung.

== History ==
Daxlanden was first mentioned in 1261 as "villa daslar" in a papal document. However, the place is certainly older, as indicated by existence of the Weißenburg Monastery and Gottesaue Monastery.

In 1396, the "Appen Mill" in Daxlanden was first mentioned upon its donation to the hospital in Baden (today Baden-Baden).
The Appen Mill remained property of the hospital until into the 18th century and was the official mill of the surrounding boroughs Bulach, Beiertheim, Daxlanden, Mühlburg and Knielingen.

In 1407, Archbishop to Cologne Friedrich III. von Saarwerden settled a dispute over hunting rights in the "Daheslarerau" and surrounding areas between Rupert, King of Germany, and Bernard I, Margrave of Baden-Baden in favour of the former.

In 1463, Daxlanden established its own parish, previously it belonged to the parish of Forchheim. With the division of the Margraviate of Baden, Daxlanden was designated to Baden-Baden and belonged therewith to the Ettlingen Council. The boom years Gold panning in the gold fields in Daxlanden were in 1579. From the 18th century on they have been fruitless.

On the 6th of March 1651 the worst catastrophe in the history of Daxlanden occurred. A break in the dam on the Rhein destroyed 700 acres of fields, 20 houses and the local church. As a consequence of this, half of Daxlanden was at risk of dropping into the Rhein. Following many such flooding catastrophes afflicting the borough, a new Daxlanden was established on a high bank further from the Rhein.

In 1665, the Appen Mill that had been destroyed in the Thirty Years War was rebuilt.

1673/77 saw new dams for the Rhein being constructed around Daxlanden and Rappenwörth. It had been attempted many times to restrain the Rhein through dam building.
