= Karlsruhe Municipal Hospital =

Hospital in Karlsruhe, Germany

Städtisches Klinikum Karlsruhe gGmbH

Geography
- Location: Karlsruhe, Baden-Württemberg, DE
- Coordinates: 49.01744°N 8.37267°E

Organisation
- Type: District general

Services
- Emergency department: Yes
- Beds: 1591

History
- Opened: 1907

Links
- Website: www.klinikum-karlsruhe.de

The Karlsruhe Municipal Hospital (German: Städtisches Klinikum Karlsruhe) is a hospital in Karlsruhe, Germany and the largest hospital in the middle upper rhine region. It is located in the Nordweststadt borough and has 1,591 beds. Of a total of 4,756 employees, 664 are physicians. In 2022, 191,585 people received outpatient care and 51,435 people received inpatient care. The Karlsruhe Municipal Hospital is a medical school hospital of the University Medical Center Freiburg.

== History ==
The Karlsruhe Municipal Hospital has its origins in the "Bürgerspital am Lidellplatz" (English: Citizens Hospital at Lidellplatz) that was founded in 1788. From 1903 to 1907, the "Städtische Krankenanstalten Karlsruhe" buildings on Moltkestrasse, which are now listed as historical monuments, were built according to plans by Karlsruhe city architect Wilhelm Strieder. The complex, which opened in 1907, was considered one of the most modern and spacious clinics in Germany at the turn of the 19th century. In the same year, the first radiography machine was put into operation in the surgical department. Initially, surgery, internal medicine, two isolation departments for scarlet fever, diphtheria and other infectious diseases, departments for venereal and skin diseases and a department for the "mentally ill" were housed in ten buildings. The 600 patients were each treated in three classes. In February 1934, a newly built operating theater wing was inaugurated, which was destroyed by bombs in 1944. After the World War II, the clinic was briefly used by the American armed forces as a military hospital.
