= Carlsbad =

Carlsbad may refer to:

== Geographical locations ==
- Carlsbad, California, San Diego County, United States
  - Carlsbad Santa Fe Depot, NRHP ID No. 93001016
- Carlsbad, New Mexico, United States
  - Carlsbad Caverns National Park
  - Carlsbad Irrigation District, NRHP ID No. 66000476
- Carlsbad, Texas, Tom Green County, United States
- Karlovy Vary, Czech Republic; alternatively known as Carlsbad
- Carlsbad Springs, Ontario, Canada

== Astronomy ==
- Carlsbad (crater), Asteroid 951 Gaspra

== See also ==
- Karlsbad (disambiguation)
