= Oberwaldberg =

Mountain in Germany

Coordinates: 49°59′19″N 8°35′31″E

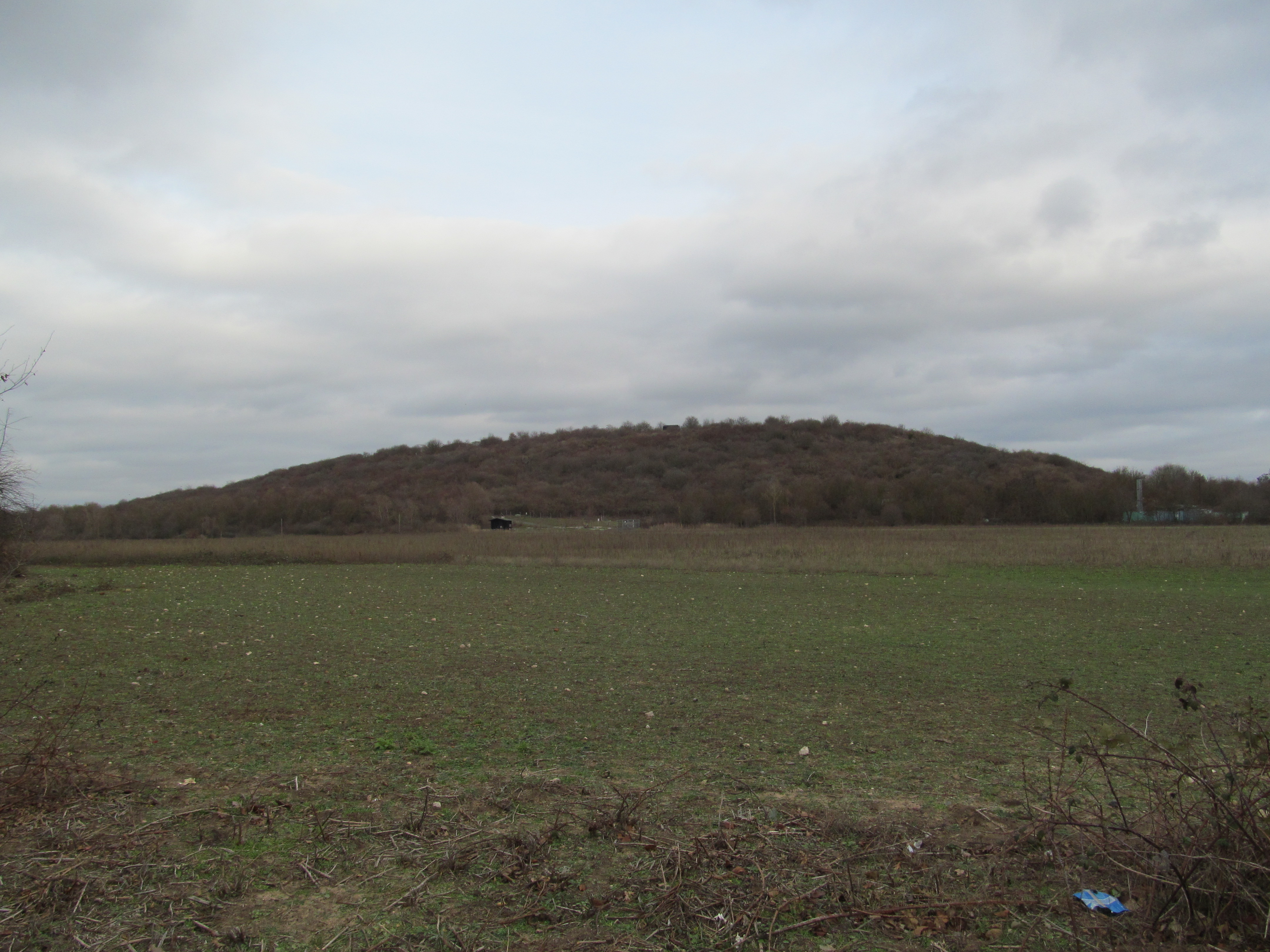
- Oberwaldberg, 2019.

Highest point
- Elevation: 145 m (476 ft)

Geography
- Location: Hesse, Germany

Oberwaldberg is a mountain of Hesse, Germany.
