= Stupferich =

District of Karlsruhe

- Borough of Karlsruhe
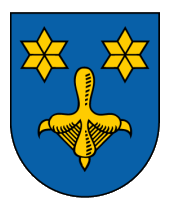
- Coat of arms

- Location of Stupferich within Karlsruhe
- Interactive map of Stupferich
- Location within Germany Location within Baden-Württemberg
- Coordinates: 48°57′N 8°30′E
- Country: Germany
- State: Baden-Württemberg
- District: Urban district
- City: Karlsruhe

Area
  - Total: 6.4999 km^{2} (2.5096 sq mi)
- Elevation: 215 m (705 ft)

Population (2020-12-31)
  - Total: 2,975
  - Density: 457.7/km^{2} (1,185/sq mi)
- Time zone: UTC+01:00 (CET)
  - Summer (DST): UTC+02:00 (CEST)
- Postal codes: 76228
- Dialling codes: 0721

Stupferich is a district of Karlsruhe. The high-altitude district is one of the Bergdörfer (mountain villages) of Karlsruhe and is located about 100 meters above the city center in the hilly landscape on the southeastern edge of the city area. In terms of natural geography, it belongs to the southern Kraichgau and has been part of the Central/North Black Forest Nature Park since January 2021.

== History ==
The first documented mention as Stutpferrich in a copy of the Codex Hirsaugiensis dates back to the year 1100. The name suggests that the place was originally built for horse breeding.

An alleged castle called Burg Stupferich, which is said to have been located south of the village, can no longer be proven today.

In 1972 Stupferich was incorporated into Karlsruhe.
