= Grünwettersbach =

District of Karlsruhe

- Borough of Karlsruhe
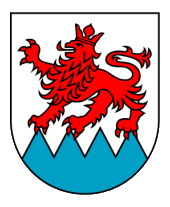
- Coat of arms

- Location of Grünwettersbach within Karlsruhe
- Interactive map of Grünwettersbach
- Location within Germany Location within Baden-Württemberg
- Coordinates: 48°57′N 8°27′E
- Country: Germany
- State: Baden-Württemberg
- District: Urban district
- City: Karlsruhe

Area
  - Total: 6.0409 km^{2} (2.3324 sq mi)
- Elevation: 211 m (692 ft)

Population (2021-10-01)
  - Total: 4,048
  - Density: 670.1/km^{2} (1,736/sq mi)
- Time zone: UTC+01:00 (CET)
  - Summer (DST): UTC+02:00 (CEST)
- Postal codes: 76228
- Dialling codes: 0721

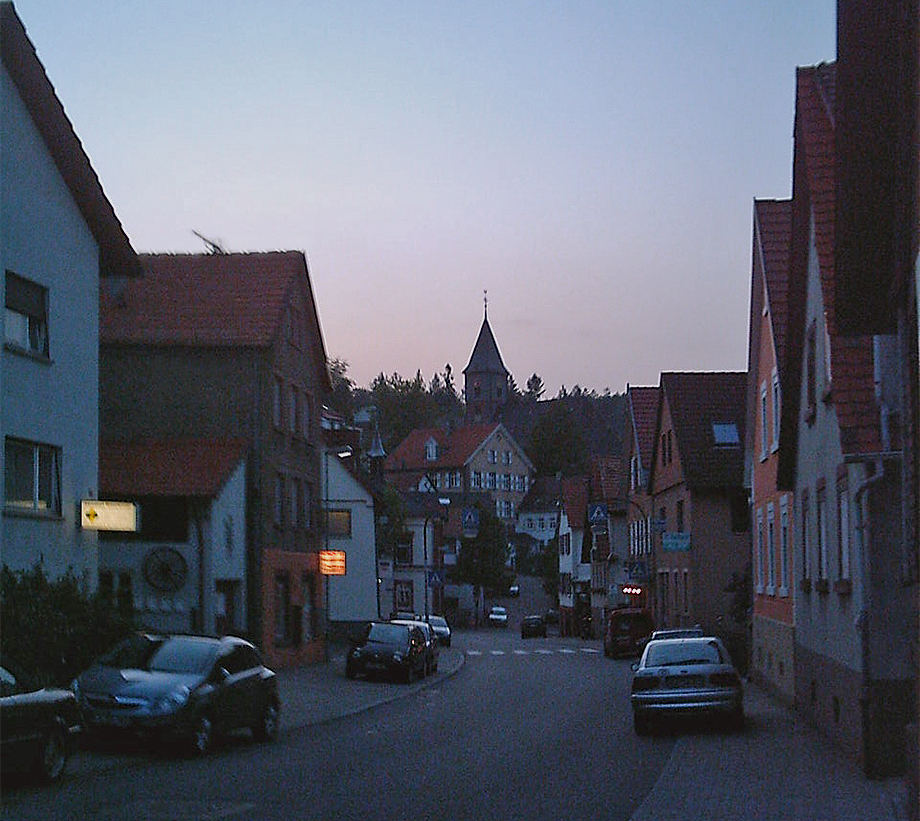
Main street with a view towards Kirchstaig and Alte Schule (Kirchstaig, corner of Am Steinhäusle)

Since its incorporation in 1975, Grünwettersbach has been a district in the southeast of Karlsruhe. Together with Palmbach (located further southeast), Grünwettersbach forms the administrative unit Wettersbach. Grünwettersbach is naturally located in the northern Black Forest and has been part of the Central/North Black Forest Nature Park since January 2021. It can be reached via the Karlsbad junction on the Bundesautobahn 8 between Karlsruhe and Pforzheim.

== History ==
The place was probably founded by the monks of the Herrenalb Abbey (Calw district). The Evangelical Parish Church of St. Lucia was first mentioned in 1278. The former patrons included the Counts of Vaihingen, whose coat of arms led the town until it was incorporated. Count Konrad V. von Vaihingen and his brother Johann sold the Teutonic Order Master Wolfram von Nellenburg "alle Güter zu ... Grünwettersbach samt dem Patronatsrecht und dem Zehnten" ("all goods to ... Grünwettersbach including the right of patronage and the tithe").

The village appeared in the local chronicle under the name "Wedersbach" or "Weddersbach". This name refers to the stream that flows through the town and is said to have belonged to a "Weter" or "Withar".

The monastery was under the patronage of Württemberg. With the introduction of the Reformation by Ulrich von Württemberg, the monastery was dissolved around 1535. Ulrich took over the area of the Alb-Pfinz plateau and thus owned a Protestant and Württemberg corridor through the area of the former Margraviate of Baden. Their heirs protested and one of them, Bernhard III, obtained an imperial mandate against the seizure and ensured that the parish was once again occupied by Catholics. From 1549 onwards, however, only Protestant pastors followed.

During the Thirty Years' War the town was badly affected by Croatian and Swedish troops around 1640 and is said to have been as completely depopulated every year as Mutschelbach. In 1689 it was looted and burned again by the troops of General Ezéchiel de Mélac. In 1697 at the latest, a blacksmith's shop, the oldest surviving building in the town, was built. It is located at Hauptstrasse 38 and contains the year on the top door bar. In 1701, Eberhard Louis, Duke of Württemberg settled 28 Waldensian families in the Grünwettersbach area.

In 1806 the place came to the Grand Duchy of Baden via the Tausch- und Epurationsvertrag (exchange and epuration agreement).

The current town hall from 1881 was formerly the headquarters of the fire department, police and prison. Today it houses the administration, the residents' registration office, the building authority, the office for citizens' services and the mayor's office. Grünwettersbach has 70 hectares of green space.

In order to prevent an incorporation into Karlsruhe, Grünwettersbach and Palmbach merged on January 1, 1972, to form the municipality of Wettersbach, named after the Wettersbach river that runs through both towns. Despite that, on January 1, 1975, Wettersbach was incorporated into Karlsruhe. Both districts were given their original names back.

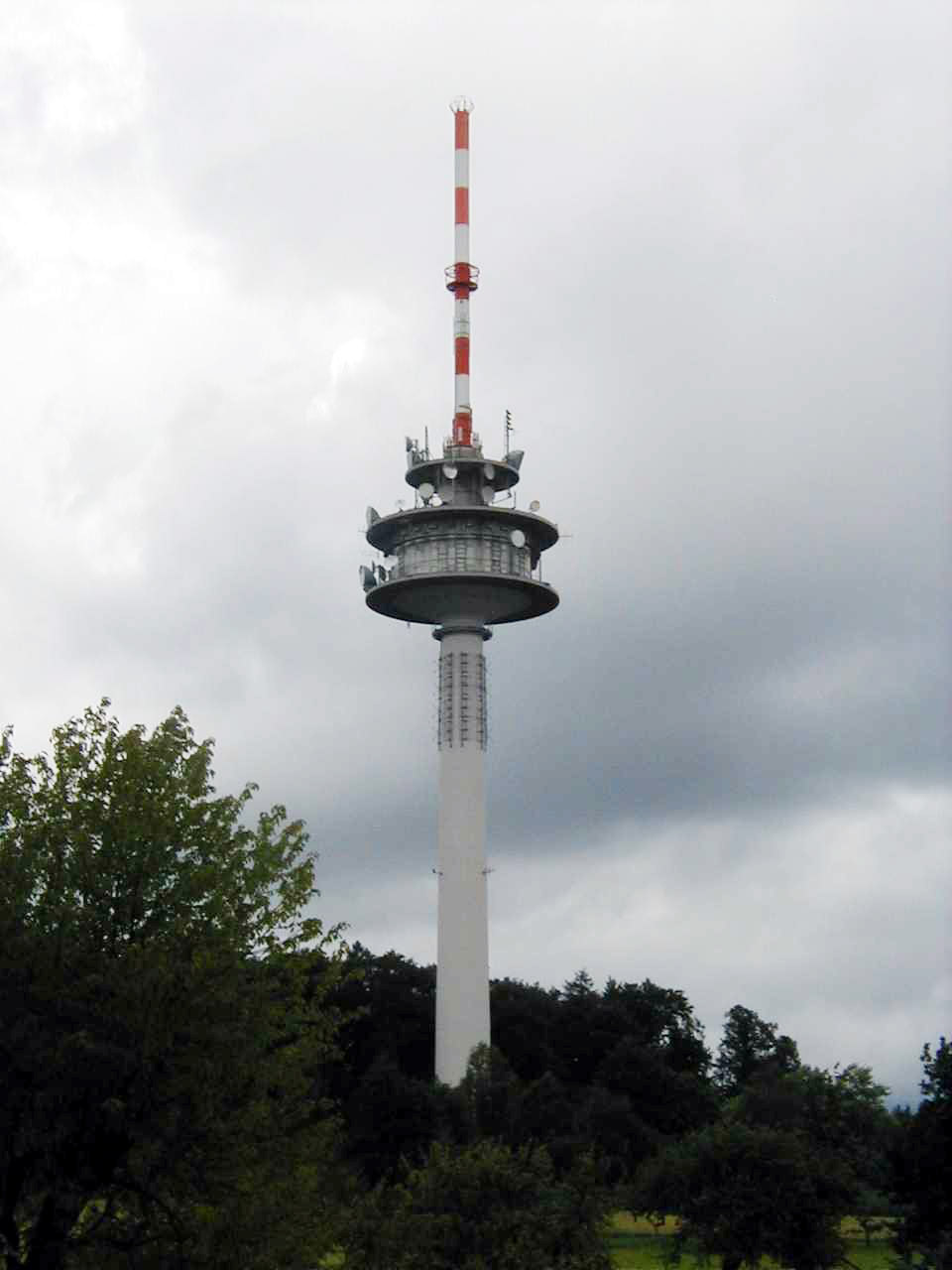
Fernmeldeturm Grünwettersbach

== Transportation ==
Grünwettersbach is connected to the Karlsruher Verkehrsverbund network. During rush hour there is a bus connection with lines 47 and 47A every 10 minutes to Zündhütle (tram stop) or every 20 minutes to Karlsruhe Central Station. There is also a bus connection to Durlach with line 27. Since December 2018, there have been new bus connections to the neighboring Landkreis Karlsruhe from Monday to Friday: bus line 158 to Langensteinbach to the Langensteinbach train station there and to the SRH clinic. The school bus also goes to the Langensteinbach school center.

== Tourist attractions ==
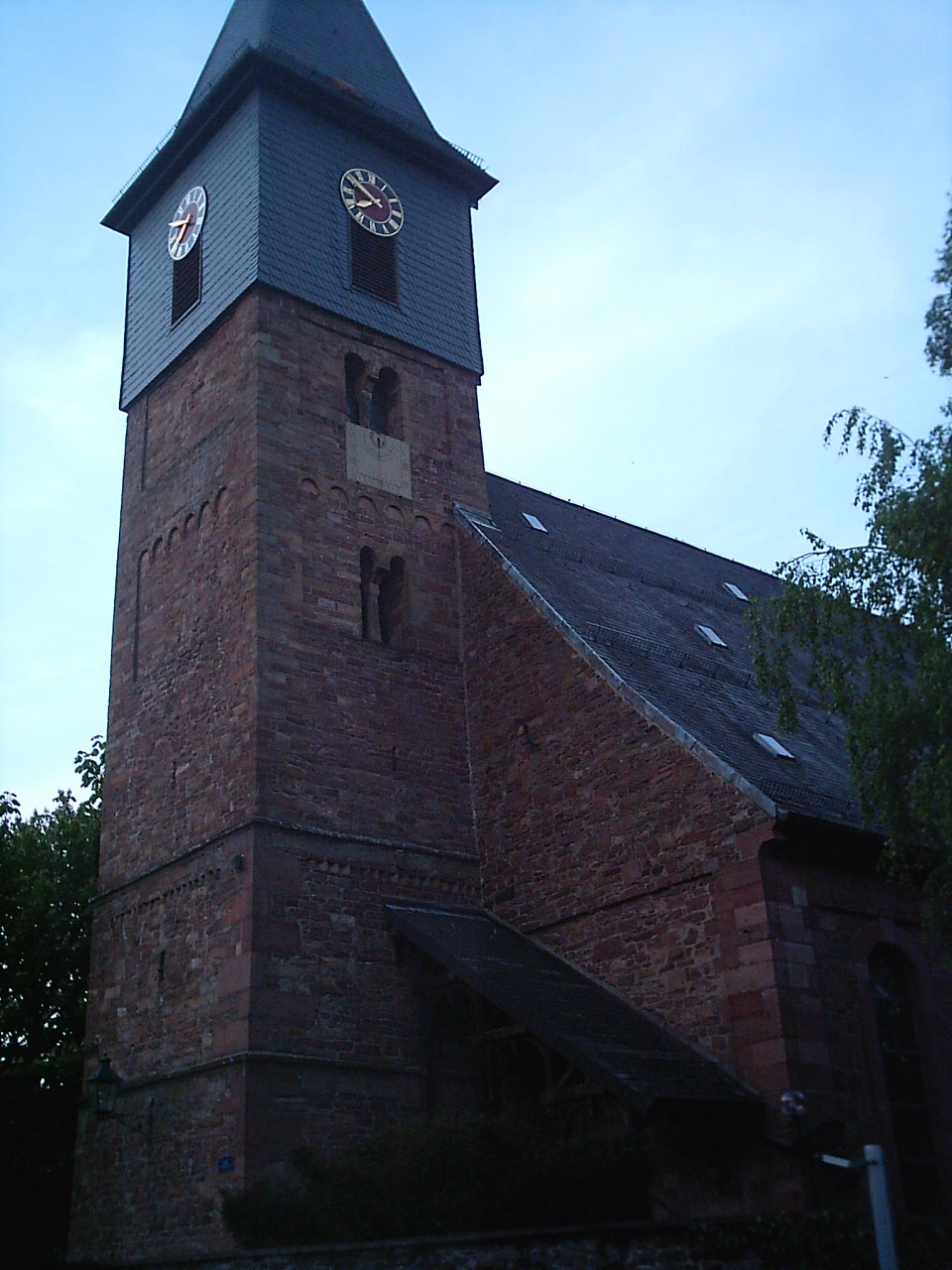
Evangelical Parish Church of St. Lucia

The oldest structure in the village is the romanesque church tower of the parish church of St. Lucia, which dates from the 12th or 13th century. The nave of the church was renovated in 1781–82 by church council builder Wilhelm Friedrich Goez from Ludwigsburg.

In the course of the introduction of the Reformation in the town, the parish church became Protestant.

The place is known for the 144 meter high Fernmeldeturm Grünwettersbach, which is visible in large parts of the region. The tower is a "FMT 2" Typenturm.

== Notable people ==
- Wilhelm Claupein (1956–2023), Professor of crop production at the University of Hohenheim
