= Alb (Upper Rhine) =

River in Germany

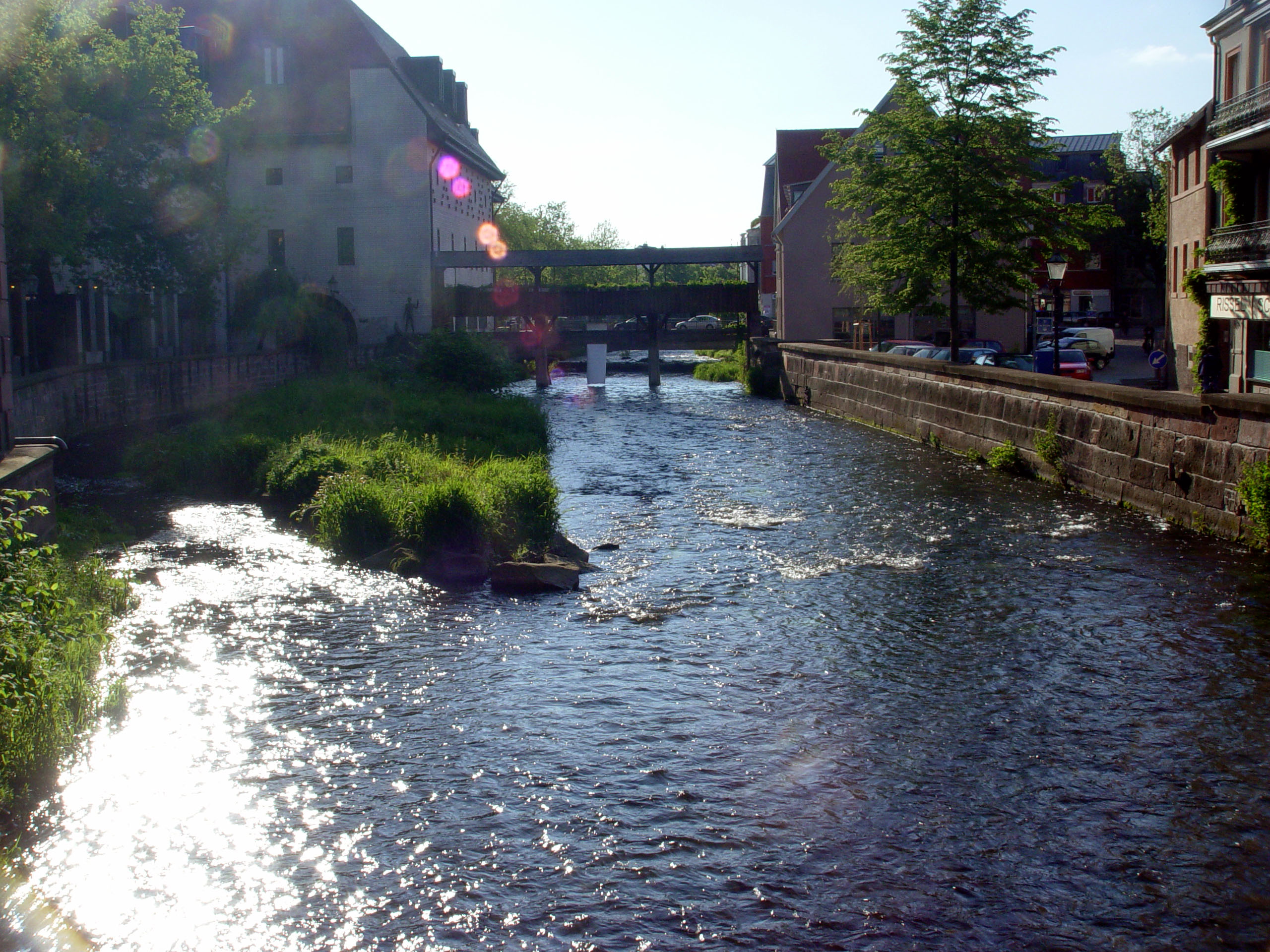
- The Alb in Ettlingen

- Location of mouth

Location
- Country: Germany

Physical characteristics
- Source
  - location: South of Bad Herrenalb
  - coordinates: 48°45′0″N 8°25′22″E
  - elevation: 751 m (2,464 ft)
- Mouth
  - location: into the Upper Rhine at Eggenstein-Leopoldshafen
  - coordinates: 49°6′28″N 8°21′48″E
  - elevation: 101 m (331 ft)
- Length: 51.5 km (32 mi)
- Basin size: 448 km^{2} (173 sq mi)
- Discharge
  - average: 2.5 m^{3}/s (88 cu ft/s)

Basin features
- Progression: Rhine→ North Sea
- Tributaries
  - left: Moosalb
  - right: Maisenbach

The Alb (German pronunciation: [alp]) is a river in the Northern Black Forest in Germany. It is a tributary of the Rhine, and flows through the cities of Karlsruhe, Ettlingen and Bad Herrenalb.

== Geography ==
The river Alb begins about 7 kilometres (4 mi) from Bad Herrenalb. From its source it flows north through Bad Herrenalb, Frauenalb and Marxzell. There it takes the waters of the Maisenbach creek as a right tributary. The river Moosalb is a left tributary at Fischweier on the border between the municipalities of Marxzell and Karlsbad. Near Busenbach the Alb turns to the northwest.

Out of Ettlingen, the Alb leaves the Black Forest and reaches the Upper Rhine Plain. After flowing through Ettlingen it turns north again.

The river passes the Karlsruhe city district of Rüppurr, flows under the Federal Road no. 10 and then follows this highway to the northwest. Afterwards the Alb flows through the so-called Günther Klotz Facilities in the southern part of Karlsruhe – partially being the district border between Bulach and Beiertheim – and thereby forms the core of a popular local recreation area. The Karlsruhe district of Daxlanden is then passed through in a great loop and the river reaches the Appenmühle barrage where the Karlsruhe city works operate a hydroelectric power station since the year 2000. After that the Alb flows around the ports at the river Rhine in Mühlburg. In Knielingen, the river turns north-northeast, approximately parallel to the Rhine, and flows through the MiRO oil refinery in a canal.

Eventually the Alb reaches the floodplains of the Rhine at Eggenstein-Leopoldshafen and discharges into the Rhine. Shortly before emptying into the Rhine, it is joined to the right side by the relief canal of the river Pfinz.

== Literature ==
- Landesanstalt für Umweltschutz Baden-Württemberg (LfU), ed. (2005). Das Albtal. Natur und Kultur vom Schwarzwald bis zum Rhein (in German). Ubstadt-Weiher: Verlag Regionalkultur. ISBN 978-3-89735-279-7.
- Scheifele, Max (1993). Die Flößerei auf der Ettlinger Alb. Aus der Geschichte des Albtales (in German). Gernsbach: Katz. ISBN 3-925825-60-6.
- Bran, F. A. (1951). Ettlingen und der Albgau im Wandel der Geschichte. Rundgang durch die Stadt, den Bezirk und das Albgau-Museum (in German). Karlsruhe: Verlag G. Braun.
- Kirchenbauer, S.; Warda, R. (2001). Die Alb: Ein Fluß im Wechselspiel zwischen Mensch und Natur (in German). Karlsruhe: Badenia Verlag. ISBN 978-3-89735-357-2.

== See also ==
- List of rivers of Baden-Württemberg
