= Innenstadt-Ost (Karlsruhe) =

District of Karlsruhe

- Borough of Karlsruhe
- Coat of arms

- Location of Innenstadt-Ost within Karlsruhe
- Interactive map of Innenstadt-Ost
- Location within Germany Location within Baden-Württemberg
- Coordinates: 49°1′N 8°25′E
- Country: Germany
- State: Baden-Württemberg
- District: Urban district
- City: Karlsruhe

Area
  - Total: 1.5985 km^{2} (0.6172 sq mi)

Population (2023-12-31)
  - Total: 6,422
  - Density: 4,018/km^{2} (10,410/sq mi)
- Time zone: UTC+01:00 (CET)
  - Summer (DST): UTC+02:00 (CEST)
- Postal codes: 76131, 76133
- Dialling codes: 0721

Innenstadt-Ost is a district in the eastern center of Karlsruhe, Germany. The district, along with Innenstadt-West, forms the city center. Innenstadt-Ost is the oldest district of Karlsruhe and is located in the area of the former Klein-Karlsruhe, a village from which the city of Karlsruhe later developed.

Famous buildings located in Innenstadt-Ost are the Karlsruhe Institute of Technology and the Wildparkstadion.
