= Grünwinkel =

District of Karlsruhe, Germany

- Borough of Karlsruhe
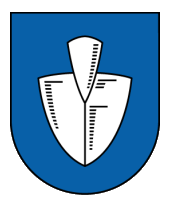
- Coat of arms

- Location of Grünwinkel within Karlsruhe
- Interactive map of Grünwinkel
- Location within Germany Location within Baden-Württemberg
- Coordinates: 49°0′N 8°21′E
- Country: Germany
- State: Baden-Württemberg
- District: Urban district
- City: Karlsruhe

Area
  - Total: 4.41 km^{2} (1.70 sq mi)

Population (2020-12-31)
  - Total: 10,722
  - Density: 2,430/km^{2} (6,300/sq mi)
- Time zone: UTC+01:00 (CET)
  - Summer (DST): UTC+02:00 (CEST)
- Postal codes: 76185, 76189
- Dialling codes: 0721

Grünwinkel is a district in the southwest of Karlsruhe, Germany.

The district is further divided into Alt-Grünwinkel, Hardecksiedlung, Albsiedlung, Alte Heidenstückersiedlung and Neue Heidenstückersiedlung.

== History ==
There are archeological traces of a brickyard from the 1st century. Written information dates from the 15th century, when the name was Kreenwinkel, which can be read as crow corner. Today's name means green corner.
