= Marxzell =

- Municipality
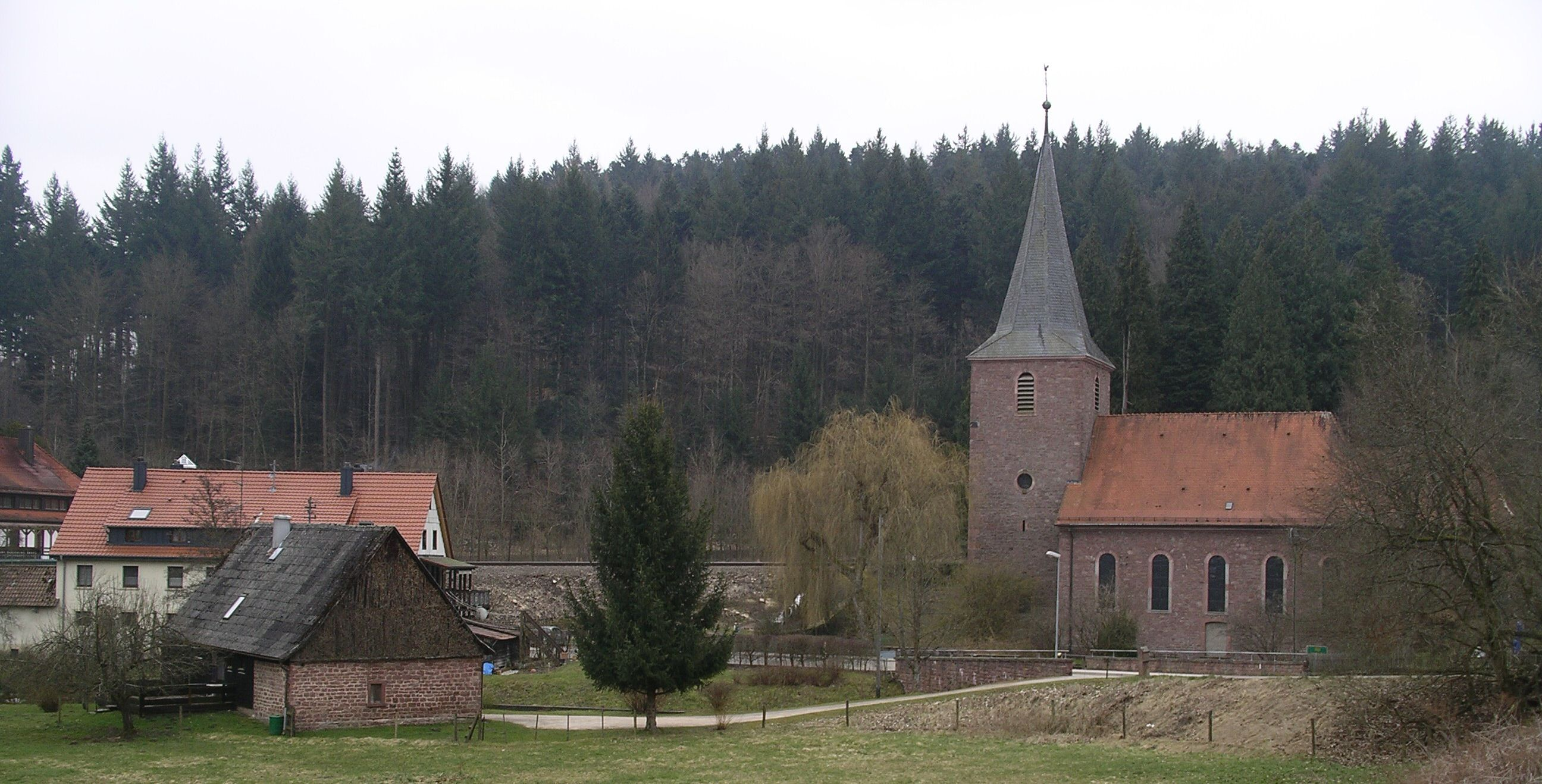
- Church in Marxzell

- Coat of arms

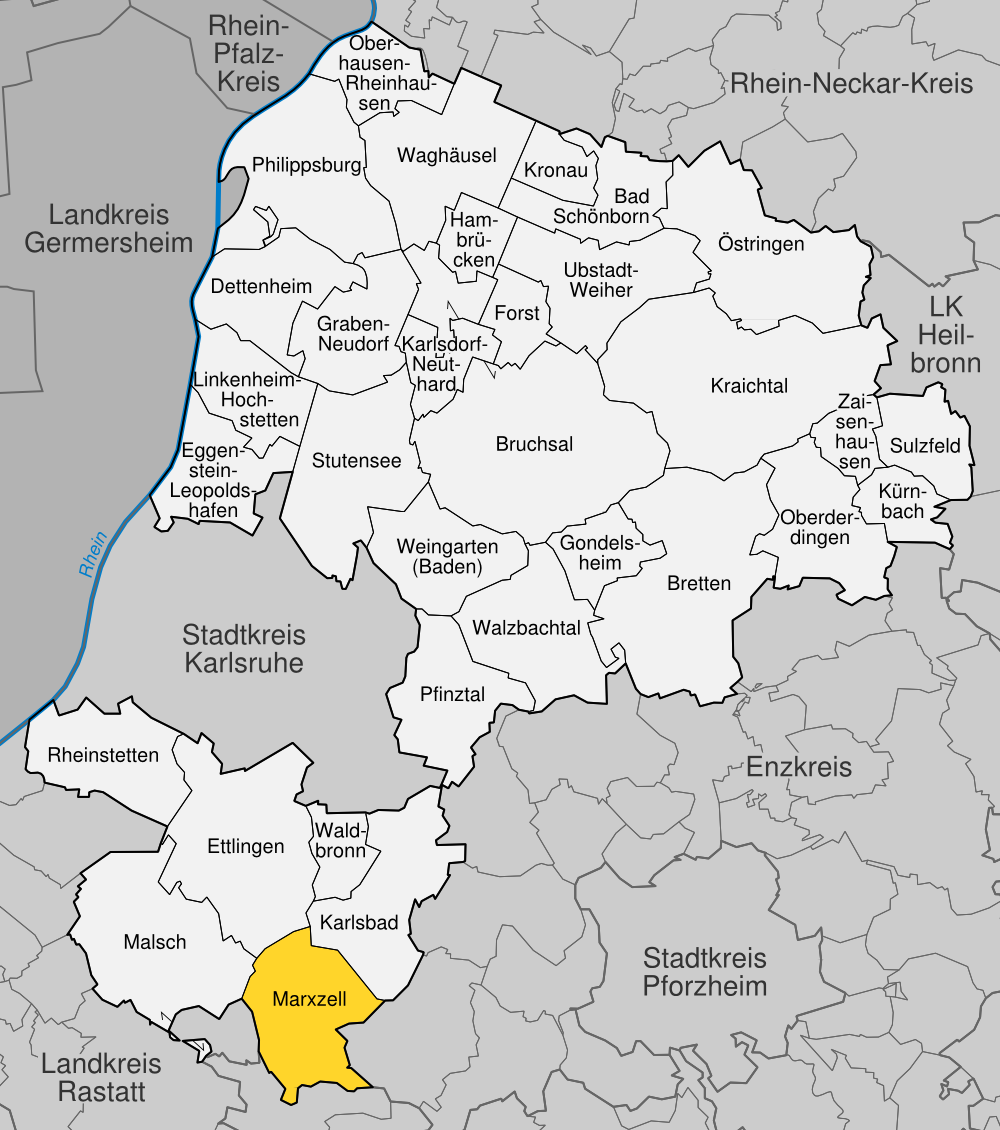
- Location of Marxzell within Karlsruhe district
- Interactive map of Marxzell
- Location within Germany Location within Baden-Württemberg
- Coordinates: 48°51′38″N 8°27′34″E
- Country: Germany
- State: Baden-Württemberg
- Admin. region: Karlsruhe
- District: Karlsruhe
- Subdivisions: 7

Government
  - Mayor (2023–31): Sabrina Eisele

Area
  - Total: 34.92 km^{2} (13.48 sq mi)
- Elevation: 364 m (1,194 ft)

Population (2025-12-31)
  - Total: 4,978
  - Density: 142.6/km^{2} (369.2/sq mi)
- Time zone: UTC+01:00 (CET)
  - Summer (DST): UTC+02:00 (CEST)
- Postal codes: 76359
- Dialling codes: 07248
- Vehicle registration: KA
- Website: www.marxzell.de

Marxzell (German pronunciation: [ˈmaʁksˌtsɛl]) is a municipality in the district of Karlsruhe in Baden-Württemberg in Germany.

== Geography ==
Marxzell is located on the Alb (Albtal) and on the heights of the North Black Forest (German Nordschwarzwald).

Marxzell is an amalgamation of seven subdivisions: Marxzell in the Albtal and Burbach; Pfaffenrot and Schielberg on the surrounding heights of the Black Forest; and Weiler Fischweier, Steinhäusle and Frauenalb in the valley.

== History ==
Marxzell was first mentioned in historical records in 1255. During this time a monastery existed at Frauenalb and had power over the town. After the Reformation and the subsequent country division, Marxzell in 1535 was located on the line division with a split government. When the monastery was repaired in 1631, it recovered the domination or power over the town.

In 1803 as consequence of German Mediatisation (German Reichsdeputationshauptschluss), the monastery was removed of all its power, and Marxzell came under rule of Grand Duke of Baden. There it was first ruled by the Margrave, Elector and Grand Duke of Ettlingen and since 1937 by the County of Karlsruhe.

English playwright Terence Rattigan based his 1936 play French Without Tears on his 1933 visit to the village.

== Demographics ==
Population development:

Year	Inhabitants
1990	5,062
2001	5,521
2011	4,974
2021	4,949

== Politics ==
=== Local Council ===
The local election on 26 May 2019 brought the following result:

Municipal Council 2019
Party / Liste	Votes (Gain from 2014)	Seats
Freie Wähler	54,2 % (−17,7)	11 (−2)
Marxzellplus	21,3 % (+21,3)	4 (+4)
CDU	20,4 % (−7,7)	4 (−1)
FDP/Liberale Liste	4,1 % (+4,1)	1 (+1)
Voter participation: 66,9 % (+11,4)

== Transport ==
Marxzell is connected to the city of Karlsruhe and the town of Bad Herrenalb by the S1 branch of the Albtalbahn, an electric railway that forms part of the Karlsruhe Stadtbahn.

Burbach, Pfaffenrot and Schielberg are connected with a bus service to the train station Marxzell. The bus service have the line number 114.

== Personalities ==
=== Notable residents ===
- Prälat Heinz Axtmann (died 2016)
- Otto Baldinus
- Pfarrer Heinrich Hall (died 1983)
- Pfarrer Emil Krämer (died 1987)
- Friedrich Fauser (died 1988)
- Bürgermeister Max Brandel (died 1988)
- Bürgermeister Ignaz Weingärtner (died 1995)
- Emil Kunz (died 2003)
- Ortsvorsteher Otto Fluderer (died 2004)

Sons and daughters of the community

- Franz Boos (1753–1832)
- Adolf Franz Samwer (1895–1958)
- Egon Schallmayer (born 1951)
