= Nordweststadt (Karlsruhe) =

Borough of Karlsruhe

- Borough of Karlsruhe
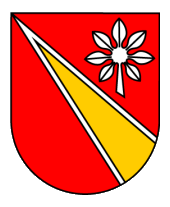
- Coat of arms
- Interactive map of Nordweststadt
- Location within Germany Location within Baden-Württemberg
- Coordinates: 49°2′N 8°22′E
- Country: Germany
- State: Baden-Württemberg
- District: Urban district
- City: Karlsruhe

Area
  - Total: 3.759 km^{2} (1.451 sq mi)

Population (2014-06-30)
  - Total: 11,323
  - Density: 3,012/km^{2} (7,802/sq mi)
- Time zone: UTC+01:00 (CET)
  - Summer (DST): UTC+02:00 (CEST)
- Dialling codes: 0721

Nordweststadt is a borough of Karlsruhe. The borough is best known for the Karlsruhe Municipal Hospital and other municipal authorities.

The district is further divided into Alter Flugplatz, Binsenschlauch, Lange Richtstatt and Rennbuckel.

== History ==
The development began with the Karlsruhe Municipal Hospital in 1907. This was followed by several barracks. Their extensive facilities are now used commercially by the Karlsruhe Institute of Technology (west university, Akaflieg), a government center, the Egon von Neindorff Riding Institute and new buildings by the Federal Institute for Hydraulic Engineering.

To the north there are residential areas that emerged later. On a lower strip of land, a former side channel of the Rhine, there are gardens and sports facilities, including the disused Karlsruher FV stadium. At the north end are the locations of the Baden-Württemberg State Institute for the Environment, the cosmetics manufacturer L'Oréal and the educational academy of the Handwerkskammer Karlsruhe. To the east lies the Alter Flugplatz nature reserve.
