= Südweststadt =

District of Karlsruhe, Germany

- Borough of Karlsruhe
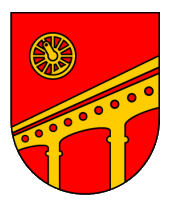
- Coat of arms

- Location of Südweststadt within Karlsruhe
- Interactive map of Südweststadt
- Location within Germany Location within Baden-Württemberg
- Coordinates: 49°0′N 8°24′E
- Country: Germany
- State: Baden-Württemberg
- District: Urban district
- City: Karlsruhe

Area
  - Total: 2.97 km^{2} (1.15 sq mi)

Population (2014-06-30)
  - Total: 19,981
  - Density: 6,730/km^{2} (17,400/sq mi)
- Time zone: UTC+01:00 (CET)
  - Summer (DST): UTC+02:00 (CEST)
- Postal codes: 76133, 76135, 76137
- Dialling codes: 0721

Südweststadt is a borough in Karlsruhe, Germany, located between Kriegsstraße and the main train station and west of the Karlsruhe Zoo.

The district is further divided into Östlicher Teil, Mittlerer Teil and Beiertheimer Feld.

== History ==
The area of today's Südweststadt used to belong to Beiertheim. It was only when industry settled in Südweststadt and construction work began in 1860 that the area became a separate district. The Karlsruhe Zoo was built at the eastern end in 1864.

Originally designated as an industrial area, it is now mainly a residential area without large factories. The Industriewerke Karlsruhe, a weapons and munitions factory built during the World War II, is now used by, among others, the Zentrum für Kunst und Medien. The district is also home to the Public Prosecutor General, the Günther-Klotz-Anlage park, the hospital St. Vincentius-Kliniken and the Europahalle.
