= Oberreut =

District of Karlsruhe

- Borough of Karlsruhe
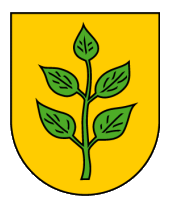
- Coat of arms

- Location of Oberreut within Karlsruhe
- Interactive map of Oberreut
- Location within Germany Location within Baden-Württemberg
- Coordinates: 48°59′N 8°21′E
- Country: Germany
- State: Baden-Württemberg
- District: Urban district
- City: Karlsruhe

Area
  - Total: 2.4221 km^{2} (0.9352 sq mi)

Population (2018-12-31)
  - Total: 9,563
  - Density: 3,948/km^{2} (10,230/sq mi)
- Time zone: UTC+01:00 (CET)
  - Summer (DST): UTC+02:00 (CEST)
- Dialling codes: 0721

Oberreut is a district in the south of Karlsruhe. The town is located around 2.5 kilometers southwest of the city center of Karlsruhe and south of the Bundesstraße 10.

== History ==
Oberreut was originally planned and built as a planned community to combat the housing shortage and is considered one of the poorer districts of Karlsruhe due to the poor social and infrastructure conditions.

The first houses in Oberreut were occupied in the summer of 1964. The place was created in the Bulach district according to the general functional zoning plan drawn up in 1926, also known as the "Schneider Plan".

A residential area for around 12,000 people was built on the drawing board on an area of 100 hectares. In 1970, development in the forest area was completed. 5,700 residents, instead of the planned 4,200, lived in the 1,160 apartments created. The field location was then planned.

The partial development plan "Oberreut-Feldlage I" was passed as a statute in 1969. 439 residential units for 1,500 people were created. In 1980 the "Oberreut-Feldlage II" development plan was added. "Oberreut-Feldlage III" followed in 1990.

On June 30, 1999, 9,956 people (9,817 of whom had their main residence) lived in 4,231 apartments in Oberreut, roughly the same as today.
