= Knielingen =

District of Karlsruhe

- Borough of Karlsruhe
- Coat of arms

- Location of Knielingen within Karlsruhe
- Interactive map of Knielingen
- Location within Germany Location within Baden-Württemberg
- Coordinates: 49°2′N 8°21′E
- Country: Germany
- State: Baden-Württemberg
- District: Urban district
- City: Karlsruhe

Area
  - Total: 20.6428 km^{2} (7.9702 sq mi)
- Elevation: 113 m (371 ft)

Population (2017-03-31)
  - Total: 10,223
  - Density: 495.23/km^{2} (1,282.6/sq mi)
- Time zone: UTC+01:00 (CET)
  - Summer (DST): UTC+02:00 (CEST)
- Dialling codes: 0721

Knielingen is a district in the northwest of Karlsruhe, Germany, on the Rhine and is the oldest documented district and, with around 2,000 hectares, the second largest district in terms of area, after Durlach.

The district is further divided into Alt-Knielingen and Neu-Knielingen.

== History ==
In 786 Knielingen was first mentioned as Cnutlinga in the Lorsch codex. However, the entry in the codex is contradictory, so that it may be 776. Excavation finds point to settlement as early as the Bronze Age. A cremation burial ground with 44 known burials dates back to Roman times.

The history of Knielingen has always been strongly influenced by the Rhine. Johann Gottfried Tulla's straightening of the Rhine from 1817 led to the loss of areas that are now on the left bank of the Rhine. On April 1, 1935, Knielingen became part of the city of Karlsruhe.

After the Second World War, the district gained greater importance as an industrial location. One of the largest Siemens locations in Germany was founded here in 1950. The Karlsruhe refineries went into operation on the Rhine in 1962. In addition, the Siemens location in Knielingen developed into the Siemens Industrial Park Karlsruhe in 1997 with numerous companies from the technology sector.

After the war, American soldiers were stationed on the barracks in the district; they were withdrawn after German reunification. A new development area has been created on the barracks site, most of which has been completed.

Since 1980, part of the lake in Knielingen has formed the Altrhein Maxau nature reserve. The Burgau is another nature reserve in Knielingen.

Knielingen has a black "Drudenfuß" (Pentagram) in its coat of arms. The coat of arms colors black and gold were adopted by the Knielingen local council in 1895 at the suggestion of the general state archives.

== Infrastructure ==
Karlsruhe's only Rhine bridges are located in the Knielingen area. They connect the city with the state of Rhineland-Palatinate by road and rail. The Südtangente, a large bypass road, runs through Knielingen and ends at the Rhine bridge. Knielingen is connected to the local public transport network by tram line 2, the light rail line S5, the Winden–Karlsruhe railway line (Bahnhof Karlsruhe-Knielingen train station) and bus lines 74 and 75.

=== Horse racing track ===
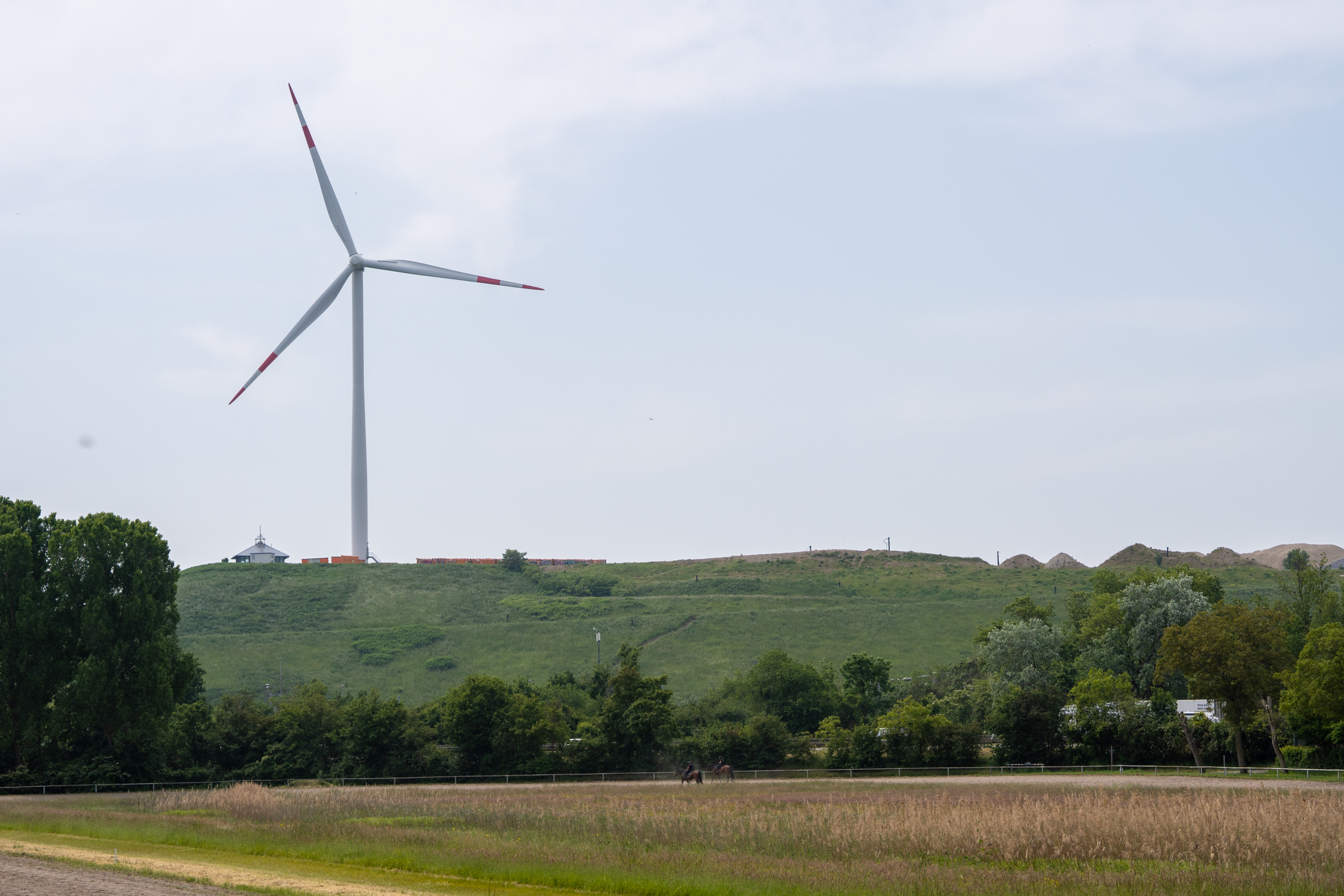
The Windmühlenberg (former landfill), in front of it is the Knielingen horse racing track

The horse breeding and racing club Zucht- und Rennverein Karlsruhe-Knielingen operates a horse racing track in Knielingen, which is located in the Burgau nature reserve. Trotting and galloping races are held on the sand track. There are also several buildings for catering, for parimutuel betting operations, and a covered grandstand. On the standing wall one can see the track from an elevated position.

=== Knielingen 2.0 ===
When the American armed forces withdrew from the barracks on Sudetenstraße after the end of the Cold War, a 30-hectare area in the north of Knielingen became available, which has been gradually being built on since around 2009. The site is primarily being developed with rental or condominiums and terraced houses. A commercial area is also being created, including a local supply center with a large supermarket, which opened in 2009. The project is intended to provide living space for up to 2,000 people and is referred to as "Knielingen 2.0". Tram line 2 has also been running there since November 2020.

== Notable people ==
- Christoph Drollinger (1861–1943), Protestant clergyman and founder of the Christian Swiss Community "Schweizer Gemeinde für Urchristentum"
