= Nordstadt (Karlsruhe) =

District of Karlsruhe, Germany

- Borough of Karlsruhe
- Coat of arms

- Location of Nordstadt within Karlsruhe
- Interactive map of Nordstadt
- Location within Germany Location within Baden-Württemberg
- Coordinates: 49°01′30″N 08°23′24″E
- Country: Germany
- State: Baden-Württemberg
- District: Urban district
- City: Karlsruhe

Area
  - Total: 2.6731 km^{2} (1.0321 sq mi)

Population (2020-12-31)
  - Total: 9,301
  - Density: 3,479/km^{2} (9,012/sq mi)
- Time zone: UTC+01:00 (CET)
  - Summer (DST): UTC+02:00 (CEST)
- Postal codes: 76131, 76185
- Dialling codes: 0721

The Nordstadt (German pronunciation: [ˈnɔʁtˌʃtat], lit. 'North City') is a district of Karlsruhe, Germany. It is the newest district and was founded on January 1, 1996.

The district is further divided into Hardtwaldsiedlung and Amerikanersiedlung.

== History ==
Besides areas that used to be part of the Weststadt-borough (Hardtwaldsiedlung a housing cooperative, founded in the 1920s), large parts of today's borough consist of the former United States Army Smiley Barracks (Originally built in 1937 as the Forstner-Kaserne) and the American Paul Revere Village housing area (founded in 1951). For that reason most streets, in what used to be Paul Revere Village, still carry the name of U.S. states. After the US forces left Karlsruhe in 1995 new apartment building were erected and existing apartment buildings renovated with storeys being added.

The newly constructed Smiley West housing estate (nickname "Legoland") was built adjacent to the former Smiley Barracks.

== Facilities ==
=== Education ===
The former Karlsruhe American Elementary School is now home of the Maryland Grundschule and the former Karlsruhe American High School to an independent school, the Heisenberg-Gymnasium. In 1995 the Duale Hochschule Baden-Württemberg Karlsruhe moved to an area close to the former airfield.

=== Religious ===
The catholic Herz-Jesu-Church, originally founded in 1924 as a temporary structure, is located south of the Hardtwaldsiedlung housing cooperative.

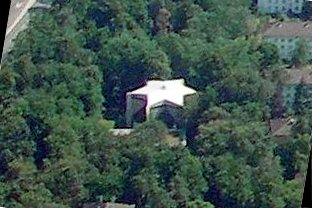
Aerial image Karlsruhe Synagogue

The Synagogue of Karlsruhe, newly constructed in 1971, is situated in Nordstadt.

The former North Chapel of Paul Revere Village was home to several congregations. From 1996-2011, operated jointly by the Protestant and Catholic Church, the building was used as the Maria Magdalena Ecumenical Community Centre (Ökumenisches Gemeindezentrum Maria Magdalena) and also home to the pentecostal All Christian Believers Fellowship. Since 2012 the building is owned by the Serbian Orthodox Church (Hram Svete Petke - Congregation).

=== Sports ===
Using the facilities left behind by the US forces, the Nordstadt is home to the Karlsruhe Cougars Baseball team.
