= Mühlburg =

District of Karlsruhe, Germany

- Borough of Karlsruhe
- Coat of arms

- Location of Mühlburg within Karlsruhe
- Interactive map of Mühlburg
- Location within Germany Location within Baden-Württemberg
- Coordinates: 49°00′51.23″N 08°21′9.29″E
- Country: Germany
- State: Baden-Württemberg
- District: Urban district
- City: Karlsruhe

Area
  - Total: 5.2641 km^{2} (2.0325 sq mi)

Population (2020-12-31)
  - Total: 16,420
  - Density: 3,119/km^{2} (8,079/sq mi)
- Time zone: UTC+01:00 (CET)
  - Summer (DST): UTC+02:00 (CEST)
- Postal codes: 76185
- Dialling codes: 0721

Mühlburg is a district of Karlsruhe, Germany.

The district is further divided into Alt-Mühlburg, Weingärtensiedlung, Rheinhafen and Mühlburger Feld.

== History ==
Mühlburg was first mentioned in 1248, when it was referred to as Mulenberc. In 1258 there was the first mention of a castle owned by Rudolf I, Margrave of Baden. The name could be translated as "mill castle" and refers to a water mill and a water castle located at the site where a Roman road once crossed the small river Alb.

In 1274 Mühlburg was, like many neighbouring settlements, occupied by Rudolph of Habsburg.

In 1670 Mühlburg received town privileges and, just a few years before Karlsruhe, it was issued a "letter of freedom", which relaxed the requirements for craftsmen and new citizens to settle in the town.

It is believed that the Margraves of Baden planned to expand Mühlburg. Any such plans came to a halt in 1689, when Mühlburg and its castle were destroyed by French troops during the Nine Years' War following the orders of Louis XIV of France to destroy the margravate of Baden ("Ruinez les pays de Bade").

The castle was never rebuilt thereafter and the ruins of the castle were used as building material for a newly founded palace nearby, out of which the future city of Karlsruhe would develop.

Mühlburg finally became a borough of Karlsruhe in 1886.

== Notable people ==
Mühlburg is the birthplace of Karl Benz (1844–1929), inventor of the automobile and founder of Benz & Cie.

== Books ==
- Stadtarchiv Karlsruhe (City Archives) (1998). Mühlburg. Streifzüge durch die Ortsgeschichte. Karlsruhe: Info-Verlag. ISBN 3-88190-227-9.
