= Innenstadt-West (Karlsruhe) =

District of Karlsruhe

- Borough of Karlsruhe
- Coat of arms

- Location of Innenstadt-West within Karlsruhe
- Interactive map of Innenstadt-West
- Location within Germany Location within Baden-Württemberg
- Coordinates: 49°1′N 8°24′E
- Country: Germany
- State: Baden-Württemberg
- District: Urban district
- City: Karlsruhe

Area
  - Total: 2.4057 km^{2} (0.9288 sq mi)

Population (2023-12-31)
  - Total: 9,950
  - Density: 4,140/km^{2} (10,700/sq mi)
- Time zone: UTC+01:00 (CET)
  - Summer (DST): UTC+02:00 (CEST)
- Postal codes: 76131, 76133
- Dialling codes: 0721

Innenstadt-West is a district in the western center of Karlsruhe, Germany. The district, along with Innenstadt-Ost, forms the city center. This is where mainly service and business activities take place; while there are only 9,950 inhabitants in this district, there are over 25,000 jobs here.

Famous buildings located in Innenstadt-West are the Karlsruhe Palace and several of the highest courts in Germany, like the Federal Constitutional Court and the Federal Court of Justice.
