= Karlsruhe I (electoral district) =

State electoral district of Germany

27: Karlsruhe I
- Electoral district for the Landtag of Baden-Württemberg
- Karlsruhe I in 2026
- District: Karlsruhe
- Electorate: 102,394 (2026)
- Major settlements: Beiertheim-Bulach, Durlach, Grötzingen, Grünwettersbach, Hagsfeld, Hohenwettersbach, Innenstadt-Ost, Oststadt, Palmbach, Rintheim, Rüppurr, Stupferich, Südstadt, Waldstadt, Weiherfeld-Dammerstock, and Wolfartsweier

Current electoral district
- Party: Green
- Member: Ute Leidig

Karlsruhe I is an electoral constituency (German: Wahlkreis) represented in the Landtag of Baden-Württemberg.

Since 2026, it has elected one member via first-past-the-post voting. Voters cast a second vote under which additional seats are allocated proportionally state-wide. Under the constituency numbering system, it is designated as constituency 27.

It is wholly within the city of Karlsruhe.

== Geography ==
The constituency includes the districts of Beiertheim-Bulach, Durlach, Grötzingen, Grünwettersbach, Hagsfeld, Hohenwettersbach, Innenstadt-Ost, Oststadt, Palmbach, Rintheim, Rüppurr, Stupferich, Südstadt, Waldstadt, Weiherfeld-Dammerstock, and Wolfartsweier within the city of Karlsruhe.

There were 102,394 eligible voters in 2026.

== Members ==
=== First mandate ===
Both prior to and since the electoral reforms for the 2026 election, the winner of the plurality of the vote (first-past-the-post) in every constituency won the first mandate.

Election	Member	Party	%
1976	Traugott Bender	CDU	
Feb 1979	Eugen Volz	CDU	
1980	Eugen Volz	CDU	
1984	Eugen Volz	CDU	
1988	Eugen Volz	CDU	
1992	Eugen Volz	CDU	
Apr 1995	Ingrid Blank	CDU	
1996	Ingrid Blank	CDU	
2001	Günter Fischer	SPD	37.4
2006	Manfred Groh	CDU	36.4
2011	Manfred Groh	CDU	30.8
Oct 2014	Bettina Meier-Augenstein	CDU	30.8
2016	Bettina Lisbach	Grüne	36.2
Feb 2019	Ute Leidig	Grüne	36.2
2021	Ute Leidig	Grüne	39.1
2026	Ute Leidig	Grüne	39.9

=== Second mandate ===
Prior to the electoral reforms for the 2026 election, the seats in the state parliament were allocated proportionately amongst parties which received more than 5% of valid votes across the state. The seats that were won proportionally for parties that did not win as many first mandates as seats they were entitled to, were allocated to their candidates which received the highest proportion of the vote in their respective constituencies. This meant that following some elections, a constituency would have one or more members elected under a second mandate.

Prior to 2011, these second mandates were allocated to the party candidates who got the greatest number of votes, whilst from 2011-2021, these were allocated according to percentage share of the vote.

Election	Member	Party	Member	Party
1976	Dieter Stoltz	SPD	Jürgen Morlok	FDP
1980	Dieter Stoltz	SPD	Jürgen Morlok	FDP
1984	Dieter Stoltz	SPD	Jürgen Morlok	FDP
1988	Dieter Stoltz	SPD		
1992	Dieter Stoltz	SPD	Gerhard Stolz	Grüne
1996	Günter Fischer	SPD	Renate Rastätter	Grüne
2001			Renate Rastätter	Grüne
2006	Johannes Stober	SPD	Gisela Splett	Grüne
2011	Johannes Stober	SPD	Gisela Splett	Grüne
2016				
2021

== Election results ==
=== 2026 election ===
State election (2026): Karlsruhe I
Notes:	Blue background denotes the winner of the electorate vote. Pink background denotes a candidate elected from their party list. Yellow background denotes an electorate win by a list member, or other incumbent. A ✓ or ✗ denotes status of any incumbent, win or lose respectively.						
Party	Candidate	Votes	%	±%	Party votes	%	±%
Greens	✓ Ute Leidig	29,154	39.9	▲0.8	31,197	42.6	▲3.5
CDU	Robin Schuster	17,430	23.9	▲6.4	15,159	20.7	▲3.2
AfD	Oliver Schnell	8,202	11.2	▲4.6	8,030	11.0	▲4.3
Left	Rocco Jörger	6,069	8.3	▲1.4	6,400	8.7	▲1.8
SPD	Meri Uhlig	6,060	8.3	▼3.5	4,113	5.6	▼6.2
FDP	Jörg Breier	2,541	3.5	▼4.7	3,051	4.2	▼4.0
Volt	Cem Kont	2,065	2.8	▲1.1	1,428	2.0	▲0.2
BSW					968		
FW	Rena Thormann	1,460	2.0	▲0.6	781	1.1	▼0.4
APT					725	1.0	
PARTEI					408	0.6	▼1.6
dieBasis					169	0.2	▼0.7
Team Todenhöfer					144	0.2	
Bündnis C					138	0.2	▼0.1
ÖDP					119	0.2	▼0.3
Values					94	0.1	
Pensioners					81	0.1	
Humanists					64	0.1	▼0.4
KlimalisteBW					54	0.1	▼1.7
PdF					54	0.1	
Verjüngungsforschung					38	0.1	
Informal votes		533			299		
Total valid votes		72,981			73,215		
Turnout		73,514	71.8	▲7.9			
Greens hold	Majority	11,724	16.0	▼5.6			

=== 2021 election ===
State election (2026): Karlsruhe I
Party	Candidate	Votes	%	±%
Greens	Ute Leidig	25,748	39.1	▲2.9
CDU	Rahsan Dogan	11,507	17.5	▼3.7
SPD	Anton Huber	7,744	11.8	▼1.4
FDP	Norman Gaebel	5,394	8.2	▲0.5
Left	Christina Zacharias	4,552	6.9	▲2.1
AfD	Paul Schmidt	4,375	6.7	▼5.3
PARTEI	Bernd Föhr	1,425	2.2	▲1.2
KlimalisteBW	Saskia Knispel de Acosta	1,151	1.7	
Volt	Fabian Gaukel	1,129	1.7	
FW	Rena Thormann	944	1.4	
dieBasis	Alexander Buchfink	645	1.0	
ÖDP	Dirk Uehlein	319	0.5	▲0.1
Humanists	Sven Haiber	306	0.5	
WiR2020	Philippe Sebastian	324	0.5	
Bündnis C	Daniela Schlittenhardt	216	0.3	
Majority		14,241	21.6	
Rejected ballots		297	0.4	▼0.4
Turnout		66,076	63.9	▼7.3
Registered electors		103,423		
Greens hold		Swing		

== See also ==
- Politics of Baden-Württemberg
- Landtag of Baden-Württemberg
