= Otto Dullenkopf =

German politician

- Born: February 11, 1920; Karlsruhe
- Died: July 10, 2007 (aged 87); Karlsruhe
- Occupation: Politician
- Known for: Lord Mayor of Karlsruhe

Otto Dullenkopf (11 February 1920 - 10 June 2007) was a German politician of the CDU party and lord mayor of Karlsruhe.

== Biography ==
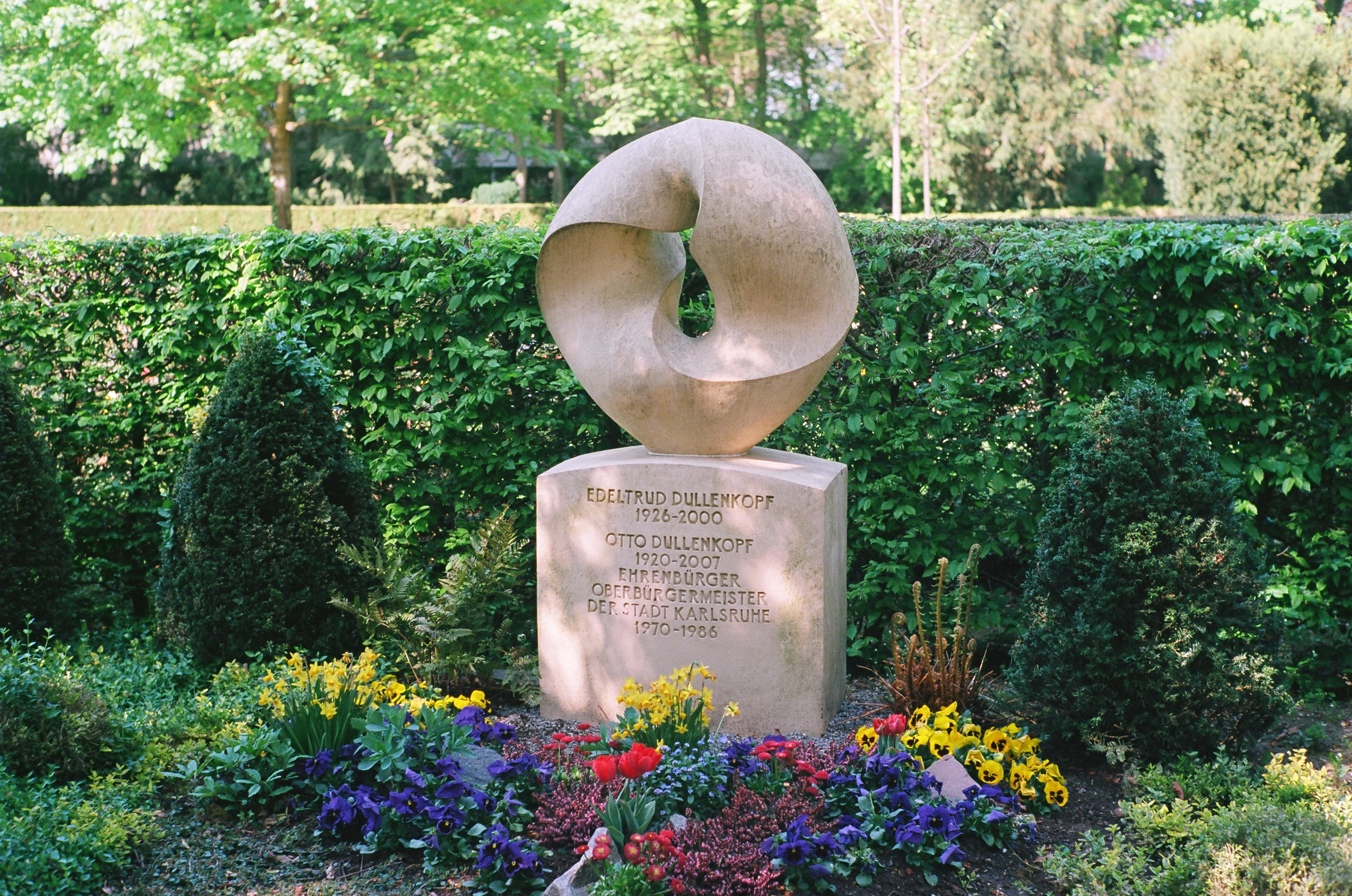
Grave of Otto Dullenkopf on the Rüppurr cemetery

The trained bank teller began his political career after the World War II. From 1947 to 1961 he was a city councilor in Karlsruhe. From 1956 to 1970 he was a CDU representative in the Landtag of Baden-Württemberg. From 1961 to 1970 he was mayor and from 1970 lord mayor of the city of Karlsruhe. He replaced Günther Klotz, who did not stand for re-election, in this office and held it until June 30, 1986.

Within his party he was district chairman of the Junge Union from 1947, regional manager of the CDU in 1948, leader of the CDU parliamentary group in the local council from 1959 to 1961 and chairman of the CDU Nordbaden from 1968 to 1970.

Hardly any other mayor has shaped the cityscape as much as Dullenkopf. During his term in office, the high debts that had been accumulated for the reconstruction and expansion of the city were reduced. In the course of the state's administrative reform, Dullenkopf successfully incorporated the boroughs Stupferich, Hohenwettersbach, Wolfartsweier, Grötzingen, Palmbach, Grünwettersbach and Neureut from 1972 to 1975, an increase of 32,000 new citizens and 5,000 hectares of land.

In 2012, the Ostauepark in Karlsruhe, built between 1997 and 2001, was renamed Otto-Dullenkopf-Park to his honor.
