= Hans Erich Slany =

Hans Erich Slany (26 October 1926 – 22 September 2013) was a German designer considered by many to have been the first industrial designer to design plastic housings for power tools. Slany is also thought of as one of the icons of design in Germany. He founded TEAMS Design GmbH, was a professor of Industrial Design (ID) for more than 20 years and helped found the Verband Deutscher Industrie Designer e. V. in 1959 (VDID - Germany's version of the Industrial Designers Society of America (IDSA)). He then helped the VDID with their entry into the International Council of Societies of Industrial Design (ICSID).

== Early years ==
Slany was born in 1926 in Böhmisch Wiesenthal, Czechoslovakia. He served in the Wehrmacht and was POW in World War II. After the war, he graduated in 1948 with a degree in Mechanical Engineering from Hochschule Esslingen, University of Applied Sciences. Out of school he obtained a position as a product developer and assistant technical manager at Firma Ritter Aluminum GmbH Esslingen am Neckar. He then went on to the styling department at Daimler AG Sindelfingen in the Mercedes-Benz studio where he worked for 2 years. While at Daimler, he worked on the distinctive gull wing Mercedes-Benz 300SL. He also collaborated with Heinrich Loffelhardt on the Ikonette Compact Camera for Zeiss-Ikon.

== Slany Design ==
In 1956 Hans Erich Slany founded his own design consultancy called SLANY Design. Soon after the founding, he approached Robert Bosch GmbH with his ideas for power tools housed in plastics. He was convinced that plastic housings would make the tools lighter, making the workers using them less prone to repetitive use injury. Also, it would reduce problems with electrical shocks. Robert Bosch GmbH even went on to publish a book called “The Influence of Ergonomics on the Design of Power Tools” based on Slany's recommendations to share with all their engineers and to follow up a traveling exhibition (Europe only) they sponsored called, “Making work easier: Ergonomics for power tools”. He believed that the designer should be the advocate of the user of the equipment they are called upon to design.

Slany was awarded an honorary doctorate by the Berlin University of the Arts in 1985. He also founded the industrial design program at the State Academy of Fine Arts Stuttgart which was the first intensive ID program in Germany.

Slany desired to infuse the company with a strong team based mentality. He said, "Früher arbeiteten Gestalter oft isoliert und mit künsterlischen Gestaltungskriterien, beeinflußt durch unterschiedliche kulturelle Anschauungsterndenzen. Der Industriedesigner heute arbeitet systematisch. Er analysiert, vergleicht, prüft und gestaltet erst dann... Ein kreatives, lebendiges Designteam bringt die besten Voraussetzunge für innovative Anregungen, die in den bereichsübergreifenden Entscheidungsprozeß einfließen." or translated into English, "Formerly designers often worked in isolation and with artificial design criteria, influenced by different cultural views and tendencies. Today's industrial designers work systematically. They analyze, compare, examine, and design only after that... A creative lively design team provides the best conditions for innovative stimuli that flow into the overall decision-making process."

== Professional community involvement – VDID ==
Slany along with six other professional industrial designers that later were referred to in publications and in the media as the "7", joined to found the VDID in 1959. The six other designers are Professor Arno Votteler, Hans-Theo Baumann, Herbert Hirche, Günter Kupetz, Rainer Schütze, and Peter Raacke. They believed that designers needed an association to promote professional advocacy, support them in both legal and educational issues, and to represent the profession to the public. Around that same time they joined the ICSID as a full member. VDID also works closely with the German Fashion and Textile Design Association (VDMD) under the umbrella of the German Designer Association (DDV).

== Later years – TEAMS Design ==
As Slany Design grew, Slany realized that the firm would have to evolve. He sold part of his shares in the company to two of his managers, Reinhard Renner and Klaus Schoen and changed the firm's name to Slany Design TEAMS. Finally when he retired in 1996, he was awarded the highest honor in Germany for lifetime service, the Bundesverdienstkreuz by then Federal President Roman Herzog. In accordance to Slany's ten-year plan, Renner and Schoen then removed Slany's name from the company name leaving simply TEAMS Design GmbH. A lot of Slany's founding philosophies are at the heart of the firm today, now expanding across 4 countries (Germany, Serbia, United States and China) with 5 offices in Esslingen, Hamburg, Belgrade, Chicago, and Shanghai. TEAMS Design continues to win awards and lead in the field of design while maintaining some of Slany's original clients like Robert Bosch GmbH, Karcher GmbH, Silit, and Leifheit.

== Awards and distinctions ==
1973-78 Awarded “Gute Form” awards also known as the German Design Award
1985 Honorary doctorate by the Berlin University of the Arts
1986 Became the Academic Director and a professor at the newly founded industrial design program for the Stuttgart State Academy of Art and Design. Founded the first study program leading to the degree, "Dipl. - Ingeniuerdesigner" in Germany (Diploma Designer)
1990 Awarded Design Team of the year award by Design Zentrum Nordrhein Westfalen in Essen also known as the Red Dot Design Award
1996 TEAMS / SLANY Design was ranked as the top design firm in Germany by Design Zentrum Nordrhein Westfalen (Red Dot Design Award) and second place worldwide
1996 Received highest order award in Germany, the Bundesverdienstkreuz for lifetime service.

== Bibliography ==
- Slany, Hans Erich; Stefanie Leisentritt, (2013). "Industriedesign - Eine Erfolgsgeschichte", Verlag Sindlinger-Burchartz, ISBN 978-3-928812-64-1
- Bauer, Wolfgang-Otto (2007). European Cutlery Design 1948-2000, Arnoldsche Art Publishers, ISBN 978-3-89790-246-6.
- Betts, Paul, (2007), The Authority of Everyday Objects: A Cultural History of West German Industrial Design (Weimar and Now: German Cultural Criticism), University of California Press, ISBN 978-0-520-25384-1
- Godau, Marion; * Antonelli, Paola, (2007) Design Directory Germany, Universe, ISBN 978-0-7893-0389-9
- Fiell, Peter; Fiell, Charlotte; Krumhauer, Julia, (2003). Industrial Design A-Z, Tashen, ISBN 978-3-8228-2426-9
- Kupetz, Andrej, editor (2001). "Gunter Kupetz: Industrial Design", Birkhauser Architecture, ISBN 978-3-7643-7688-8
- Zec, Prof. Peter, (1997). German Design Standards, Koln: DuMont, ISBN 978-3-7701-4290-3
- Marquart, Christian, (1994). Industrial Culture - Industrial Design: A Piece of German Economic and Design History: The Founder Members of the Association of German Industrial, John Wiley & Sons, ISBN 978-3-433-02343-3
- Zimmer, Prof. Dieter. "Zwei x 12 Deutsche Designer", md Moebel Interior Design 1987
- Ogursky, Guenter; Stof, Gabrielle (editors) (Unknown). The Influence of Ergonomics on the Design of Power Tools, Robert Bosch GmbH, Stuttgart
