= Hagsfeld =

District of Karlsruhe

- Borough of Karlsruhe
- Coat of arms

- Location of Hagsfeld in Karlsruhe
- Interactive map of Hagsfeld
- Location within Germany Location within Baden-Württemberg
- Coordinates: 49°2′N 8°27′E
- Country: Germany
- State: Baden-Württemberg
- District: Urban district
- City: Karlsruhe

Area
  - Total: 7.1762 km^{2} (2.7707 sq mi)
- Elevation: 114 m (374 ft)

Population (2014-06-30)
  - Total: 7,119
  - Density: 992.0/km^{2} (2,569/sq mi)
- Time zone: UTC+01:00 (CET)
  - Summer (DST): UTC+02:00 (CEST)
- Postal codes: 76139
- Dialling codes: 0721

Hagsfeld is a district in the north east of Karlsruhe, Germany. Hagsfeld borders the Stutensee district of Blankenloch in the north, Weingarten in the northeast and the Karlsruhe districts Grötzingen in the east, Durlach in the southeast, Rintheim in the south and Waldstadt in the west.

The district is further divided into Alt-Hagsfeld and Westlicher Teil.

== History ==
In 991 Hagsfeld was mentioned for the first time as "Habachesfelt". According to tradition, the name comes from the fact that a new community was built on a field full of "Habachen" (probably trees).

On December 2, 1261, Pope Urban IV confirmed that "Hagesvelt" and all its farms belonged to Gottesaue Monastery. Margrave Jakob I bequeathed Hagsfeld to his son George of Baden in 1453. The Laurentius Church and the cemetery were also mentioned in 1499 as the property of Gottesaue Monastery.

The Thirty Years' War also claimed many victims in Hagsfeld, so that in 1650 there were only 45 residents left. In 1851 Hagsfeld comprised 110 houses in which a total of 908 residents lived.

The Hagsfeld volunteer fire department was founded in 1874 and the first train station was built in 1895. The first gas line followed in 1909, and the population rose to 2,000 in 1911.

During the Nazi era, the free gymnastics association and the workers' sports club were banned in 1933. On April 1, 1938, Hagsfeld with 2,962 residents was incorporated into the city of Karlsruhe. On the 24th and 25th in April 1944, misguided British aircraft dropped the bombs destined for the Karlsruhe train station area over Hagsfeld, among other places; the place was largely destroyed.
