= Anja Gockel =

German fashion designer

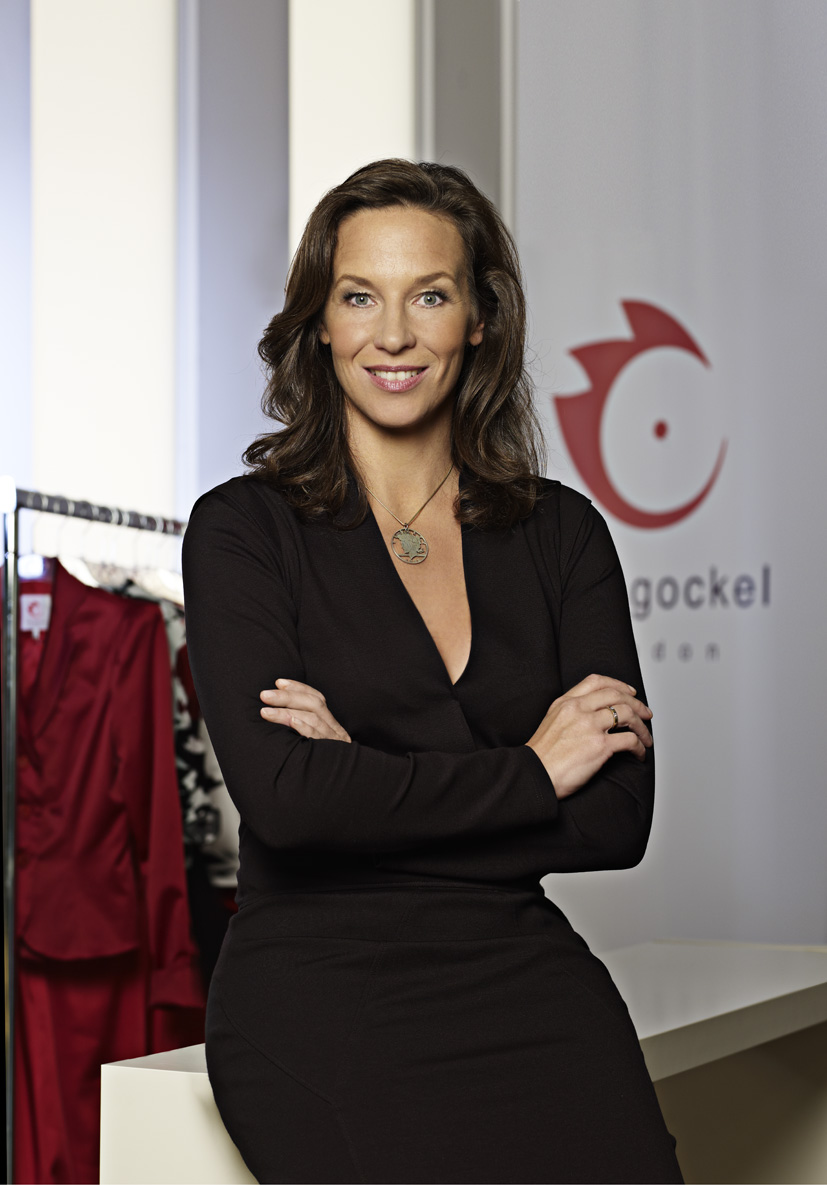
- Gockel in 2010
- Born: 16 May 1968 (age 57); Mainz, West Germany
- Website: https://anja-gockel.com/

Anja Gockel (born 16 May 1968) is a German fashion designer. Her poetically dreamy and colorful fashion is internationally recognized. Her customers include celebrities such as Queen Silvia of Sweden, Ann-Kathrin Kramer, Barbara Schöneberger, Mina Tander and Marietta Slomka.

== Career ==
From 1987 to 1995, Gockel studied fashion design at the Hamburg University of Applied Sciences and at Central Saint Martins in London. From 1995 to 1996, she worked for Vivienne Westwood and created the line h 'by Carlotta h'Glesse. Since 1996, she has her own fashion label Anja Gockel London for women's fashion with a red cockscomb as the company logo.

In 2000, Gockel returned to Mainz, where she moved into a studio in the Alte Patrone.

She provided the final show of Germany's Next Topmodel by Heidi Klum three times and twice she was there live. First, Gockel flew to Los Angeles for a fourth season. In 2010, Klum and her young models came to Berlin for Gockel's fashion show. Internationally successful supermodels such as Alek Wek also work for the German label, which was able to grow in 2010. In 2014, Gockel participated in the trade fair Chic Beijing for the first time. In 2016, she celebrated the 20th birthday of her fashion label at Berlin Fashion Week. In January 2017, Gockel was named Designer of the Year 2017 by the Network of German Fashion & Textile Designers. At the same time, her fashion show took place for the first time during the Berlin fashion week in the lobby of the Hotel Adlon Kempinski at Brandenburg Gate. In 2018 she was appointed ambassador for design and fashion culture (network of German fashion and textile designers). In March 2020, Gockel opened her first flagship store in Berlin, called "Paris44".

== Reception ==
- 1994: Winner of the Parliament of Fashion Philipp Morris competition
- 2012: Golden Silk Ribbon
- 2017: Designer of the Year by Verband Deutscher Industrie Designer
- 2018: Ambassador for Design and Fashion Culture, Network of German Fashion and Textile Designers
- 2019: Innovative Entrepreneurial Personality with International Appeal award from the Rhineland-Palatinate Future Initiative (ZIRP)
- 2020: Ministry of Economic Affairs, Transport, Agriculture and Viticulture of Rhineland-Palatinate recognized Gockel's brand as being nne of the 30 Most Sustainable Companies in Rhineland-Palatinate

== Personal life ==
Gockel works in Mainz. She is married and has four children.
