= Bulach =

Bulach may refer to:

- Beiertheim-Bulach, a borough of Karlsruhe
- Bülach, a historic town in Switzerland
