= Bahnhofsviertel (disambiguation) =

Bahnhofsviertel may refer to:

- Bahnhofsviertel, a borough of Frankfurt
- Südstadt (Karlsruhe), the former name of a borough of Karlsruhe
