= Südstadt =

Südstadt may refer to:

- Südstadt (Karlsruhe), a borough of Karlsruhe
- Südstadt (Heidelberg), a borough of Heidelberg
- Südstadt (Flensburg), a borough of Flensburg
- Südstadt (Tübingen), a borough of Tübingen
