= Waldstadt =

Waldstadt can mean:

- a subdivision in Zossen, Germany
- an alternate name for the Poking DP camp in post-World War II Germany
- an alternate spelling of Waldstatt, a municipality in Switzerland
- Waldstadt (Karlsruhe), a district of Karlsruhe
