= Karcher =

Karcher or Kärcher is a surname. Notable people with the surname include:

- Alfred Kärcher, German industrialist
- Alan Karcher (1943–1999), New Jersey politician (father of Ellen Karcher)
- Amalie Kärcher (1819–1887), German artist
- Carl Karcher (1917–2008), restaurateur, founder of the Carl's Jr. hamburger chain
- Ellen Karcher (born 1964), New Jersey politician, state senator (daughter of Alan Karcher)
- Ernst Friedrich Kärcher (1789–1855), German educator and philologist
- J. Clarence Karcher (1894-1978), geophysicist and inventor of the reflection seismograph and founder of what would become Texas Instruments
- Jim Karcher (1914–1997), American football player
- Karl-Ehrhart Karcher (1918–1973), German World War II Schnellboot commander
- Ken Karcher (born 1963), American football player
- Mark Karcher (born 1978), American basketball player
- Margaret Karcher (1915–2006), American restaurateur

== See also ==
- Kärcher, a German cleaning equipment manufacturer best known for high-pressure cleaning products
