= Grötzingen Jewish Cemetery =

Jewish cemetery in Karlsruhe, Baden-Württemberg, Germany

- Jüdischer Friedhof Grötzingen; Judengottesacker Grötzingen
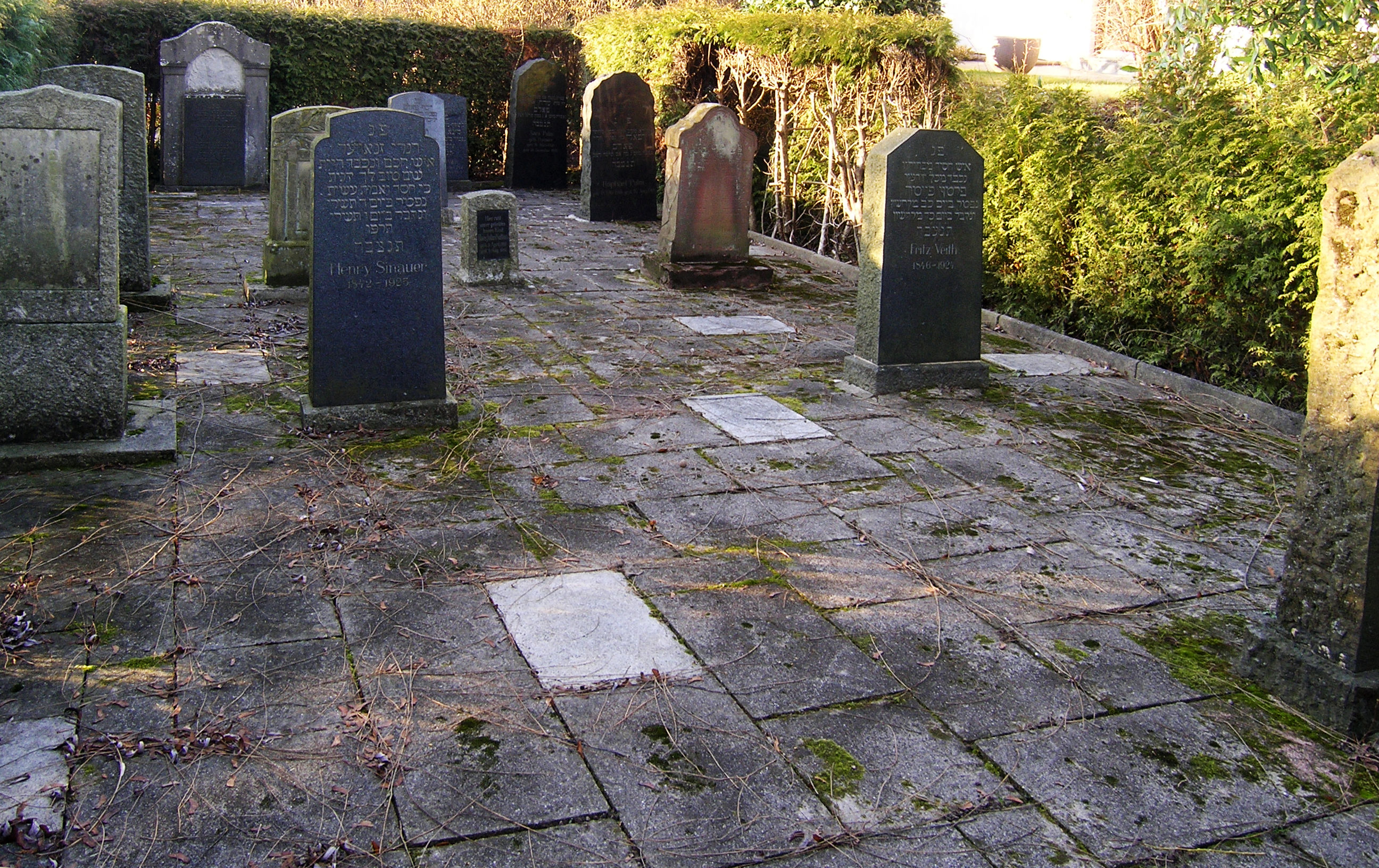

Details
- Established: 1905–1906
- Abandoned: yes
- Location: Grötzingen, Karlsruhe, Baden-Württemberg
- Country: Germany
- Coordinates: 49°0′43.8″N 8°29′55.1″E
- Type: Jewish cemetery
- No. of graves: 13

Grötzingen Jewish Cemetery (German: jüdischer Friedhof Grötzingen or Judengottesacker Grötzingen) is the smallest Jewish burial place in the city of Karlsruhe, Baden-Württemberg, Germany. It is listed as a national heritage site.

== History ==
Until 1900, the dead of the Jewish community of Grötzingen were buried at Obergrombach Jewish Cemetery northeast of Karlsruhe. The Jewish cemetery of Grötzingen was built in 1905–6 on Junghälden field on Werrabronner Straße. It is now surrounded by modern buildings.

The cemetery stretches on a 0.18 acres area and has 13 graves, the oldest datable one being from 1905.

The ground of the cemetery is fully covered with screed.

== Bibliography ==
- Asche, Susanne (1988). "Vom Traditionalismus auf dem Land zur Anpassung in der Stadt. Die Geschichte der Juden in Grötzingen und Durlach 1715−1933". In Schmitt, Heinz (ed.). Juden in Karlsruhe. Beiträge zu ihrer Geschichte bis zur nationalsozialistischen Machtergreifung (in German). Karlsruhe: Badenia-Verlag. pp. 189–218.
- Hahn, Joachim; Krüger, Jürgen. Synagogen in Baden-Württemberg (in German). Vol. 2. : Hahn, Joachim (2007). Orte und Einrichtungen. Stuttgart: Konrad Theiss Verlag. ISBN 978-3-8062-1843-5. (Gedenkbuch der Synagogen in Deutschland, vol. 4), p. 232—235.
