= Weiherfeld-Dammerstock =

District of Karlsruhe

- Borough of Karlsruhe
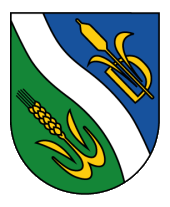
- Coat of arms

- Location of Weiherfeld-Dammerstock within Karlsruhe
- Interactive map of Weiherfeld-Dammerstock
- Location within Germany Location within Baden-Württemberg
- Coordinates: 48°59′N 8°24′E
- Country: Germany
- State: Baden-Württemberg
- District: Urban district
- City: Karlsruhe

Area
  - Total: 3.04 km^{2} (1.17 sq mi)
- Elevation: 112–118 m (367–387 ft)

Population (2014-06-30)
  - Total: 5,982
  - Density: 1,970/km^{2} (5,100/sq mi)
- Time zone: UTC+01:00 (CET)
  - Summer (DST): UTC+02:00 (CEST)
- Postal codes: 76137, 76199
- Dialling codes: 0721

Weiherfeld-Dammerstock is a southern borough of Karlsruhe. In the north it is bordered by the Südtangente and in the east by Ettlinger Straße. The two districts of Weiherfeld and Dammerstock are separated by the Alb and are only connected by a road bridge and two pedestrian bridges.

== History ==
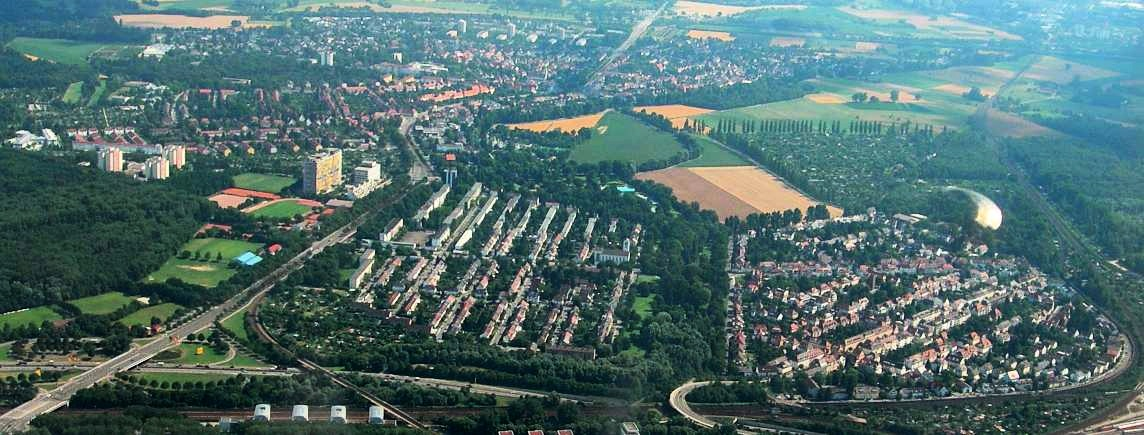
Aerial photograph of the borough from the north, Dammerstock on the left and Weiherfeld on the right. Back left is Rüppurr.

Weiherfeld was first mentioned in 1540 as "waldt der weyr gen" and belonged to Rüppurr until 1800 and then to Beiertheim. Until the beginning of the 20th century, there were only meadows and agricultural areas in the area of today's district.

The first plans for the construction of Weiherfeld were presented in 1913, but construction could not begin until seven years later. The first apartments were completed in November 1923 and construction was completed in July 1927. Dammerstock was built in just seven months according to the plans of Walter Gropius and was inaugurated on September 29, 1929.
