= Hohenwettersbach =

District of Karlsruhe

- Borough of Karlsruhe
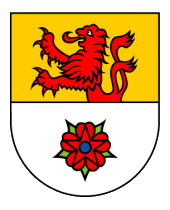
- Coat of arms

- Location of Hohenwettersbach within Karlsruhe
- Interactive map of Hohenwettersbach
- Location within Germany Location within Baden-Württemberg
- Coordinates: 48°58′N 8°28′E
- Country: Germany
- State: Baden-Württemberg
- District: Urban district
- City: Karlsruhe

Area
  - Total: 4.1313 km^{2} (1.5951 sq mi)

Population (2020-12-31)
  - Total: 3,068
  - Density: 742.6/km^{2} (1,923/sq mi)
- Time zone: UTC+01:00 (CET)
  - Summer (DST): UTC+02:00 (CEST)
- Postal codes: 76228
- Dialling codes: 0721

Hohenwettersbach is a district of the Baden-Württemberg city of Karlsruhe. It is located east of Durlach on the mountain between Wolfartsweier and Grünwettersbach. Since January 2021, Hohenwettersbach has been part of the Central/North Black Forest Nature Park.

== History ==
Hohenwettersbach was first mentioned in 1262 under the name Dürrenwettersbach (because there was always a water shortage ("Dürre") due to its geographical location). On December 19, 1971, the incorporation contract in Hohenwettersbach was signed by Mayor Erwin Gräber and Lord Mayor Otto Dullenkopf. The contract came into force on January 1, 1972.

Adalbert von Gontard (1900–1976), deputy chairman of the board of directors of Anheuser-Busch and a son of Paul von Gontard, owned an estate named Batzenhof in Hohenwettersbach since 1960 and was buried in the cemetery in Hohenwettersbach.
