= Friedhof Rüppurr =

Cemetery in Karlsruhe, Germany

Coordinates: 48.97075°N 8.40050°E

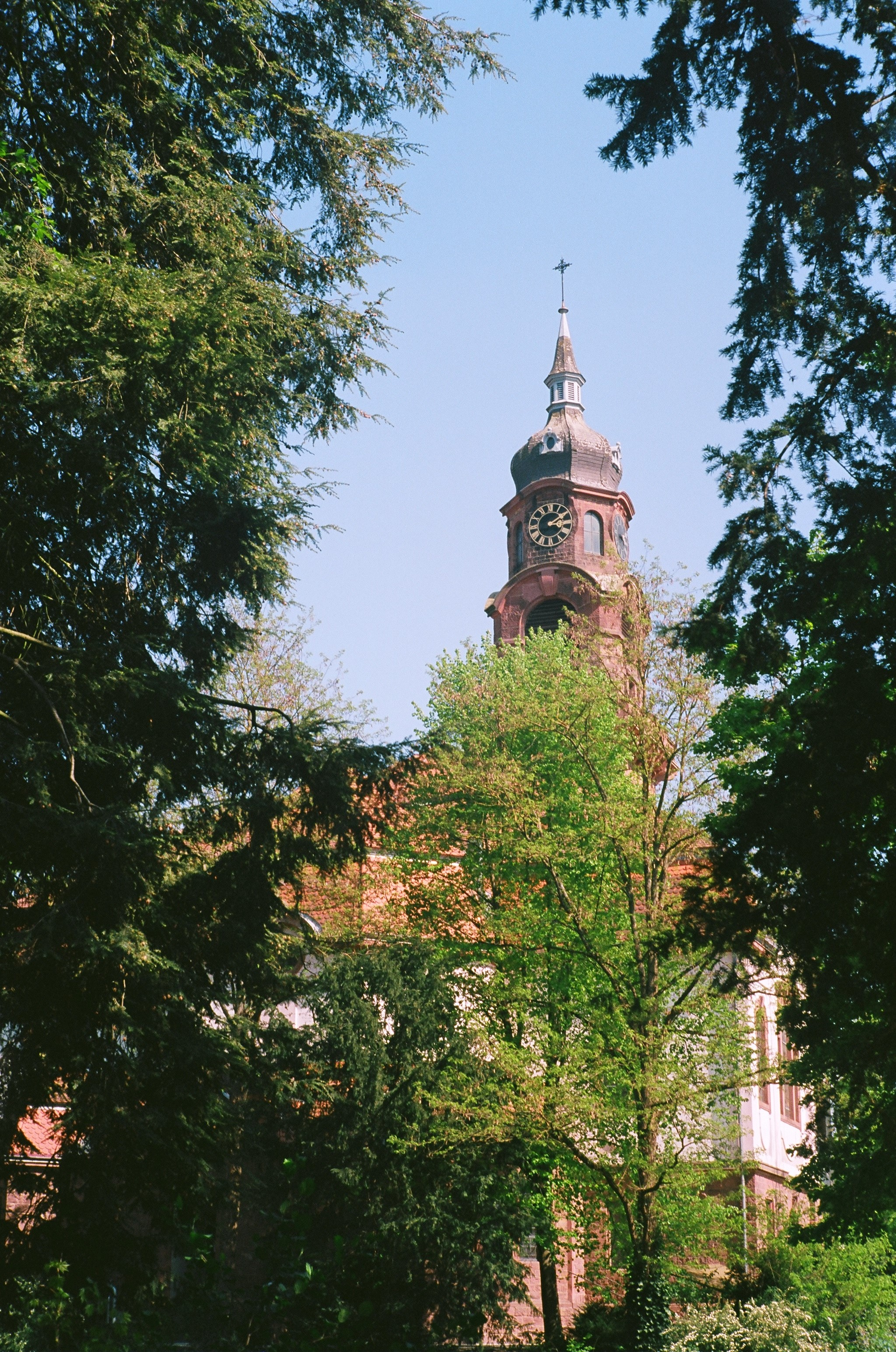
Evangelical Resurrection Church Rüppurr

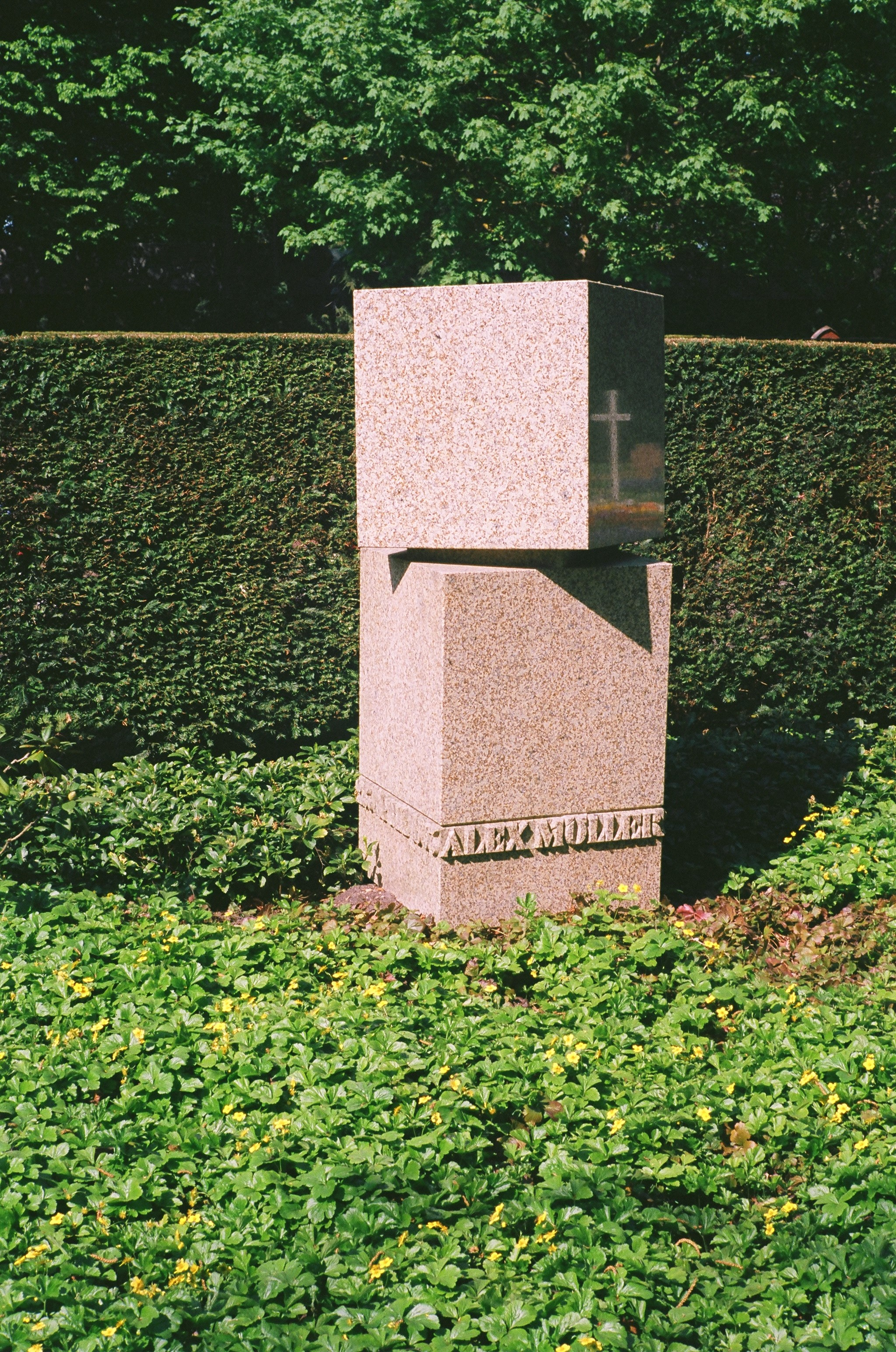
Tomb of Alex Möller

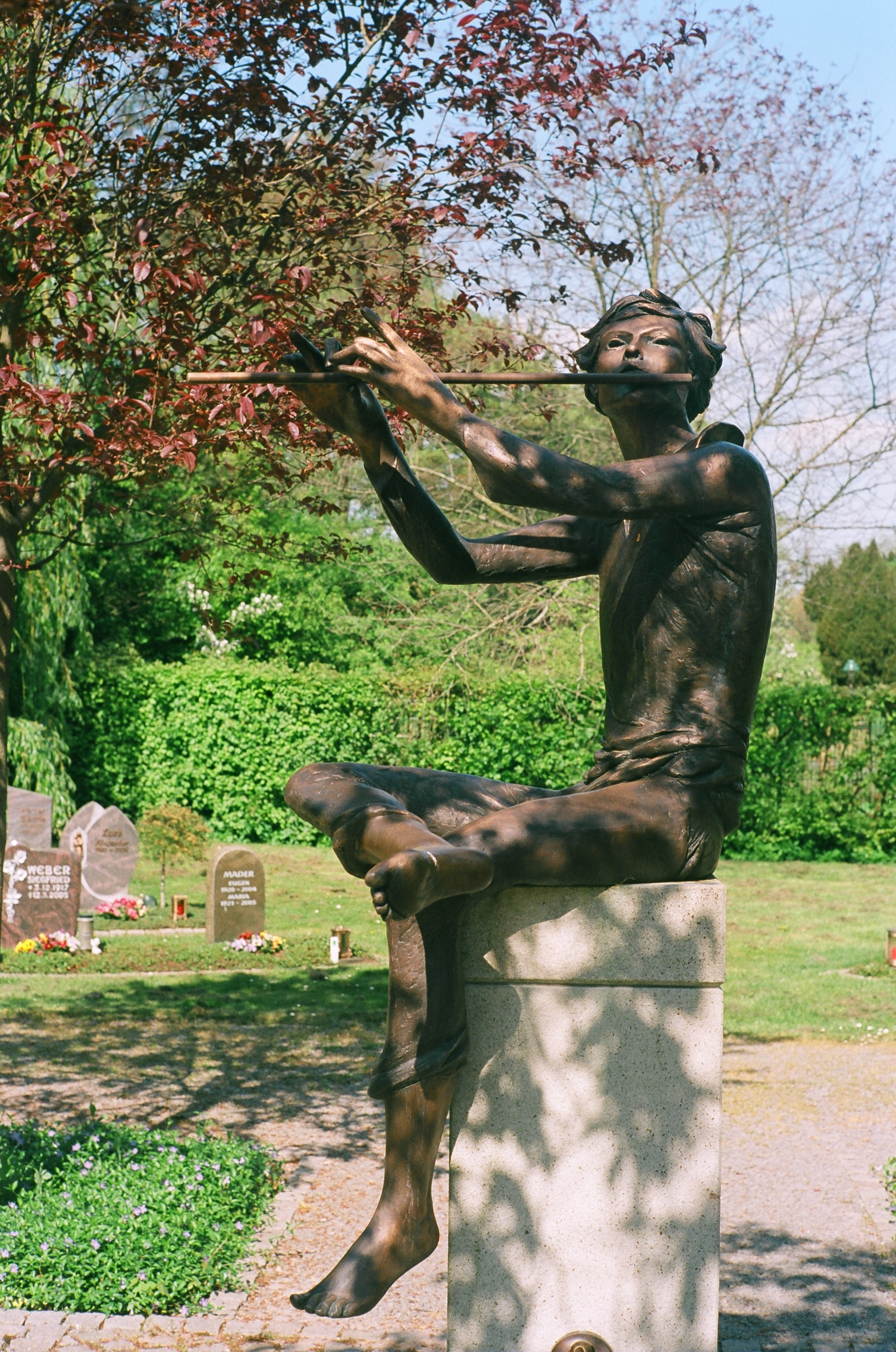
Sculpture in the cemetery

The Friedhof Rüppurr (German for Rüppurr Cemetery) is a grave complex in the southern district of Rüppurr in the city of Karlsruhe in Baden-Württemberg. The cemetery area has a size of approx. 4.2 hectares and is laid out in the style of a rural cemetery.

== History ==
The district cemetery Rüppurr was first mentioned in a document in 1594 by Margrave Ernst Friedrich. The laying of the foundation stone of the tomb is dated between 1582 and 1586. The cemetery has been expanded several times over the centuries. The last time this happened in 1954 when a new area on the western side of the river was released for expansion. The new mourning hall was also built on this side. To the north of the hall, a Ehrengrab was inaugurated in 1964 for the fallen soldiers of the two world wars. There is also a burial ground for the sisters of the evangelical deaconesses on the site.

In 1908 the present church building at the cemetery was inaugurated, the Protestant Auferstehungskirche. The river Alb flows through the cemetery, dividing it into the older, eastern and the newer, western sections. Both parts were connected to each other by a new bridge in 1955.

== Graves of famous people ==
The following famous people, among others, were buried at the Friedhof Rüppurr:

- Wilhelm Baur (1895–1973), publisher
- Julius Bender (1893–1966), bishop of the Protestant regional church in Baden
- Otto Dullenkopf (1920–2007), Lord Mayor
- Hans Kampffmeyer (1876–1932), founder of the Gartenstadt Karlsruhe
- Ludwig Martin (1909–2010), Attorney General
- Alex Möller (1903–1985), Federal Minister of Finance
- Leonhard Mülfarth (1921–2009), author and professor
- Friedrich Töpper (1891–1953), Lord Mayor
- Heinrich Jagusch (1908–1987), Senate President at the BGH
