= Loučná pod Klínovcem =

- Town
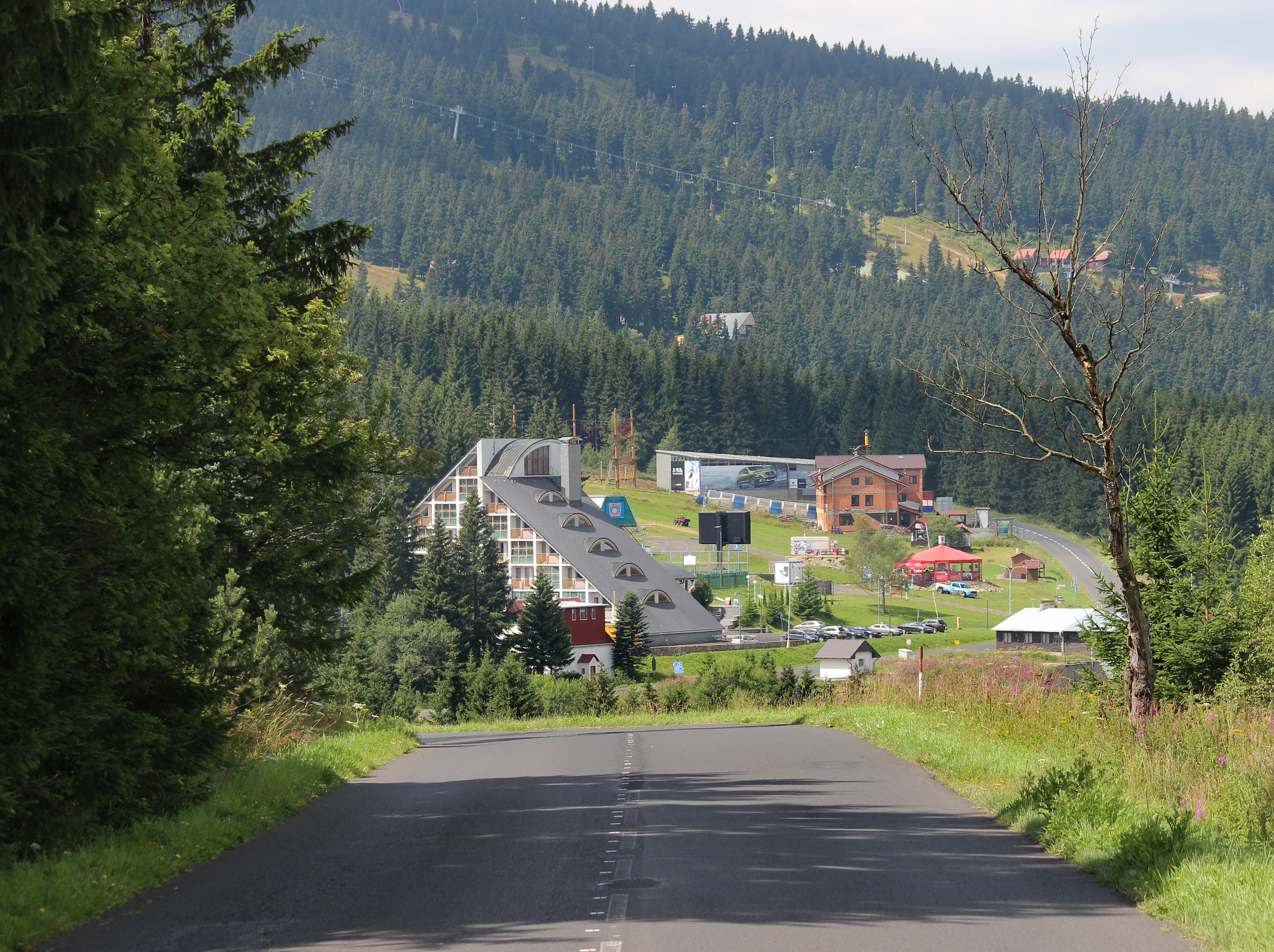
- Road to Loučná pod Klínovcem

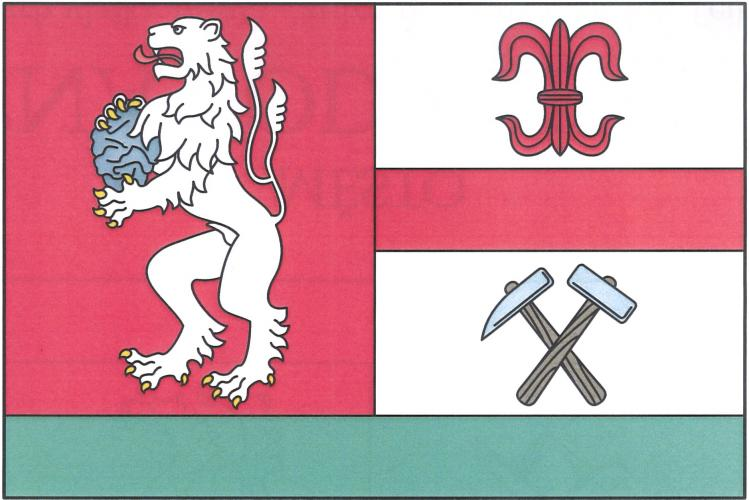
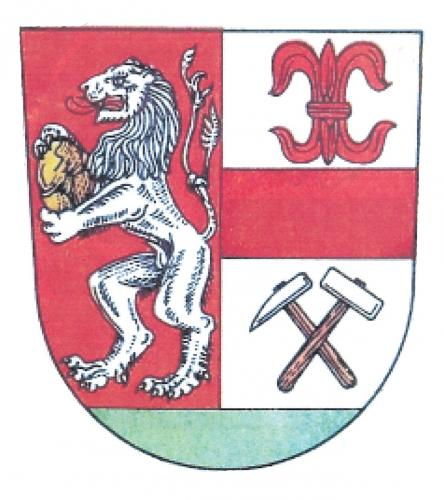
- Flag Coat of arms

- Location in the Czech Republic
- Coordinates: 50°24′46″N 12°59′23″E
- Country: Czech Republic
- Region: Ústí nad Labem
- District: Chomutov
- First mentioned: 1431

Government
  - Mayor: Jana Nýdrová

Area
  - Total: 20.89 km^{2} (8.07 sq mi)
- Elevation: 865 m (2,838 ft)

Population (2026-01-01)
  - Total: 214
  - Density: 10.2/km^{2} (26.5/sq mi)
- Time zone: UTC+1 (CET)
  - Summer (DST): UTC+2 (CEST)
- Postal code: 431 91
- Website: www.loucna.eu

Loučná pod Klínovcem (Czech pronunciation: [ˈloutʃnaː ˈpot kliːnoftsɛm]; until 1947 Český Wiesenthal; German: Böhmisch Wiesenthal) is a town in Chomutov District in the Ústí nad Labem Region of the Czech Republic. It has about 200 inhabitants, which makes it the second least populous town in the country. The town is located in the Ore Mountains and is known for its ski resort.

== Administrative division ==
Loučná pod Klínovcem consists of two municipal parts (in brackets population according to the 2021 census):

- Háj (53)
- Loučná (40)

== Etymology ==
The German name Wiesenthal means 'meadow valley'. After the neighbouring Oberwiesenthal was founded, it became known as Český Wiesenthal (German: Böhmisch Wiesenthal). In 1947, the town was renamed Loučná (literally 'meadow's' in Czech). In 2004, the town was renamed Loučná pod Klínovcem ('Loučná below Klínovec').

== Geography ==
Loučná pod Klínovcem is located about 30 kilometres (19 mi) west of Chomutov and 21 km (13 mi) north of Karlovy Vary. The town lies on the border with Germany, the German part of the divided town is called Oberwiesenthal. It lies in the Ore Mountains. The highest point of the municipal territory and of the entire Ústí nad Labem Region is a contour line below the top of the mountain Klínovec at 1,231 m (4,039 ft) above sea level.

== History ==
The first written mention of Loučná is from 1431, under its German name Wiesenthal. The village was probably founded in the 14th century. The village was destroyed during the Hussite Wars and left abandoned. In 1526, silver ore was found near the former settlement. In 1527, a new settlement, Oberwiesenthal, was founded beyond the Bohemian–Saxon border. In the same year, Loučná was promoted to a mining town. However, the abandoned settlement was resettled only in 1528. Importance of the town began to grow and in 1601, it was promoted to a royal mining town by Emperor Rudolf II.

The development ended as a result of the Thirty Years' War. In 1640, Loučná was burned down by the Swedish army, lost its title of a town and mining activity ceased completely.

Between 1986 and 1991, Loučná was a municipal part of Vejprty. In 2006, the municipality regained the town status.

== Demographics ==
Historical population

Year	Pop.	±%
1869	1,981	—
1880	2,108	+6.4%
1890	2,224	+5.5%
1900	2,419	+8.8%
1910	2,483	+2.6%

Year	Pop.	±%
1921	2,230	−10.2%
1930	2,583	+15.8%
1950	1,079	−58.2%
1961	599	−44.5%
1970	209	−65.1%

Year	Pop.	±%
1980	73	−65.1%
1991	23	−68.5%
2001	68	+195.7%
2011	78	+14.7%
2021	93	+19.2%

Source: Censuses

== Transport ==
On the Czech–German border is the road border crossing Loučná / Oberwiesenthal.

== Sport ==
A large ski resort is located on the slopes of Klínovec.

== Sights ==
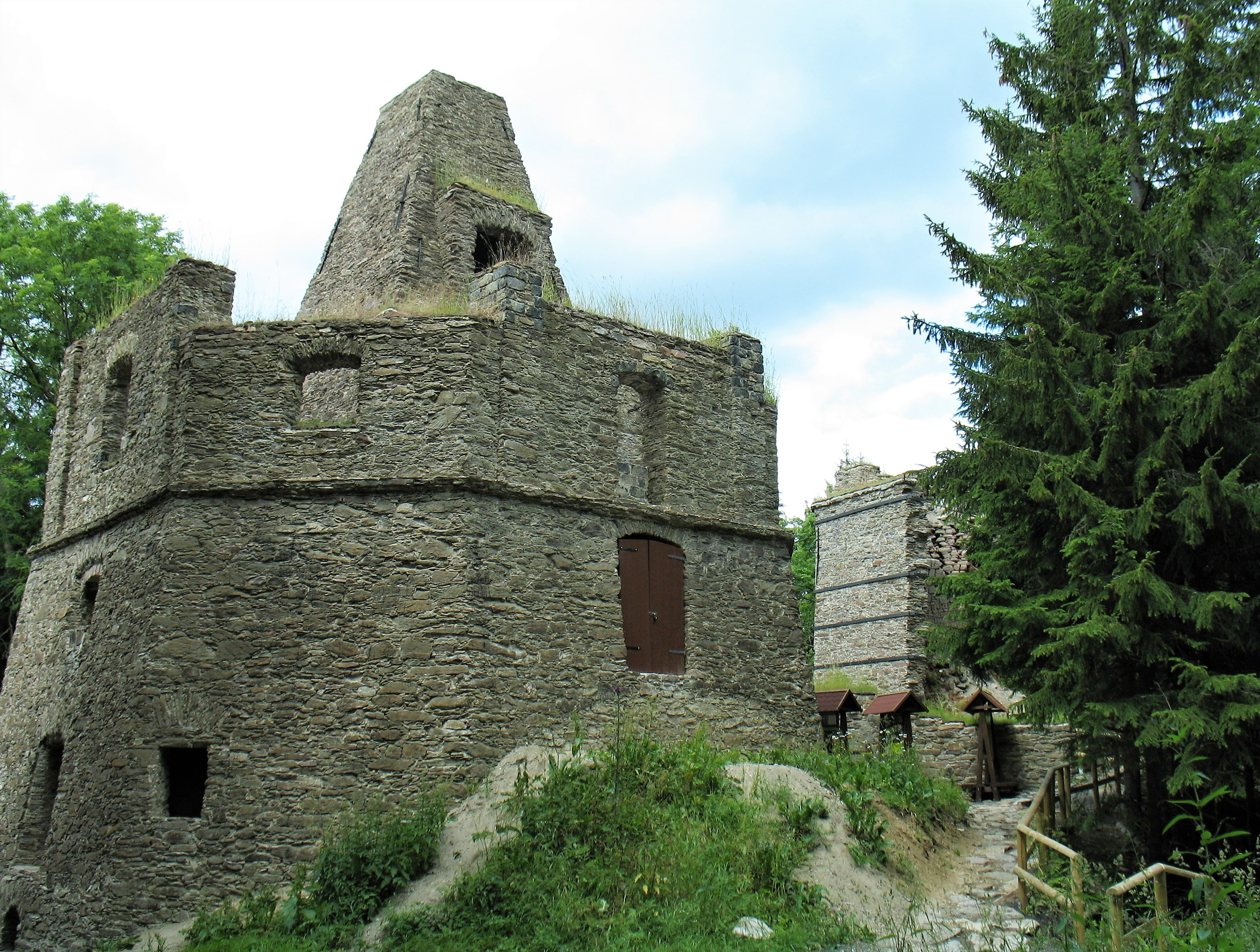
Lime kiln

The most important monument is the former lime kiln, located in the woods in the northern part of the municipality. This technical monument is a Neo-Romanesque building from 1851. Production in it ceased in the 1920s.

== Notable people ==
- Hans Erich Slany (1926–2013), German industrial designer
