= Herbert Hirche =

German architect and designer (1910–2002)

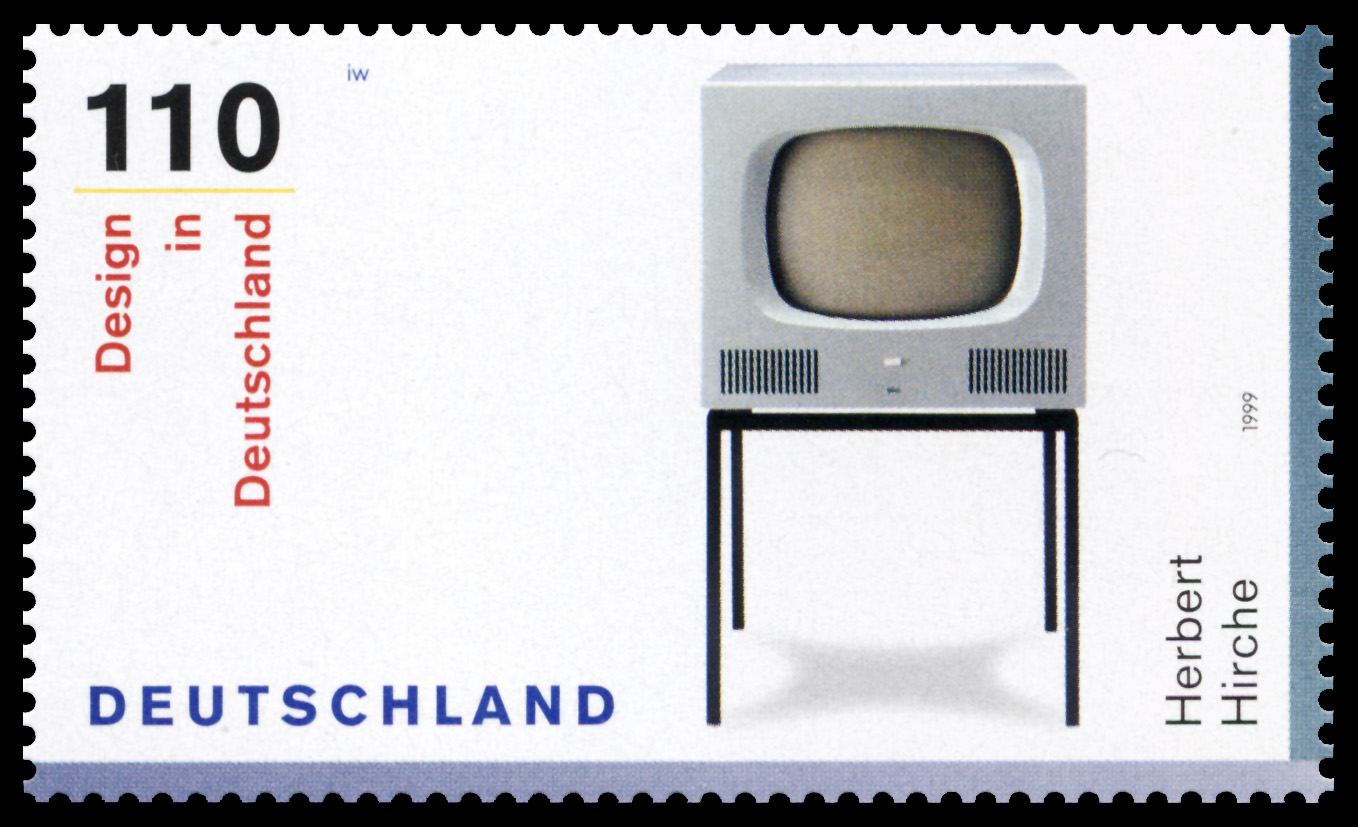
- Born: 20 May 1910; Görlitz
- Died: 28 January 2002 (aged 91)
- Alma mater: Bauhaus
- Occupation: Architect
- Employer: A. Polak

Herbert Hirche (20 May 1910 in Görlitz – 28 January 2002 in Heidelberg) was a German architect and furniture and product designer.

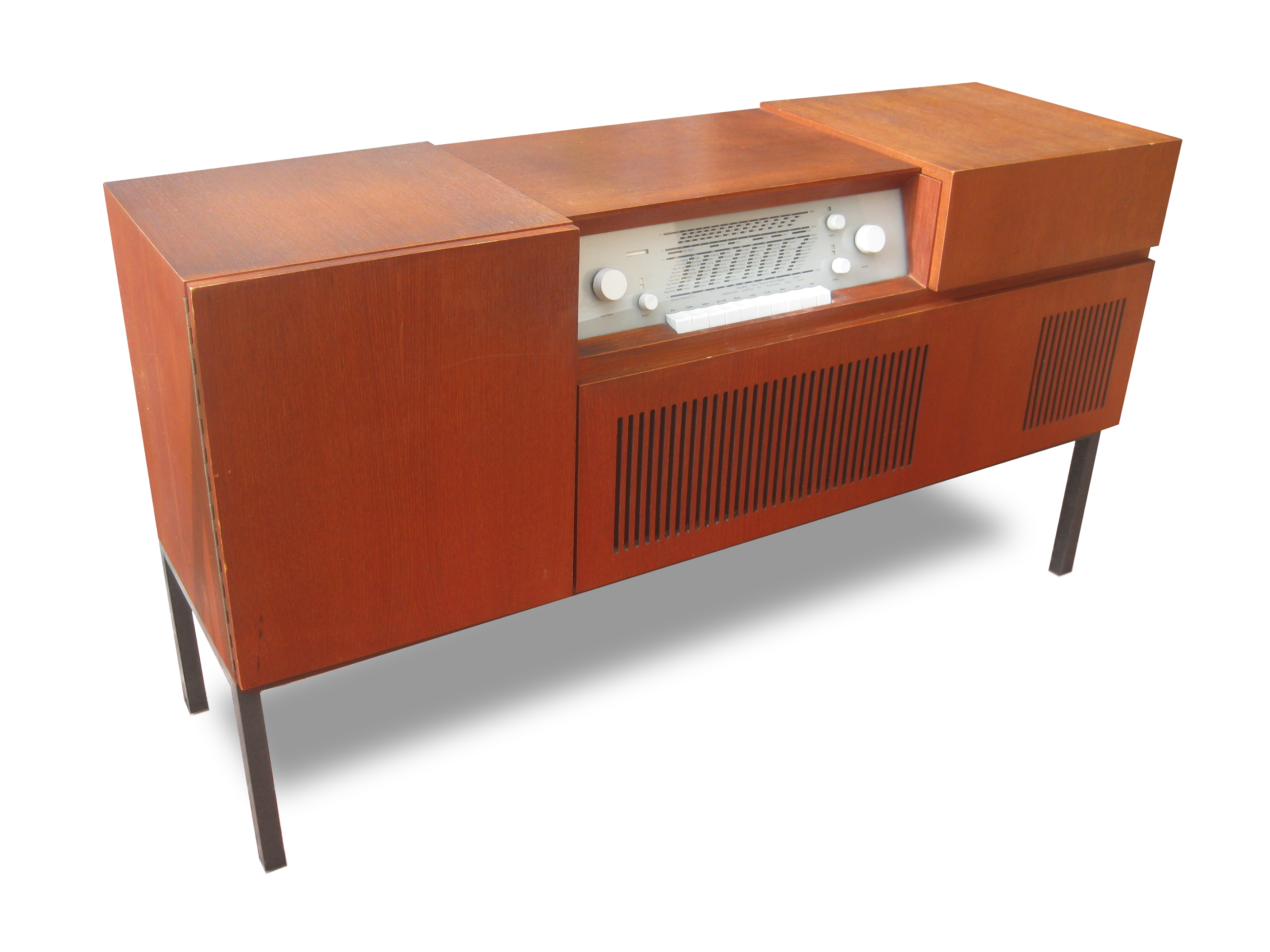
Braun HM 6-81 radiogram (1958)

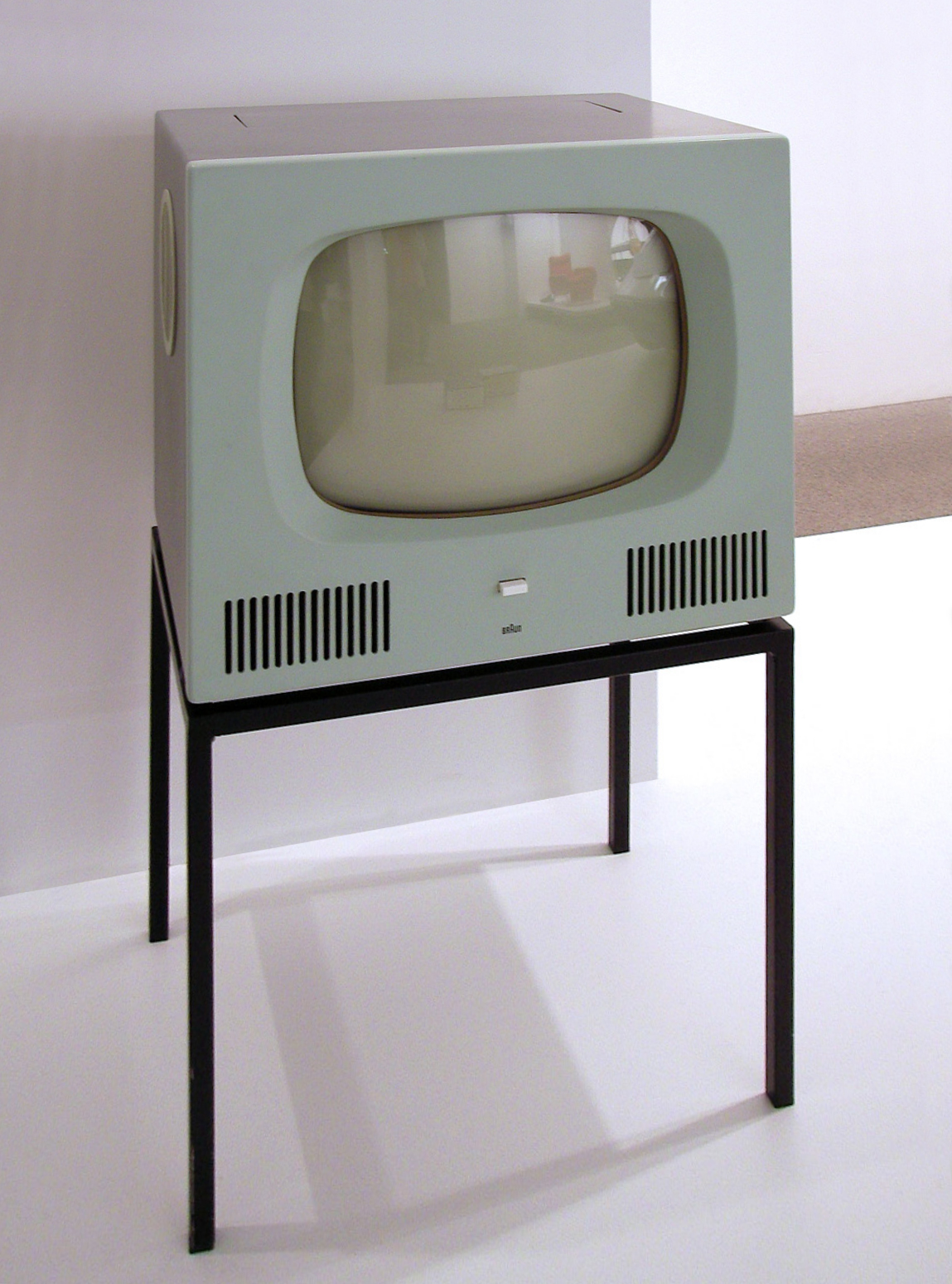
Braun HF 1 television (1958)

Herbert Hirche studied from 1930 to 1933 at the Bauhaus in Dessau and Berlin. His teachers included, Wassily Kandinsky and Ludwig Mies van der Rohe. From 1934 to 1938, he worked in Mies van der Rohe's office in Berlin, until his boss emigrated to the United States. From 1939 to 1945, Hirche worked for Egon Eiermann, after 1945 for Hans Scharoun. In 1948, he was appointed Professor of Applied Arts at the Kunsthochschule Berlin-Weißensee, which had only been recently founded in 1946. It was in the Soviet Occupied Zone of Berlin. Hirche moved to West Germany and from 1952 to 1975, he took an appointment at the State Academy of Fine Arts Stuttgart as Professor of Interior Design and Furniture Making.

When the company Braun began to be more design oriented company, they hired Hans Gugelot and Herbert Hirche, this new design line was continued later by Dieter Rams. Radiograms by Braun, designed by Herbert Hirche were found in the late 1950s in every modern villa in central Europe, many architects recommended these devices to equip their buildings.

Hirche's work was also shown at national and international fairs and exhibitions. These include the Milan Triennale in 1957 and Expo 58, the 1958 Brussels World's Fair. In 1964, examples of his works were shown on the documenta III in Kassel in Industrial Design.

Hirche was honoured in 1999 with a German postage stamp featuring his work.

He died in Heidelberg in 2002, aged 91.

== See also ==
- Verband Deutscher Industrie Designer
- Wilkhahn
