= Verband Deutscher Industrie Designer =

Verband Deutscher Industrie Designer e.V. or VDID is a professional organization for industrial designers based in Germany that was founded by seven German designers in 1959. The VDID is an association of German designers founded to promote the exchange of knowledge, ideas, professionalism, friendship, and support to all members to assist in the everyday working environment and career of industrial designers. The VDID works as a mediator between industry and designers, as well as politics and the economy. This organization is a sister organization to the Industrial Designers Society of America (IDSA) through the International Council of Societies of Industrial Design (ICSID).

== History ==
Seven professional industrial designers that later were referred to in publications and in the media as the "7", joined together to found the VDID in 1959. These seven designers are Professor Arno Votteler, Professor Hans Erich Slany, Hans-Theo Baumann, Herbert Hirche, (de)Günter Kupetz, Rainer Schütze, and (de)Peter Raacke. They believed that designers needed an association to promote professional advocacy, support them in both legal and educational issues, and to represent the profession to the public. Around that same time they joined the ICSID as a full member. VDID also works closely with the German Fashion and Textile Design Association (VDMD) under the umbrella of the German Designer Association (DDV).

== Exhibitions, Meetings, Contests and Design Awards ==
The VDID promotes many other organizations within Germany and all of Europe by promoting exhibits, awards, and contests within the profession of industrial design. To accomplish this, there are regional as well as national meetings held regularly. The VDID sponsors such events as visiting the Porsche Museum, lectures on rapid prototyping, and lecture series by well known designers. While they support many competitions, these two are specific to the VDID:

- VDID Student Design Competition
- VDID Paper AB Competition

== See also ==
- Deutscher Werkbund
