= Amalie Kärcher =

German painter

Amalie Kärcher (1819–1887) was a German painter who produced still life and flower paintings. She was born in Rüppurr and died in Karlsruhe.

She is known for works produced in Karlsruhe during the years 1846–1875.

== Gallery ==
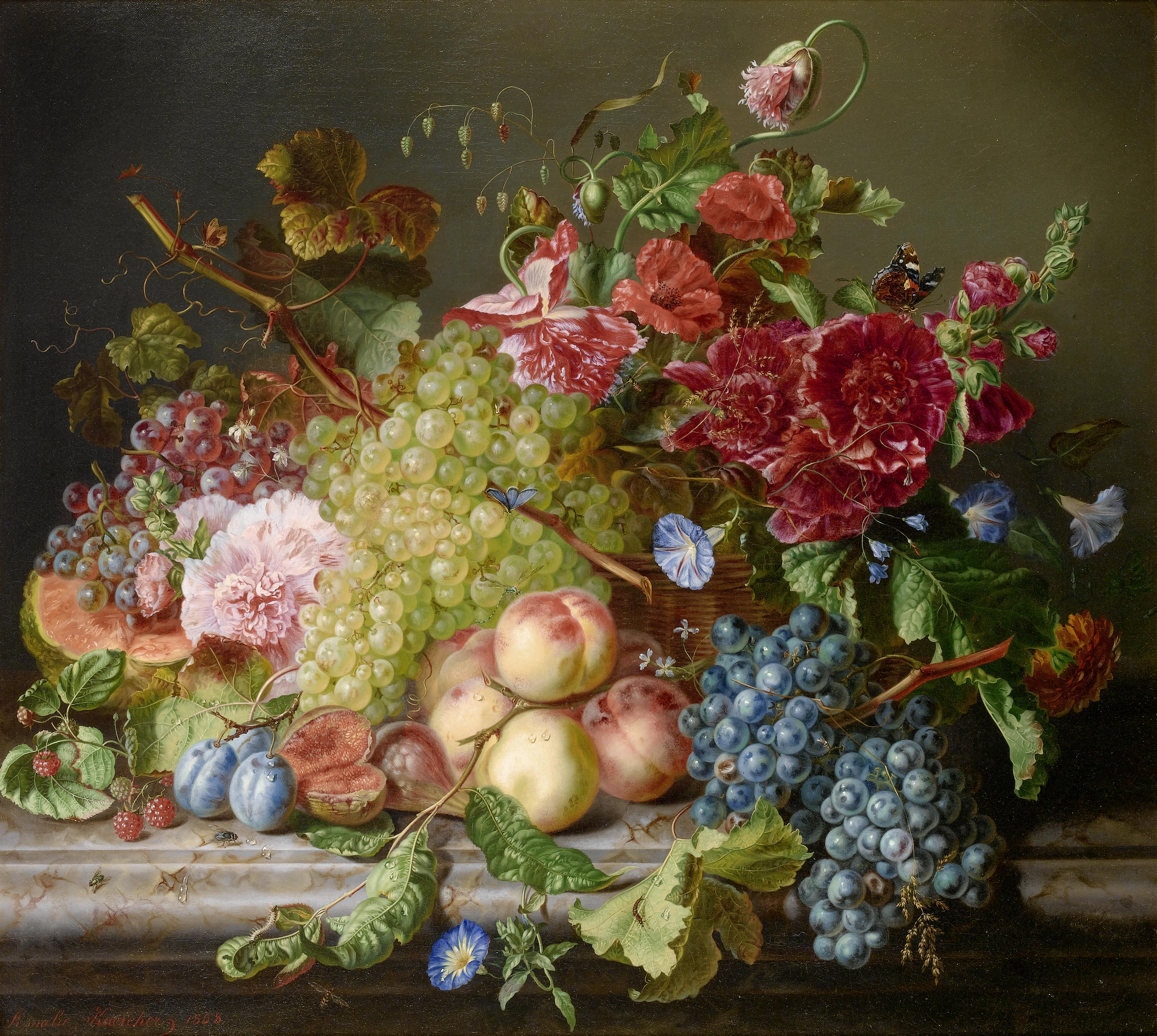
Still life with fruit and flowers on a ledge

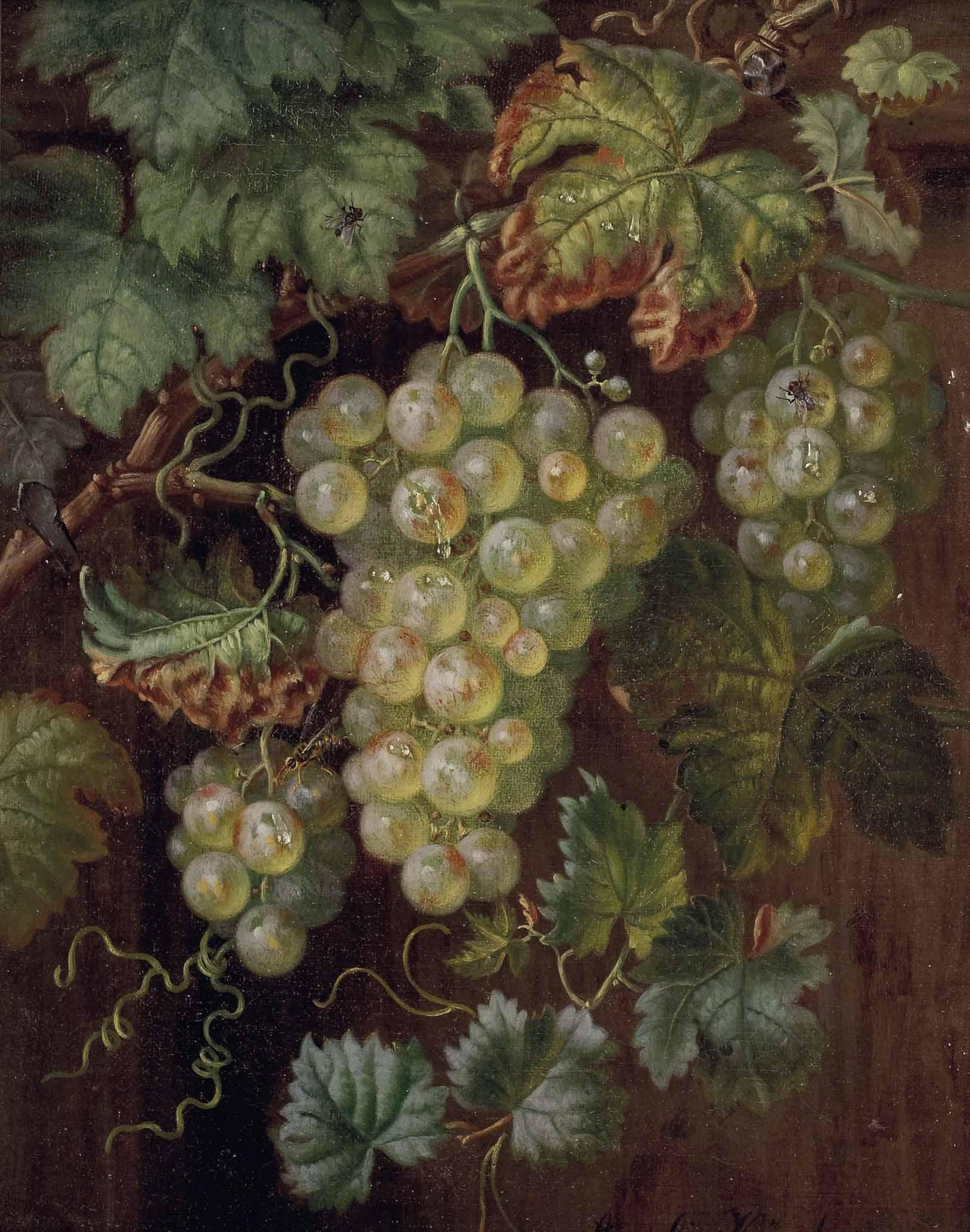
Insects on Grape

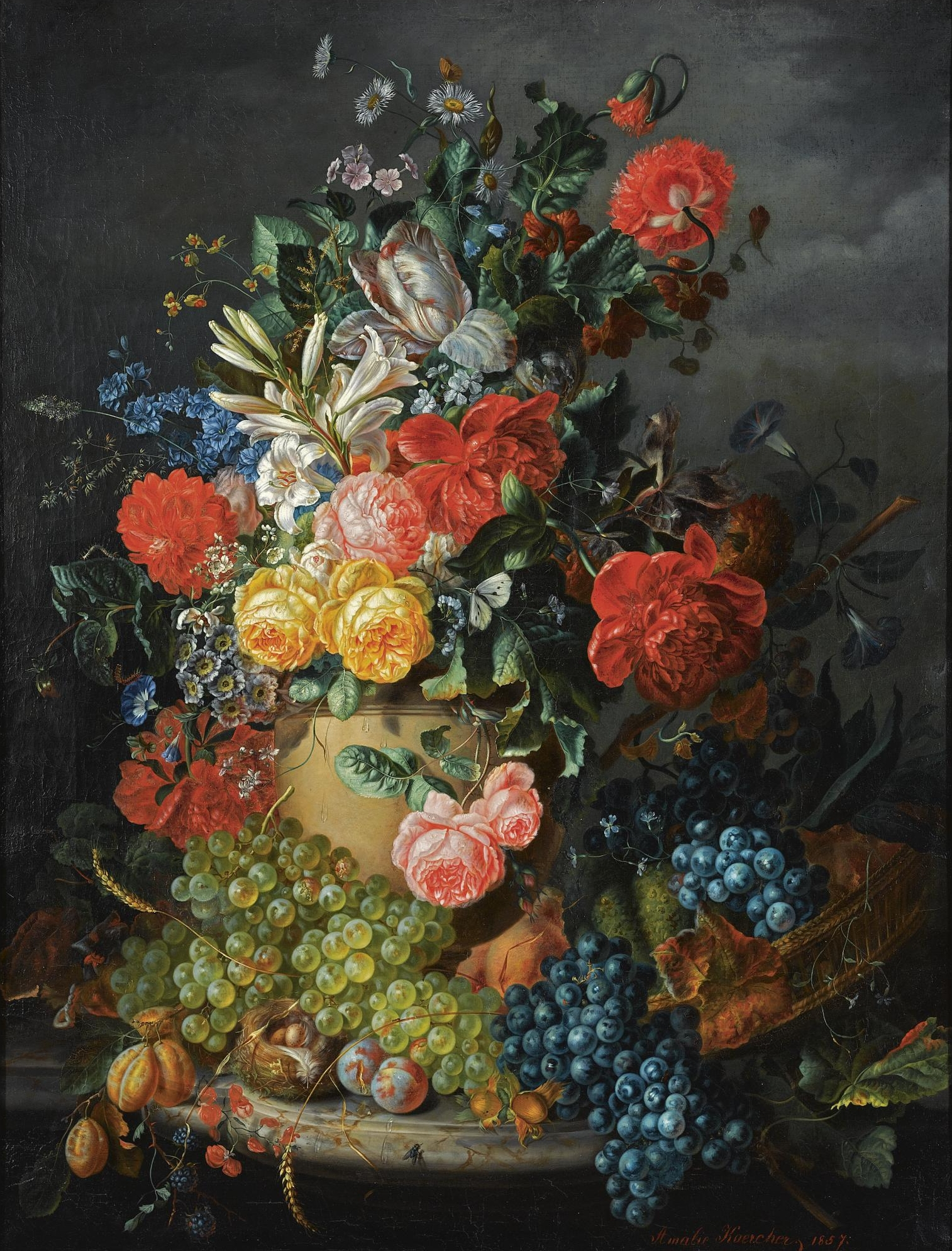
A Flower Still Life with Grapes

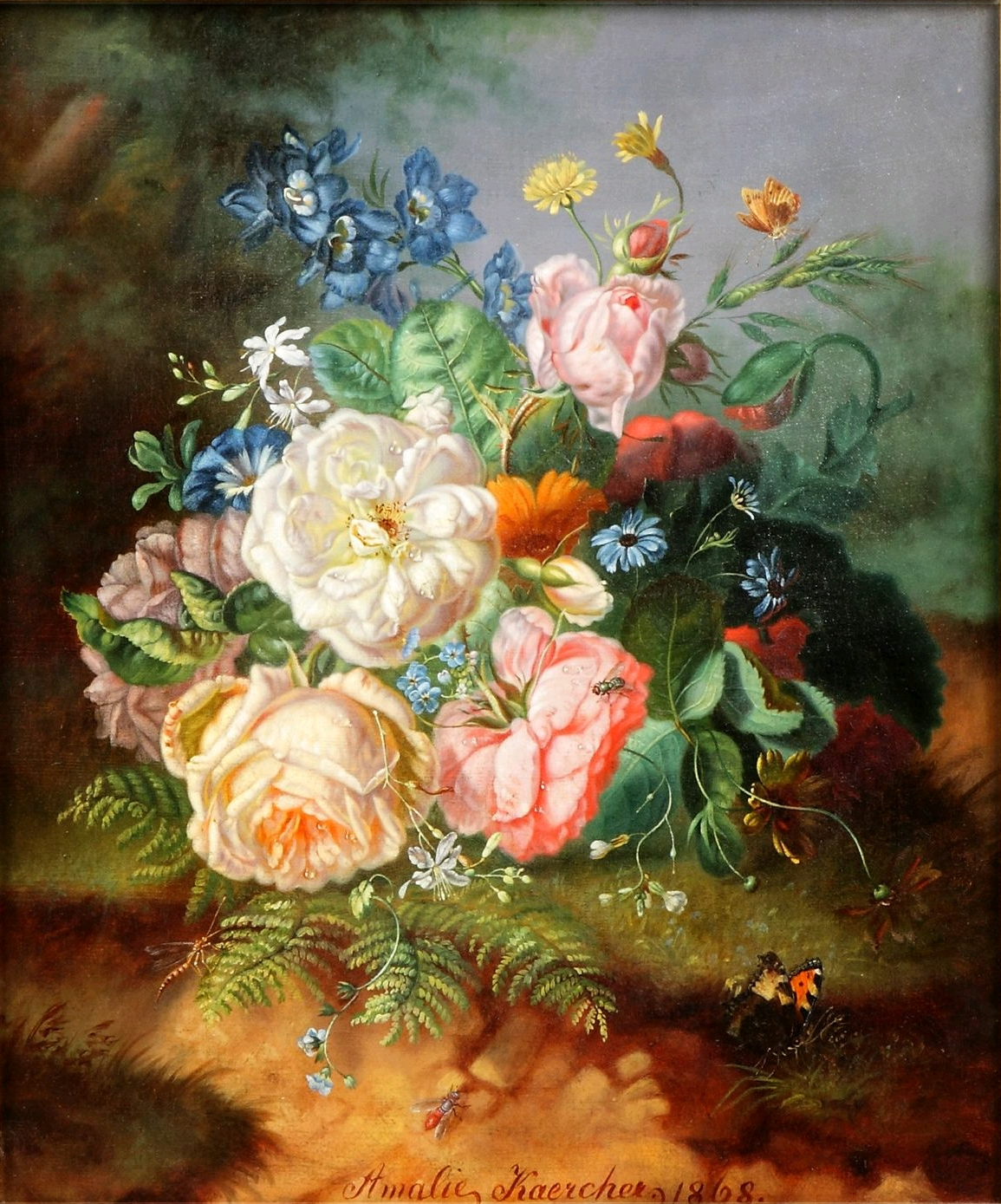
Floral still life with butterflies & insects

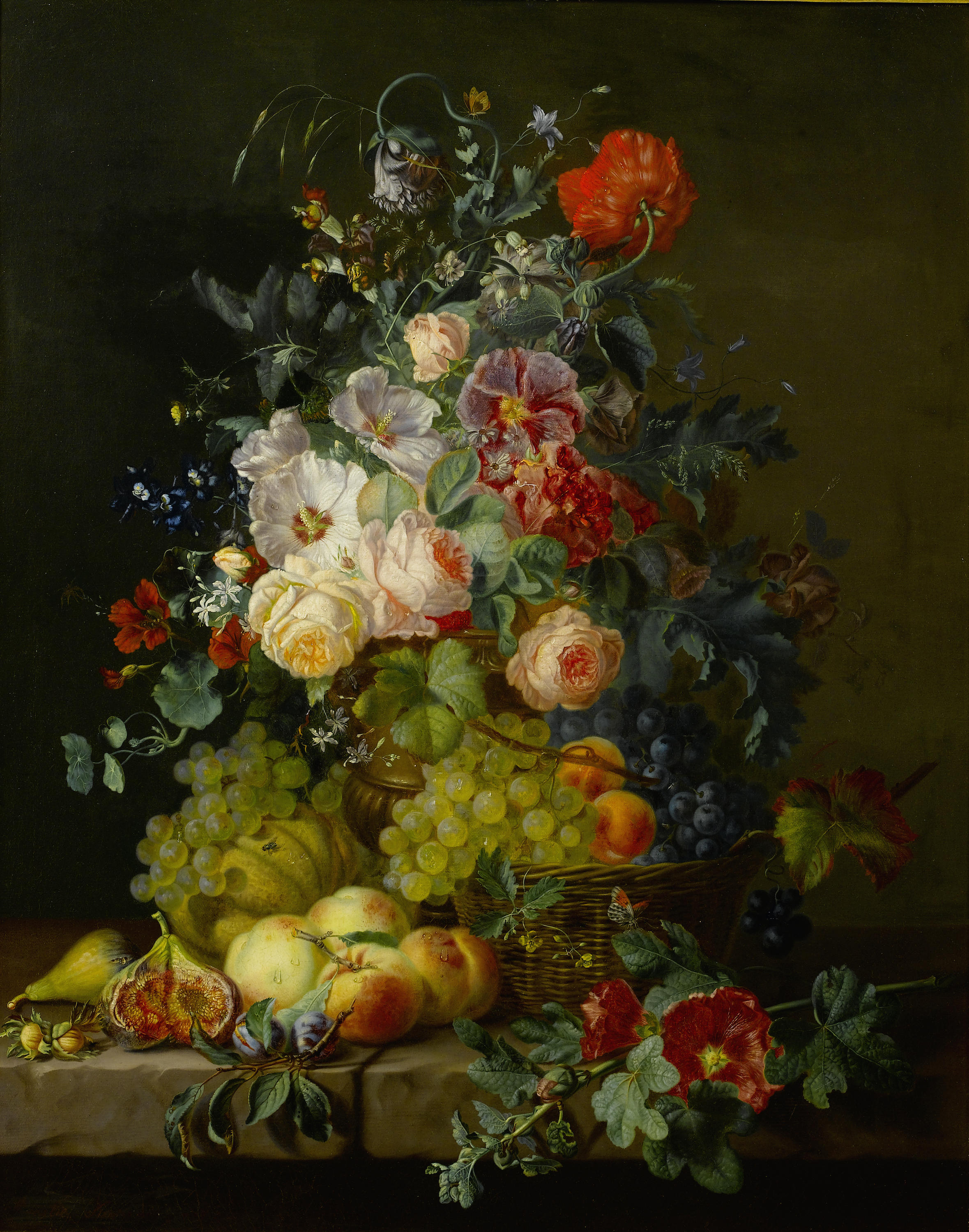
Still life with fruit and flowers on a ledge

== See also ==
- List of German women artists
