= Rintheim =

District of Karlsruhe, Germany

- Borough of Karlsruhe
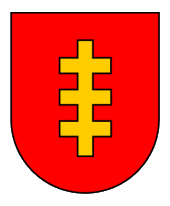
- Coat of arms

- Location of Rintheim within Karlsruhe
- Interactive map of Rintheim
- Location within Germany Location within Baden-Württemberg
- Coordinates: 49°1′N 8°27′E
- Country: Germany
- State: Baden-Württemberg
- District: Urban district
- City: Karlsruhe

Area
  - Total: 3.33 km^{2} (1.29 sq mi)
- Elevation: 115–117 m (377–384 ft)

Population (2020-01-01)
  - Total: 6,384
  - Density: 1,920/km^{2} (4,970/sq mi)
- Time zone: UTC+01:00 (CET)
  - Summer (DST): UTC+02:00 (CEST)
- Postal codes: 76131, 76139
- Dialling codes: 0721

Rintheim (German pronunciation: [ˈʁɪnthaɪm]) is a district of Karlsruhe, Germany. It is located between Hagsfeld in the north, Oststadt in the west and the Autobahn 5 in the east. The Technologiepark Karlsruhe is located in Rintheim, a center for internet and high-tech companies.

The district is further divided into Alt-Rintheim and Rintheimer Feld.

== History ==
Rintheim was first mentioned in a document on August 15, 1110, as "Rintdan". In 1275 the place became the property of the Gottesaue monastery, and after 1451 it was administered by Durlach. In 1749 a town hall was set up in Rintheim and in 1770 a school, which moved to a new school building in 1827.

The Protestant church was opened on November 5, 1871, after a year of construction. Previously, the predominantly Protestant population had to attend church services in neighboring Hagsfeld.

On January 1, 1907, Rintheim was incorporated into Karlsruhe.
