= Beiertheim-Bulach =

District of Karlsruhe, Germany

- Borough of Karlsruhe
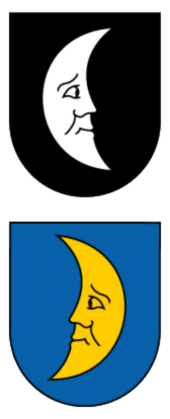
- Coat of arms

- Location of Beiertheim-Bulach within Karlsruhe
- Interactive map of Beiertheim-Bulach
- Location within Germany Location within Baden-Württemberg
- Coordinates: 48°59′N 8°23′E
- Country: Germany
- State: Baden-Württemberg
- District: Urban district
- City: Karlsruhe

Area
  - Total: 2.86 km^{2} (1.10 sq mi)
- Elevation: 112–119 m (367–390 ft)

Population (2018-12-31)
  - Total: 7,002
  - Density: 2,450/km^{2} (6,340/sq mi)
- Time zone: UTC+01:00 (CET)
  - Summer (DST): UTC+02:00 (CEST)
- Postal codes: 76135
- Dialling codes: 0721

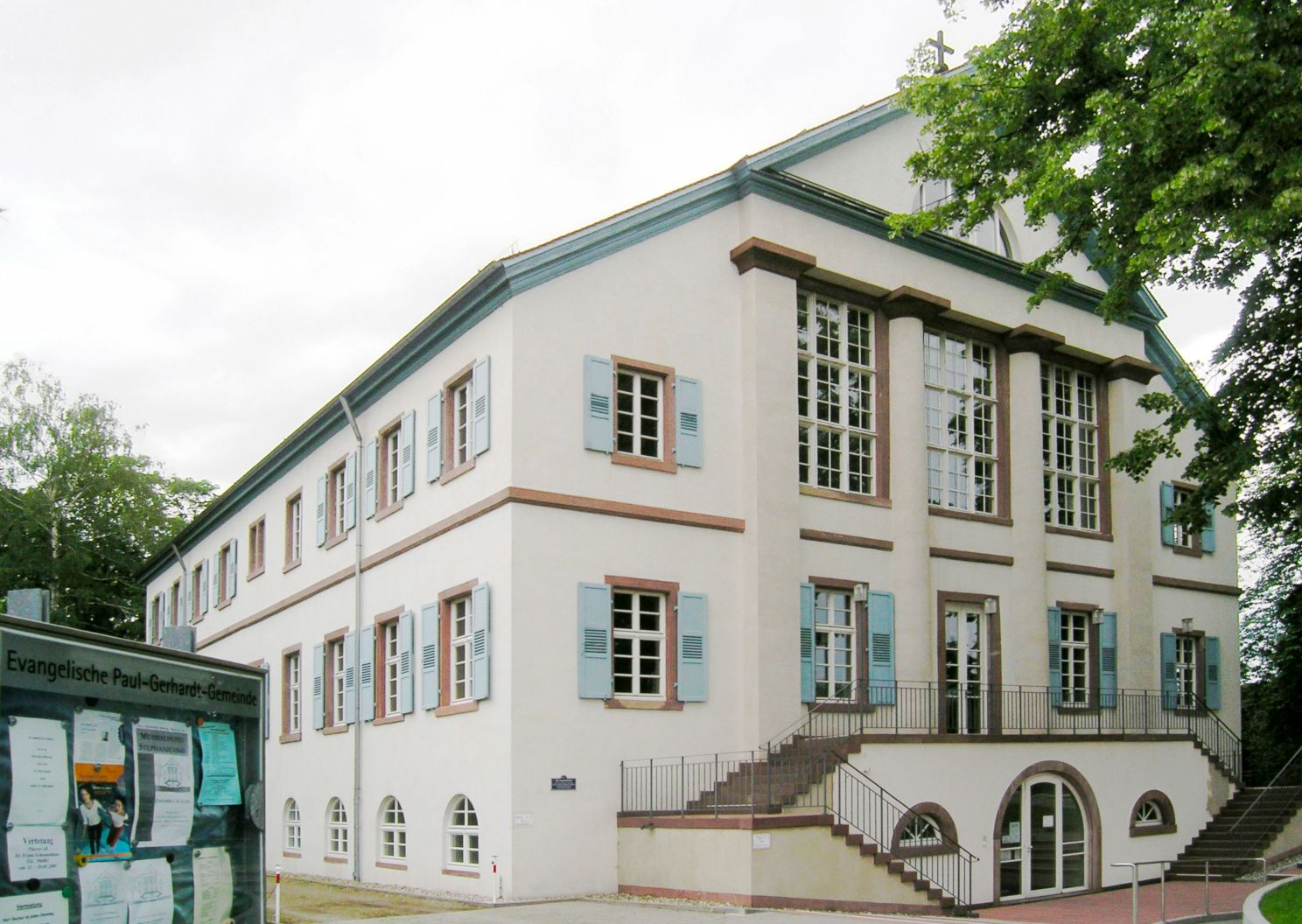
Stephanienbad

Beiertheim-Bulach is a district of Karlsruhe, Germany, between Ebertstraße, Hofgut Scheibenhardt, Oberreut and Weiherfeld-Dammerstock. It consists of the formerly independent districts of Beiertheim and Bulach, which are separated by the Alb.

== History ==
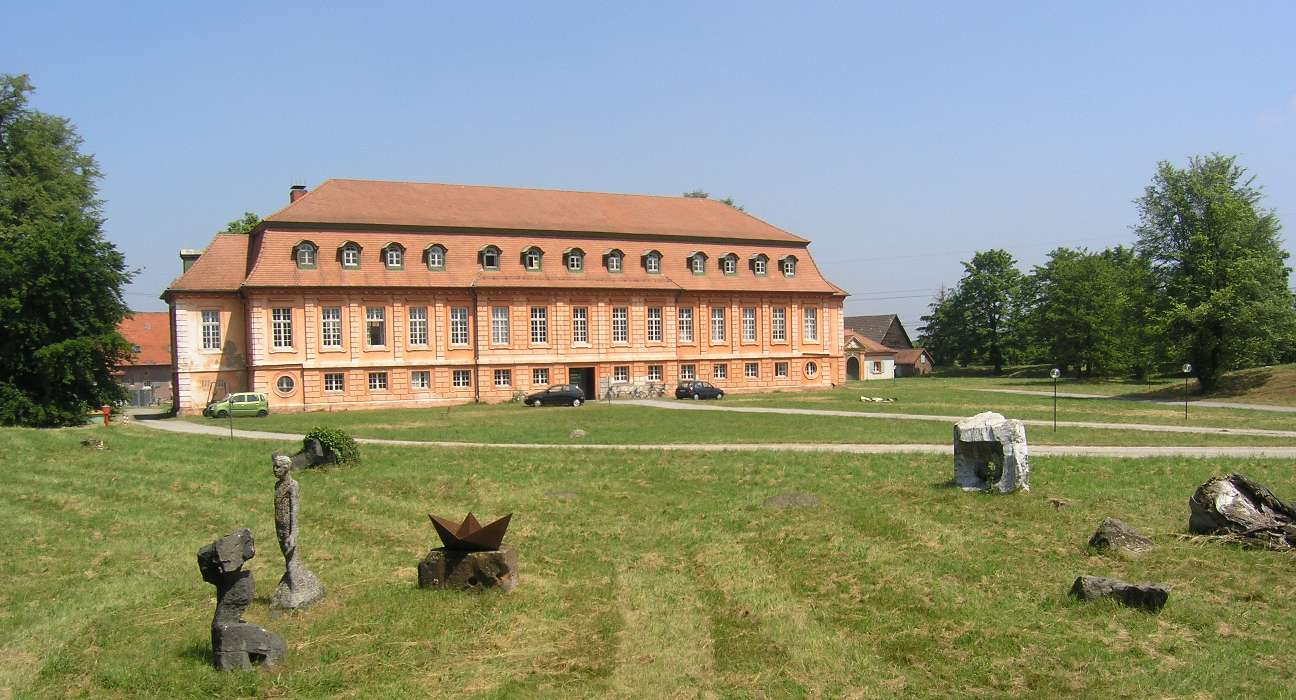
Schloss Scheibenhardt

Beiertheim was first mentioned in a document in 1110 as "Burdam" or "Burtan". The name probably comes from "Bur", meaning hut and "tan", meaning retreat or forest and was a hiding place for farmers and shepherds. Another mention is that the name is derived from "Buar", meaning "cattle place." The place was founded by the Count of Hohenberg. Bulach was first mentioned as a mill in a document dated May 18, 1193, as "Bulande". The name is derived either from "Bu", meaning beech trees and "lach", meaning damp, swampy ground or from "bu", meaning cow and "loc", meaning place. Even in the Middle Ages, both villages had a common court and a common Schultheiß.

In the 19th century, a laundry industry developed in the town and lasted until after the Second World War. The village was financially well equipped as it repeatedly sold land to the expanding city of Karlsruhe. The community used to be a lot bigger.

Beiertheim was incorporated into Karlsruhe on January 1, 1907, followed by Bulach on April 1, 1929.

Today there are, among other things, in town the Stephanienbad swimming pool building that was modified to the Paul Gerhardt church, the Hofgut Scheibenhardt estate, as well as the Catholic churches of St. Cyriakus und St. Michael with the Beiertheimer Altar by Hans Wydyz.
