= Rüppurr =

District of Karlsruhe

- Borough of Karlsruhe
- Coat of arms

- Location of Rüppurr within Karlsruhe
- Interactive map of Rüppurr
- Location within Germany Location within Baden-Württemberg
- Coordinates: 48°58′N 8°24′E
- Country: Germany
- State: Baden-Württemberg
- District: Urban district
- City: Karlsruhe

Area
  - Total: 7.0268 km^{2} (2.7131 sq mi)
- Elevation: 118 m (387 ft)

Population (2020-12-31)
  - Total: 10,864
  - Density: 1,546.1/km^{2} (4,004.3/sq mi)
- Time zone: UTC+01:00 (CET)
  - Summer (DST): UTC+02:00 (CEST)
- Postal codes: 76199
- Dialling codes: 0721

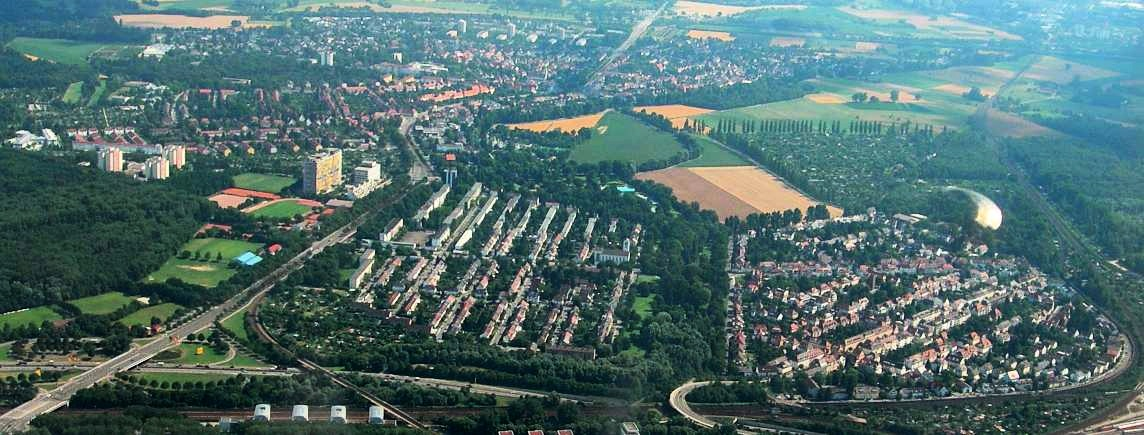
Rüppurr begins on the left at the high-rise buildings, behind it the garden city; the old town center is to the right of the main road

Rüppurr is a district in the south of Karlsruhe, Baden-Württemberg, Germany, with around 11,000 inhabitants. The district borders on the neighboring town of Ettlingen and is considered to be one of the more affluent residential areas in Karlsruhe.

The district is further divided into Alt-Rüppurr, Neu-Rüppurr, Gartenstadt and Rüppurr-Südost.

== History ==
Rüppurr was first mentioned on February 9, 1103, in a document from the Hördt monastery under the name Rietburi. The name "Rüppurr" comes from Riet-Burg = Burg im Sumpf, Das Haus im Ried (Castle in the swamp, The house in the reed/moor). Among the residents of Rüppurr, the alternative place name "Rieberg" is sometimes still in use, for example in the name of the district gazette "Rieberger Bläddle". Knight Herrmann von Spiegelberg left the monastery he founded as well as his fields in, among others, Rüppurr and Knielingen (Knodilingen) to the diocese of Speyer.

Rüppurr is a Baden village founded on the gravel deposits of the Kinzig-Murg river. A linear settlement was built between the moated castle (stonemason's mark on the Rotes Haus (Meierhof)) and a village center further south. In addition to agriculture, ice production was important for the Karlsruhe breweries.

Rüppurr is the ancestral seat of the noble family Pfauen von Rüppurr, who resided here until 1584. The Prince-Bishop of Worms Reinhard von Rüppurr (1458-1533) came from here and returned in 1525 in retirement. His heart is buried in the parish church of St. Nicholas, where there is a corresponding epitaph.

In 1907, Rüppurr was incorporated into Karlsruhe. In the same year Hans Kampffmeyer, Friedrich Ostendorf, Friedrich Ettlinger, and others founded the Gartenstadt Karlsruhe cooperative. From 1911 the first houses were built near today's Ostendorfplatz; architects like Max Laeuger worked on the planning.

From 1931, the Protestant Diakonissenanstalt established the Diakonissenkrankenhaus Rüppurr, today a central care hospital with 464 beds, 60 places for geriatric rehabilitation and 1350 employees.

The high-rise buildings of the Rüppurr residential building and the striking Rüppurrer Schloss residential complex on the northern edge of the district have Rüppurr in their name, but are actually located in the Weiherfeld-Dammerstock district.

In the Rüppurr cemetery there are some well-known personalities who have worked in Karlsruhe and around the world.

== Traffic ==
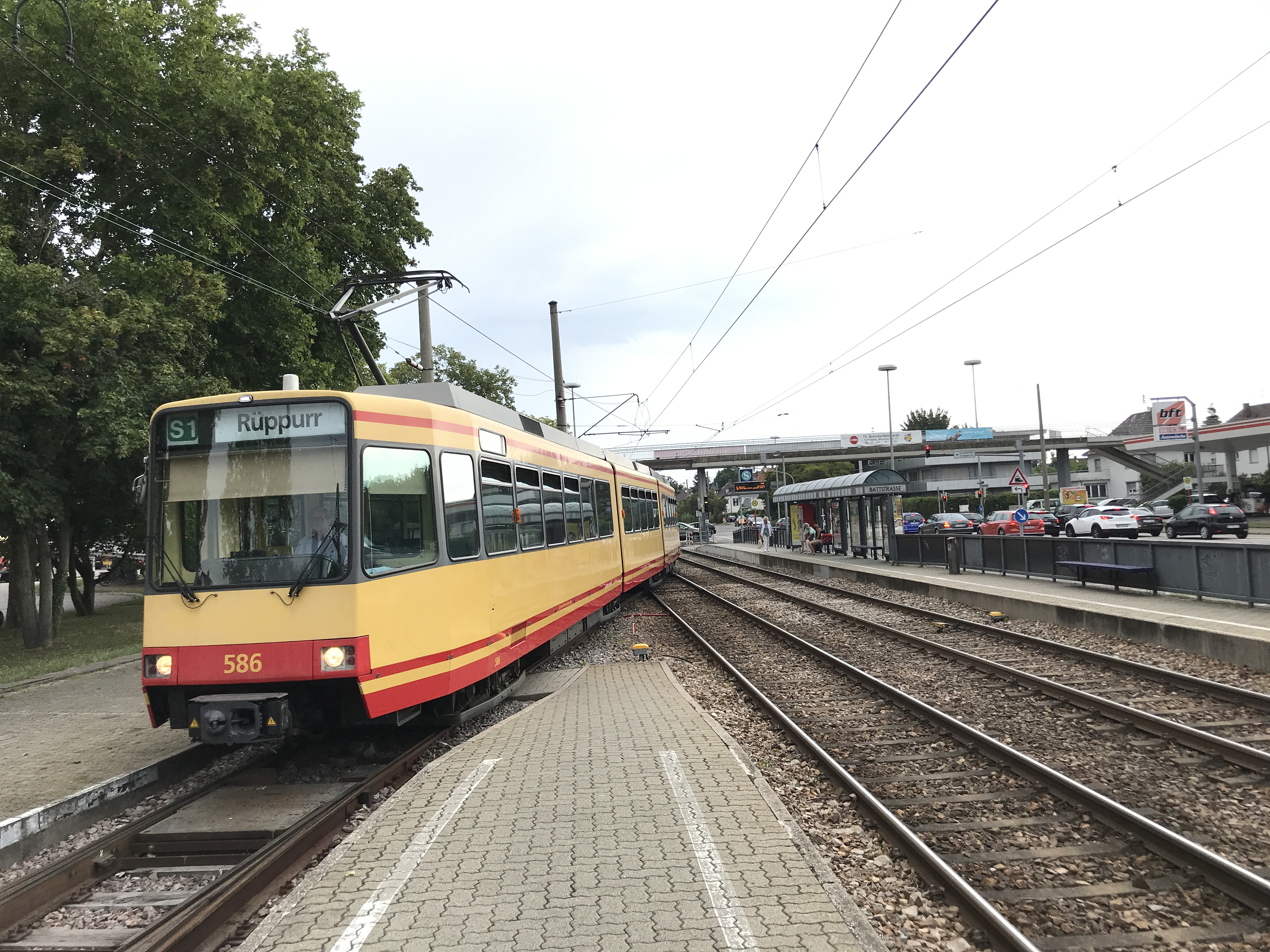
S1 at the tram stop Rüppurr Battstrasse

=== Road traffic ===
Despite the quiet residential area, Rüppurr has very good transport links. The main street is Herrenalber Straße, running in north-south direction, which separates the town into the older western and newer eastern parts and connects the Karlsruhe city center with Ettlingen. At its southern end, on the border with Ettlingen, there is the motorway junction "Ettlingen - Bad Herrenalb - Karlsruhe Rüppurr" of the Bundesautobahn 5. At its northern end, Herrenalber Strasse connects to the southern bypass, which is Karlsruhe's main traffic artery in an east-west direction represents.

=== Rail traffic ===
From 1844 until the relocation of the Karlsruhe main train station in 1913, there was a train station on the Badische Hauptbahn west of the town. In 1897 the Albtalbahn (Alb Valley Railway) was built on the eastern edge of the former place. Later the place expanded on the eastern side of this route. Therefore the Albtalbahn, which is used today by the tram lines S1 and S11, has the stops Battstraße, Tulpenstraße, Ostendorfplatz, and Schloss Rüppurr, along Herrenalber Straße today through the center of the village. By train you can reach Karlsruhe Hauptbahnhof in 5 minutes and the Marktplatz in Karlsruhe city center in 15 minutes.

== Tourist attractions ==
On the roof of the Max-Planck-Gymnasium is the Volkssternwarte Karlsruhe, built in 1957, which houses a historical telescope from 1859. The public observatory regularly offers public observations of the sky and astronomical lectures. However, only the Rote Haus, which was recently renovated, and the old watermill on the Alb are all that remain of the Rüppurrer Schloss. The rest of the former castle area is used as a parking lot for e.g. the Mostfest (Oktoberfest) used.

The Protestant Auferstehungskirche (Church of the Resurrection), built in 1907 in the neo-baroque style, is located in the center of Rüppurr. In the adjoining area is the Rüppurr cemetery, which is laid out as a park cemetery.

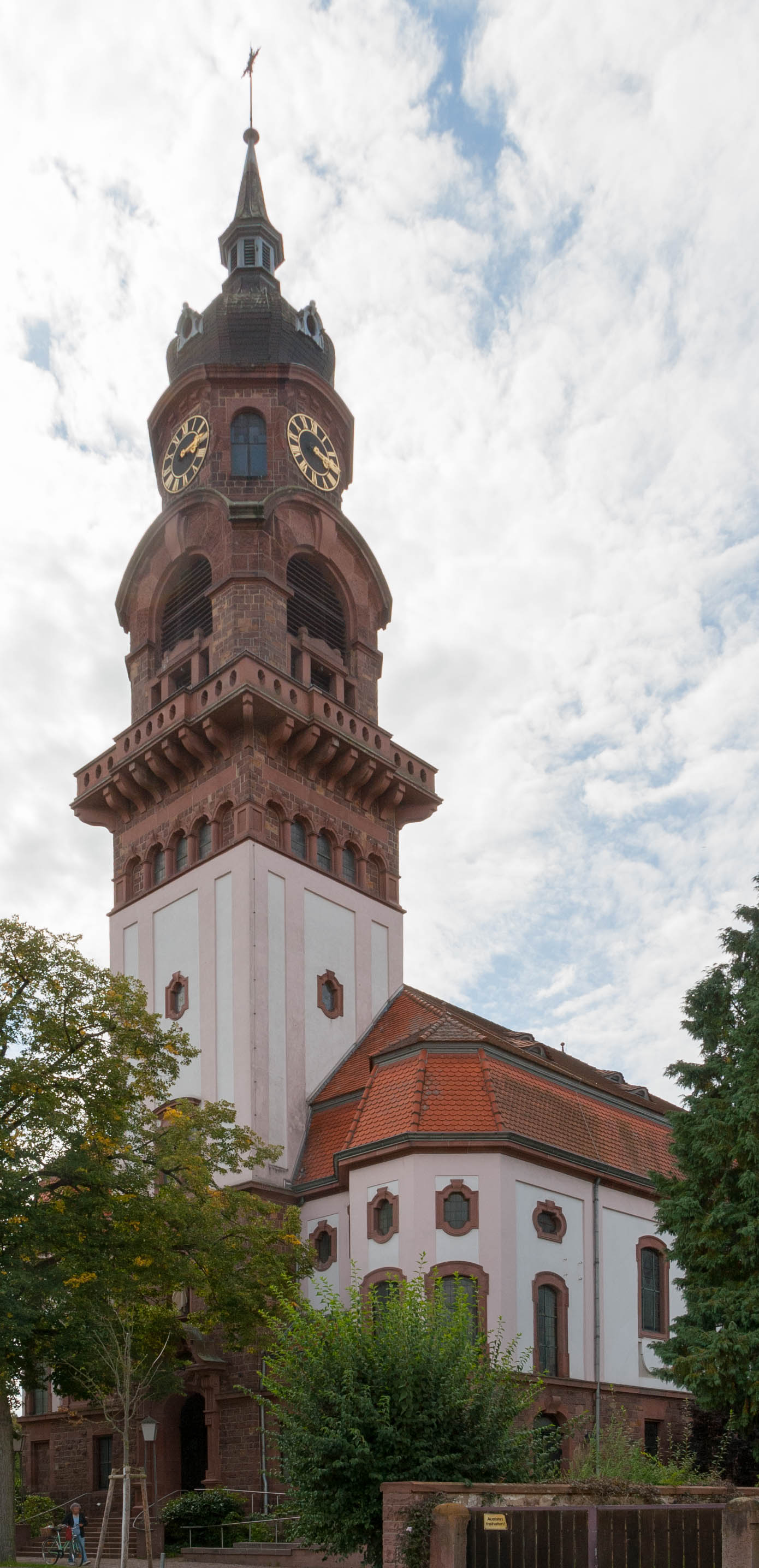
Protestant Auferstehungskirche

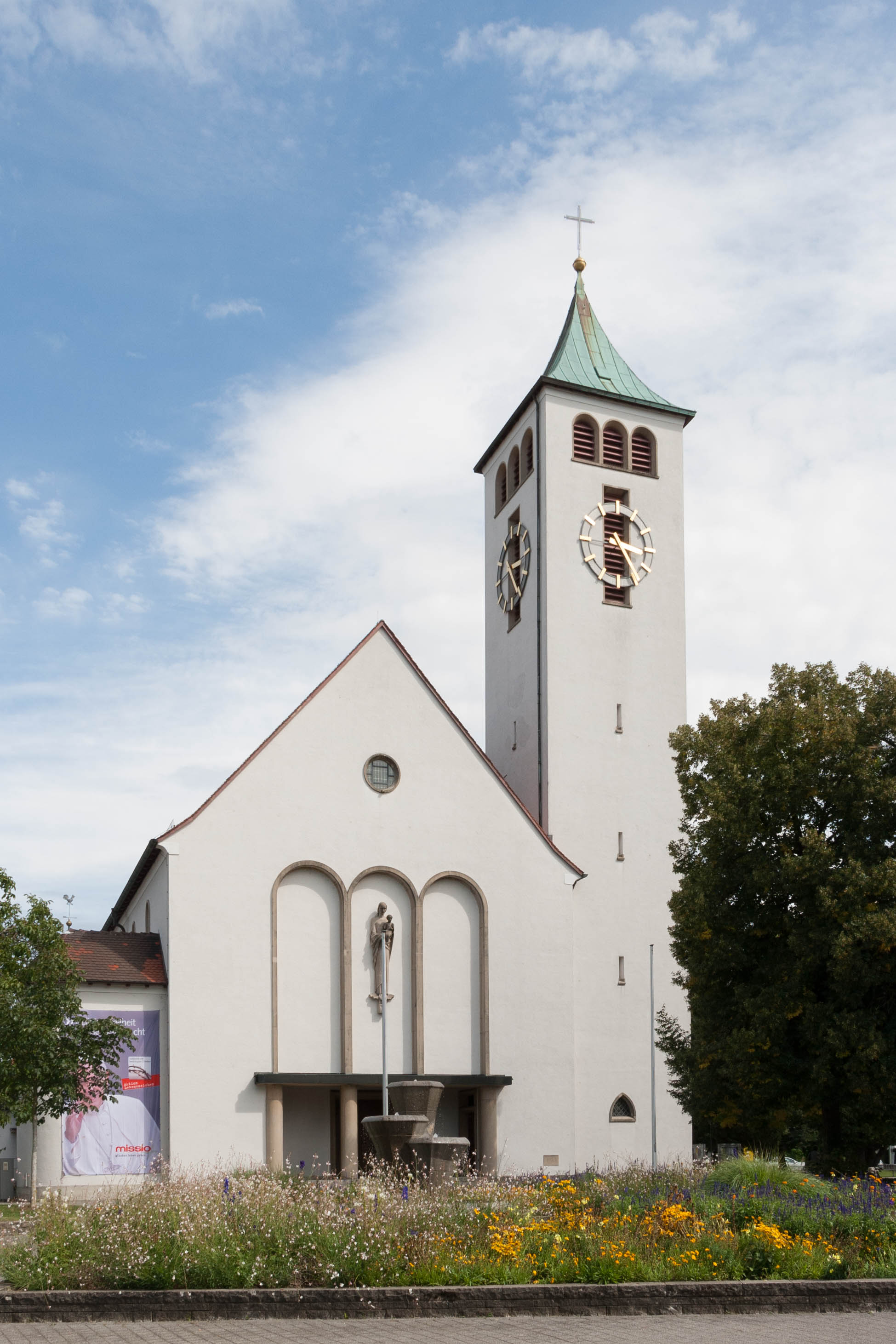
Catholic Christkönigkirche

== Notable people ==
- Amalie Kärcher (1819–1887), Painter
- Wolf Wondratschek (* 1943), grew up in Rüppurr
