= Südstadt (Karlsruhe) =

District of Karlsruhe

- Borough of Karlsruhe
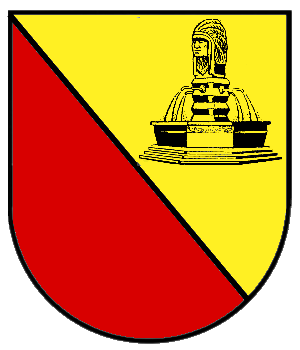
- Coat of arms

- Location of Südstadt within Karlsruhe
- Interactive map of Südstadt
- Location within Germany Location within Baden-Württemberg
- Coordinates: 49°0′N 8°24′E
- Country: Germany
- State: Baden-Württemberg
- District: Urban district
- City: Karlsruhe

Area
  - Total: 2.2049 km^{2} (0.8513 sq mi)

Population (2014-06-30)
  - Total: 18,613
  - Density: 8,441.7/km^{2} (21,864/sq mi)
- Time zone: UTC+01:00 (CET)
  - Summer (DST): UTC+02:00 (CEST)
- Postal codes: 76137
- Dialling codes: 0721

Südstadt (German pronunciation: [ˈzyːtˌʃtat], lit. 'south city') is a borough of Karlsruhe between Oststadt and the main train station.

== History ==
When the first train station in the city of Karlsruhe was inaugurated on April 1, 1843, a railway workers' settlement was formed on the site of the former "Augärten" (meaning floodplain gardens). On March 13, 1857, the city presented a development plan that envisaged a southern expansion of the city. In this context, the first workers' housing was built in 1858 and then finally the first street in the so-called "Bahnhofsviertel" was built in 1860. From 1849 to 1997, there was a repair shop of the Grand Duchy of Baden State Railway in the southern part of the borough.

The so-called Bahnhofsviertel (station district) had to contend with numerous problems. The railway tracks cut off the southern part of the city from the rest of the city, as there were only three railway crossings, which were increasingly closed due to the increasing traffic. Plans to build a tunnel were abandoned because the costs were too high and a bridge was built, but the steep gradient meant that horse-drawn carts could not cross the bridge. The smoke pollution from the steam locomotives was no longer acceptable. As traffic continued to increase and a major extension of the tracks became necessary, the station was finally moved south in 1913. The former route is now home to the Badisches Staatstheater Karlsruhe and the administrative building of the former Oberpostdirektion Karlsruhe. In addition to the traffic problems, the living conditions of the population in the tenement blocks were poor. In 1897, there was only 16 square meters of living space per person, compared to 30 square meters in the rest of the city.
