= Wolfartsweier =

- Borough of Karlsruhe
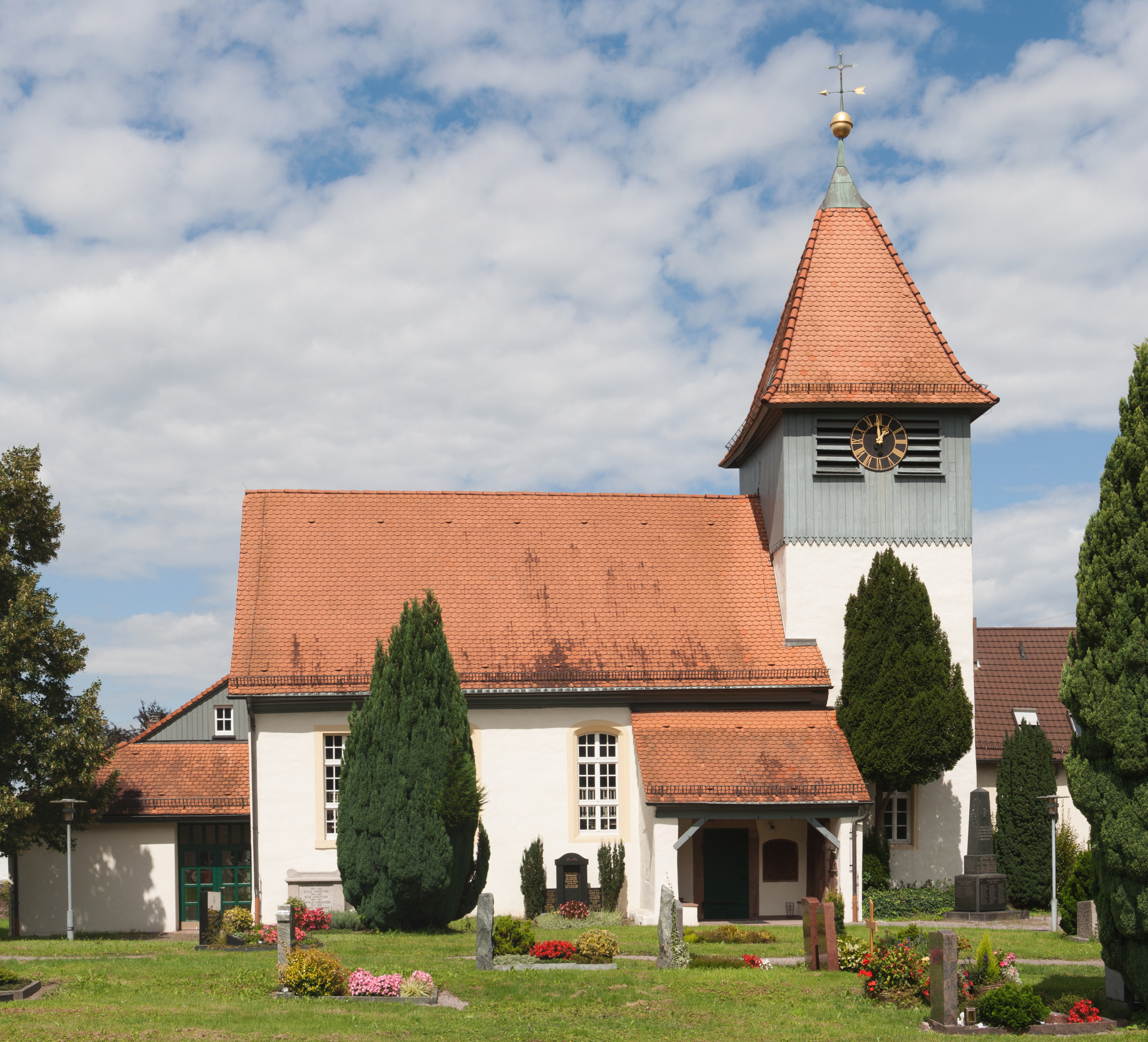
- Protestant church of Wolfartsweier

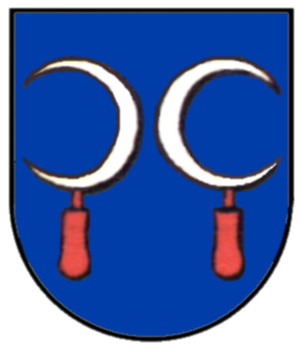
- Coat of arms

- Location of Wolfartsweier in Karlsruhe
- Interactive map of Wolfartsweier
- Location within Germany Location within Baden-Württemberg
- Coordinates: 48°58′28″N 8°27′13″E
- Country: Germany
- State: Baden-Württemberg
- Admin. region: Karlsruhe
- District: Urban district
- City: Karlsruhe

Area
  - Total: 2.0058 km^{2} (0.7744 sq mi)

Population (2020-12-31)
  - Total: 3,068
  - Density: 1,530/km^{2} (3,962/sq mi)
- Time zone: UTC+01:00 (CET)
  - Summer (DST): UTC+02:00 (CEST)
- Postal codes: 76228
- Dialling codes: 0721

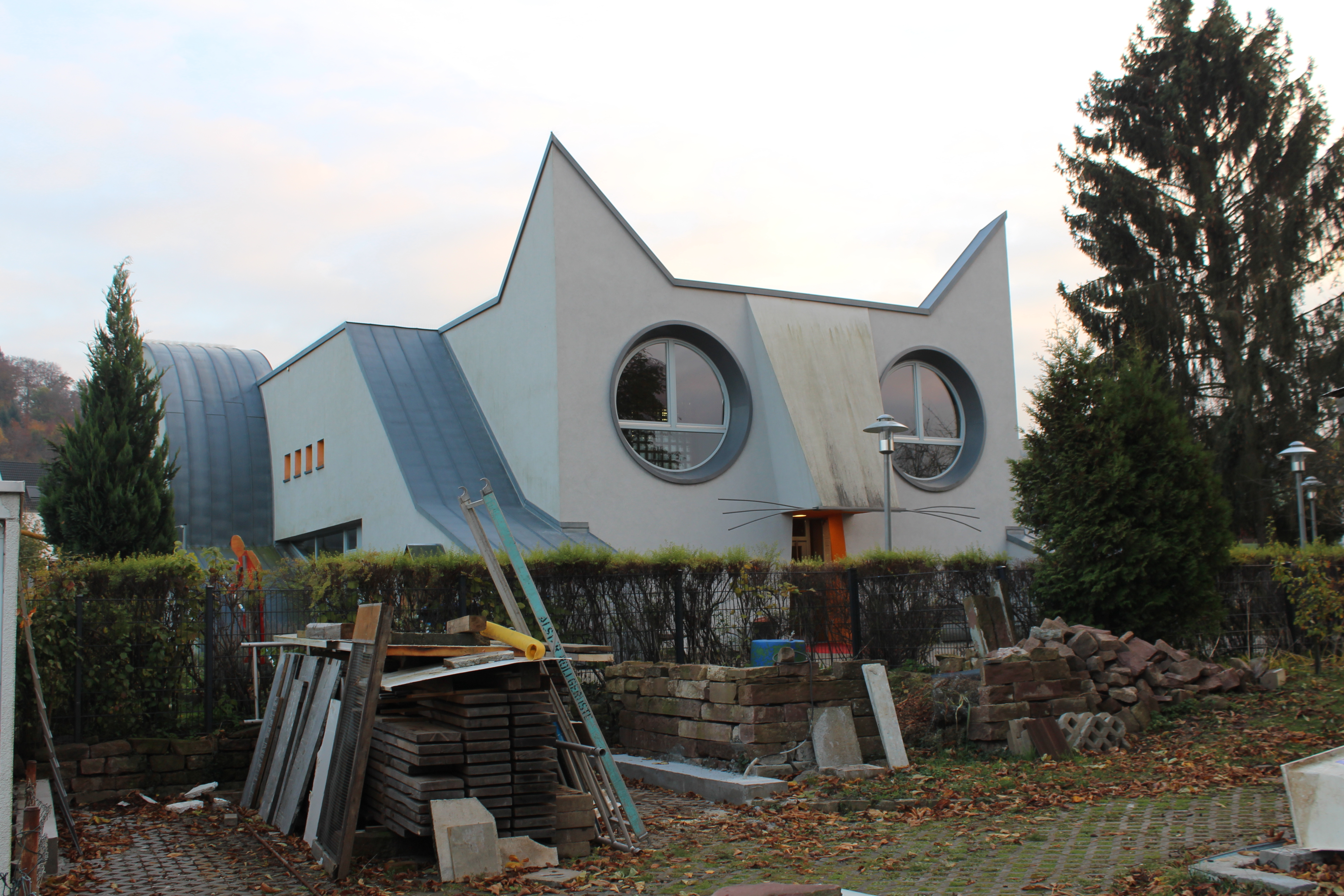
Katzenkindergarten

Wolfartsweier is a village and a quarter of Karlsruhe, Baden-Württemberg, Germany. Its population is 3,068 (2020). It was first mentioned in 1261 AD under the name of "Wolvoldeswilere". The local church was first mentioned in 1329. A small creek, called Wettersbach, runs through the village, but in an underground canal for most of its way. Wolfartsweier has a town hall, a Protestant and a Catholic church and community centres, and a public outdoor swimming pool.

In 2002, a new creche, the "Katzenkindergarten", was built in the shape of a lying cat. (Architect Ayla Yöndel / Idea and concept Tomi Ungerer)

Wolfartsweier lost its independence in 1973 when it became part of Karlsruhe.
