= Grötzingen =

District of Karlsruhe, Germany

- Borough of Karlsruhe
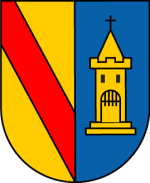
- Coat of arms

- Location of Grötzingen within Karlsruhe
- Interactive map of Grötzingen
- Location within Germany Location within Baden-Württemberg
- Coordinates: 49°00′34″N 08°29′44″E
- Country: Germany
- State: Baden-Württemberg
- District: Urban district
- City: Karlsruhe

Area
  - Total: 11.3358 km^{2} (4.3768 sq mi)

Population (2020-12-31)
  - Total: 9,156
  - Density: 807.7/km^{2} (2,092/sq mi)
- Time zone: UTC+01:00 (CET)
  - Summer (DST): UTC+02:00 (CEST)
- Postal codes: 76229
- Dialling codes: 0721

Grötzingen is a district in Karlsruhe, Germany. On December 31, 2020, it had a population of 9,156. It contains the Augustenburg Castle church and the Grötzingen Jewish Cemetery. Pfinztal lies just to the southeast.

The district is further divided into Nördlich der Pfinz and Südlich der Pfinz.
