= Waldstadt (Karlsruhe) =

District of Karlsruhe

- Borough of Karlsruhe
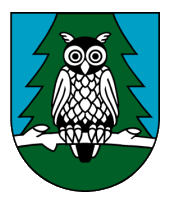
- Coat of arms

- Location of Waldstadt within Karlsruhe
- Interactive map of Waldstadt
- Location within Germany Location within Baden-Württemberg
- Coordinates: 49°02′N 8°26′E
- Country: Germany
- State: Baden-Württemberg
- District: Urban district
- City: Karlsruhe

Area
  - Total: 10.3538 km^{2} (3.9976 sq mi)
- Elevation: 1,221 m (4,006 ft)

Population (2020-12-31)
  - Total: 12,211
  - Density: 1,179.4/km^{2} (3,054.6/sq mi)
- Time zone: UTC+01:00 (CET)
  - Summer (DST): UTC+02:00 (CEST)
- Postal codes: 76139
- Dialling codes: 0721

Waldstadt is a district of Karlsruhe. The district was built in 1957 as a new residential area in the Hardtwald in the north of the Karlsruhe city center. As of 2020, around 12,200 people live in Waldstadt.

The district is further divided into Waldlage and Feldlage, which was added in 1970.

== History ==
The idea for the district had the former Lord Mayor Günther Klotz in 1957, since there were not enough homes in the post-war period and the city was looking for new solutions for homeless people.

The district was first referred to as Arbeitslosenwald ("forest of the unemployed"), as there were many more unemployed people as in other districts. In 1963, 8264 inhabitants were registered in 2374 residential units. In addition to large rental apartments, numerous single-family and terraced houses were created, so that a mixed population resulted from different income groups. Through the aging and the death of many owners of the starting time, a change of the residency level results above all in the large block of flats.

In the 1970s, Waldstadt in the east was supplemented by the construction area Feldlage, with the settlement of the Europäische Schule in Karlsruhe, Waldstadt was further expanded around the Europasiedlung.

== Economy and Infrastructure ==
Initially, the infrastructure lagged behind the construction of residential buildings. Meanwhile, Waldstadt has a good infrastructure with seven kindergartens, five schools, three churches, three student dorms and two retirement homes. In the cultural sector there is the Waldstadt Kammerorchester, the Waldstadtchor and the semiprofessional theatre Die Käuze. Restaurants, cafes, or pubs are only a few available. There are also (due to the lack of commercial areas) only a few workplaces. As a result, Waldstadt is still a commuter town.

=== Sports ===
Numerous sports are offered in the Traugott-Bender-Sportpark. There is also the Fächerbad in the south of Waldstadt, a sports and leisure pool.

=== Traffic ===
Waldstadt is connected to the Karlsruhe city center with tram line 4, which passes from the Hauptbahnhof via the Durlacher Tor to the Europäische Schule. The line runs over the downtown and thus covers the eastern part. The part of the city which is in the forest and thus the western edge is served by the bus line 30 and also connects them with the Durlacher Tor.

Car traffic for the forest part is handled by the Theodor-Heuss-Allee, which runs in the west of Waldstadt. The access to the downtown takes place via the Gustav-Heinemann-Allee in the east. Through this concept, the through traffic in Waldstadt is minimized, but at the same time a drive from the part in the forest into the downtown (where the supply center is) connected with a detour.

=== Judiciary ===
In the Rintheimer Querallee has been an avoidance seat of the Bundesgerichtshof since 2019. There, the four Strafsenate in Karlsruhe are housed, as well as part of the administration. The former building of the General-Kammhuber barracks was already a service center of the Bundesverfassungsgericht from 2011 to 2015 during his refurbishment.
