= Black Forest North Perimeter Way =

Hiking trail in Germany

- Length: 55 km
- Location: Germany, Baden-Württemberg, Black Forest
- Trailheads: Mühlacker; Durlach
- Use: Hiking trail
- Difficulty: easy
- Waymark: white diamond with stylised “n” on yellow background Waymark
- Maintained by: Black Forest Club

The Black Forest North Perimeter Way (German: Schwarzwald-North Perimeter Way) is a 55-kilometre-long hiking trail in three stages running from Mühlacker to Karlsruhe-Durlach in Germany.

== History ==
The northernmost east-west route of the Black Forest Club was opened in 1980. In May 2006 it was re-opened with a different route and waymarks along its entire length. Hitherto it had followed the access paths of the Westweg via the Schwanner Warte.

== Short description ==
From its start point at Mühlacker the route runs via Öschelbronn and Eutingen an der Enz to the northern edge of the borough of Pforzheim. Passing the Wallberg it leads through very varied, open countryside to Ellmendingen, Dietenhausen and Langensteinbach. Via Thomashof and Turmberg the end point of Karlsruhe-Durlach is reached.

== Day tours/stages ==
=== First Stage: Mühlacker – Pforzheim ===
==== Overview ====
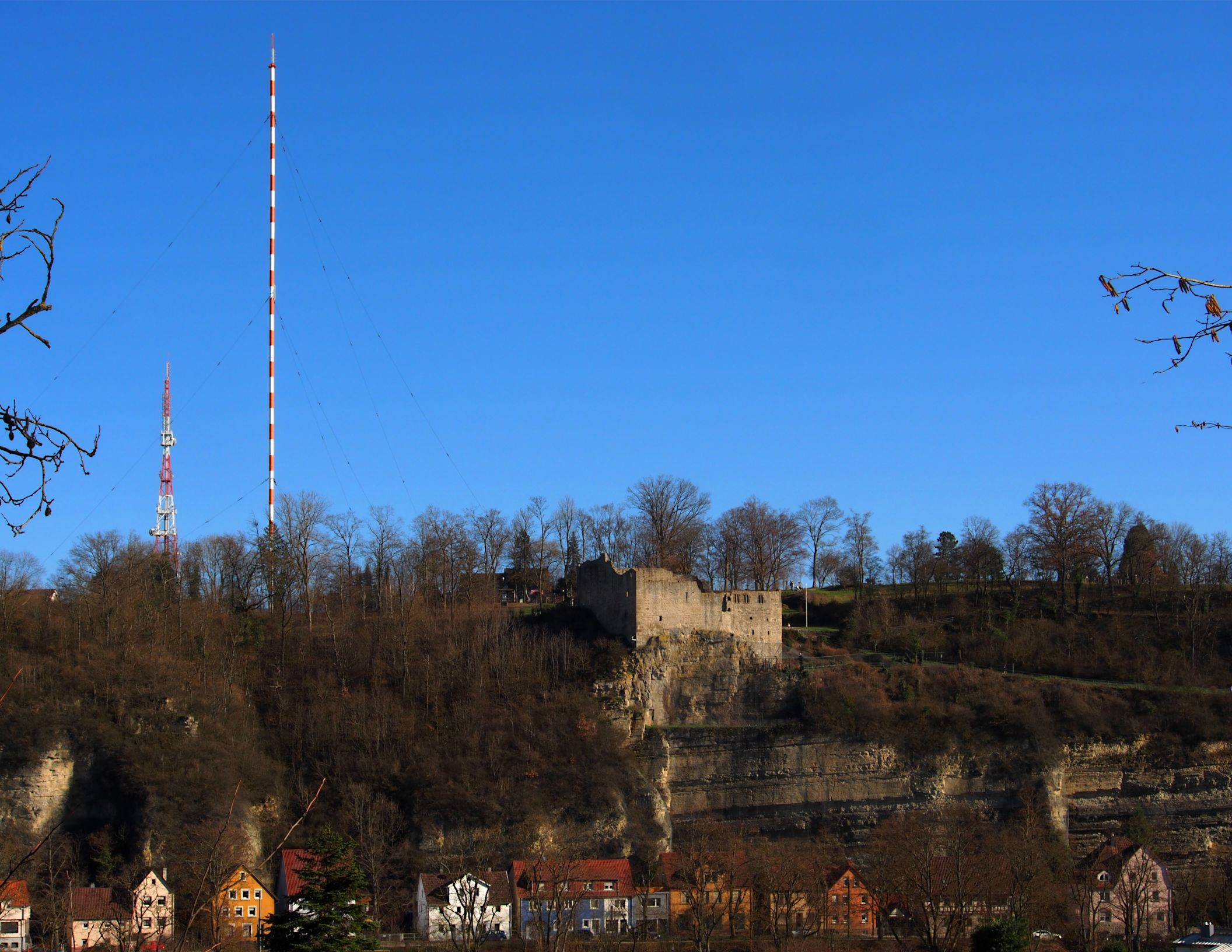
The ruins of Löffelstelz above the Enz at Dürrmenz

- Distance: 21 km

Place/Attraction	Route (km)	Height (m above NHN)	Further information
Mühlacker	0	225	Waymarked from the station
Ruins of Löffelstelz Castle	1.5	280	
Öschelbronn	7.5	240	
Eutingen an der Enz	8.0	261	Railway station
Wartberg	2.0	375	Watchtower
Pforzheim	2.0	318	1.2 km to the Central Station

==== Route description ====
Initially the der North Perimeter Way follows the Gäurand Way via the ruins of Löffelstelz to the south and the Eppingen Lines Way to Öschelbronn. After the Waldschanz with its replica of a chartaque it crosses the A 8 motorway. The way descends into the Enz valley to Eutingen and up the opposite side again to the Wartberg. After running along a ridgeway with extensive views it reaches the town of Pforzheim.

=== Second Stage: Pforzheim – Langensteinbach ===
==== Overview ====
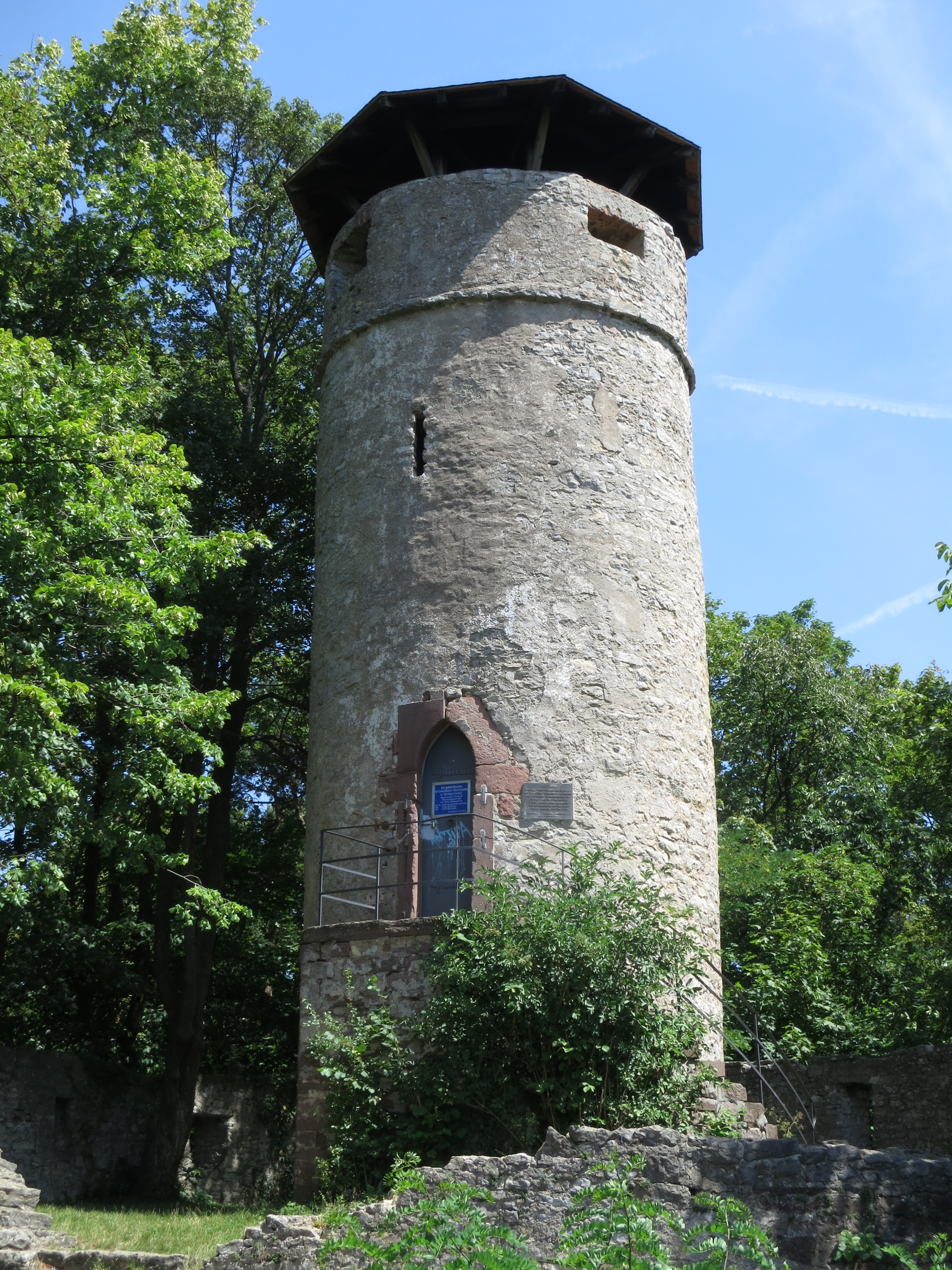
Watchtower in Pforzheim

- Distance: 19.5 km

Place/Attraction	Route (km)	Height (m above NHN)	Further information
Pforzheim	0	318	1.2 km from the Central Station
Wallberg	3;0	370	Rubble hill with memorial
Ellmendingen	7,5	187	Historical Kelter with local history museum
Dietenhausen	2,5	192	Added after the change of route
Langensteinbach	6,5	244	Ruins of Langensteinbach Castle, railway station

==== Route description ====
From Pforzheim the route runs over the Wilferdingen Heights and passes below the Wallberg. The way next crosses open country through the vineyards of Dietlingen heading for Ellmendingen. At the Dietenhäuser Mühle (mill) it crosses the Pfinz valley. Leading through scattered orchards and woods the path reaches Langensteinbach.

=== Third Stage: Langensteinbach – Karlsruhe-Durlach ===
==== Overview ====
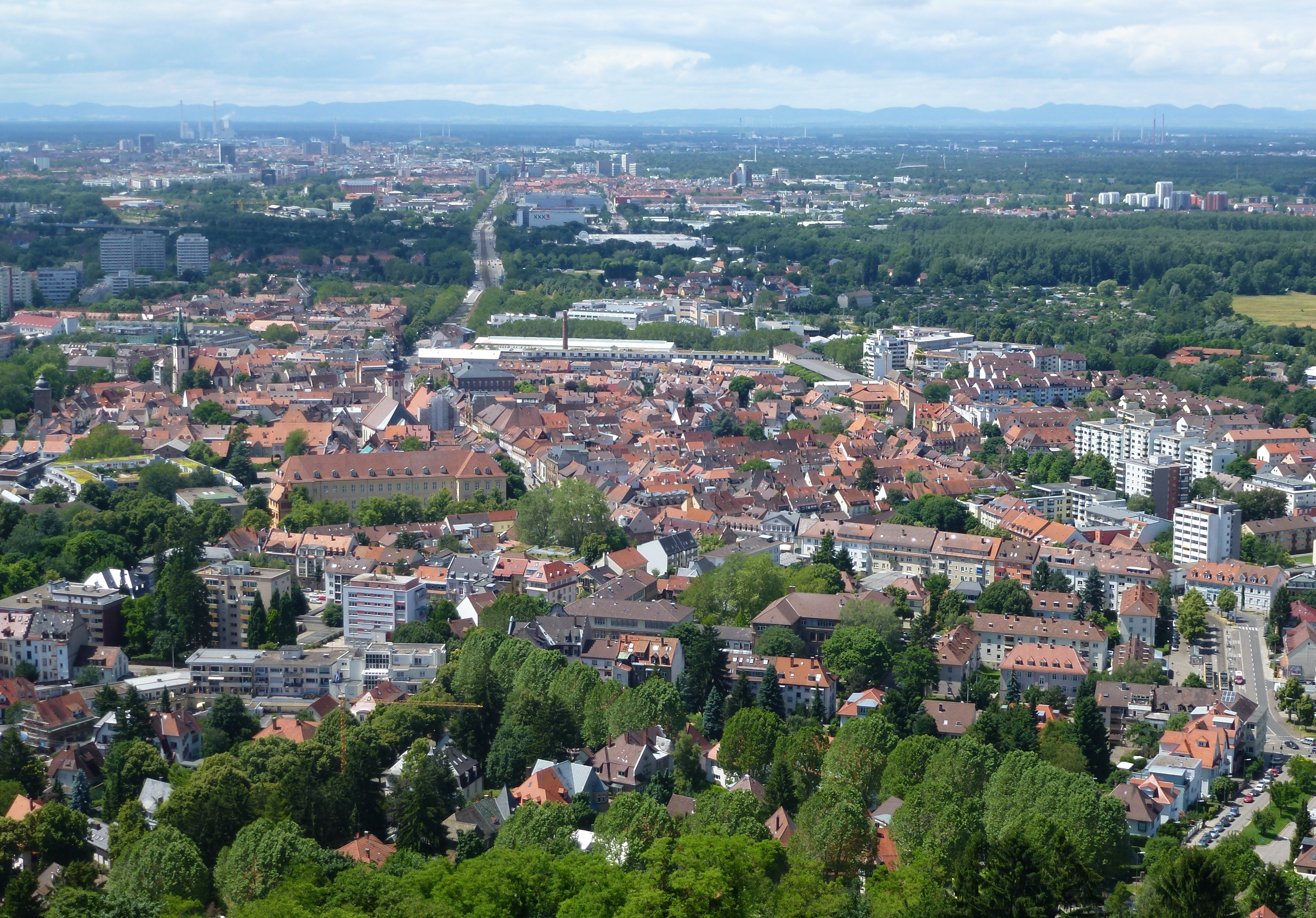
View of Karlsruhe from the Turmberg

- Distance: 14.3 km

Place/Attraction	Route (km)	Height (m above NHN)	Further information
Langensteinbach	0	244	Chapel of St. Barbara, railway station
Thomashof	9.5	264	
Turmberg	4.0	232	Turmbergbahn
Karlsruhe-Durlach	0.8	133	Tram, KA-Durlach station

==== Route description ====
One kilometre southwest of the town hall, on the edge of the town, is the Chapel of St. Barbara and Langensteinbach Castle. From Langensteinbach Town Hall the route runs in the direction of the A 8 motorway, which it passes under at Karlsbad. Passing Stupferich it continues via the Thomashof and Rittnerthof to the hill of Turmberg. From there the destination of Karlsruhe-Durlach is already visible and is reached after a steep descent. The waymarking ends in Durlach at the terminus of the tramway line.

== Literature ==
Martin Kuhnle: Black Forest Mitte/Nord. Bergverlag Rother, Munich, 2013, ISBN 978-3-7633-4420-8, pp. 46–59.
