= Fiducia =

Fiducia may refer to:

- 380 Fiducia, a main-belt asteroid
- Fiducia IT, a defunct German internet service provider
- Fiducia & GAD IT, a German internet service provider

== People with the surname ==
- Donna Fiducia (born 1956), American television and radio personality
