= Eurocity Bank =

Eurocity Bank AG
- Company type: Joint-stock company
- Industry: Bank with full license
- Founded: 1987
- Headquarters: Frankfurt, Germany
- Total assets: €171.5 million (2018)
- Number of employees: 30
- Website: www.eurocitybank.de

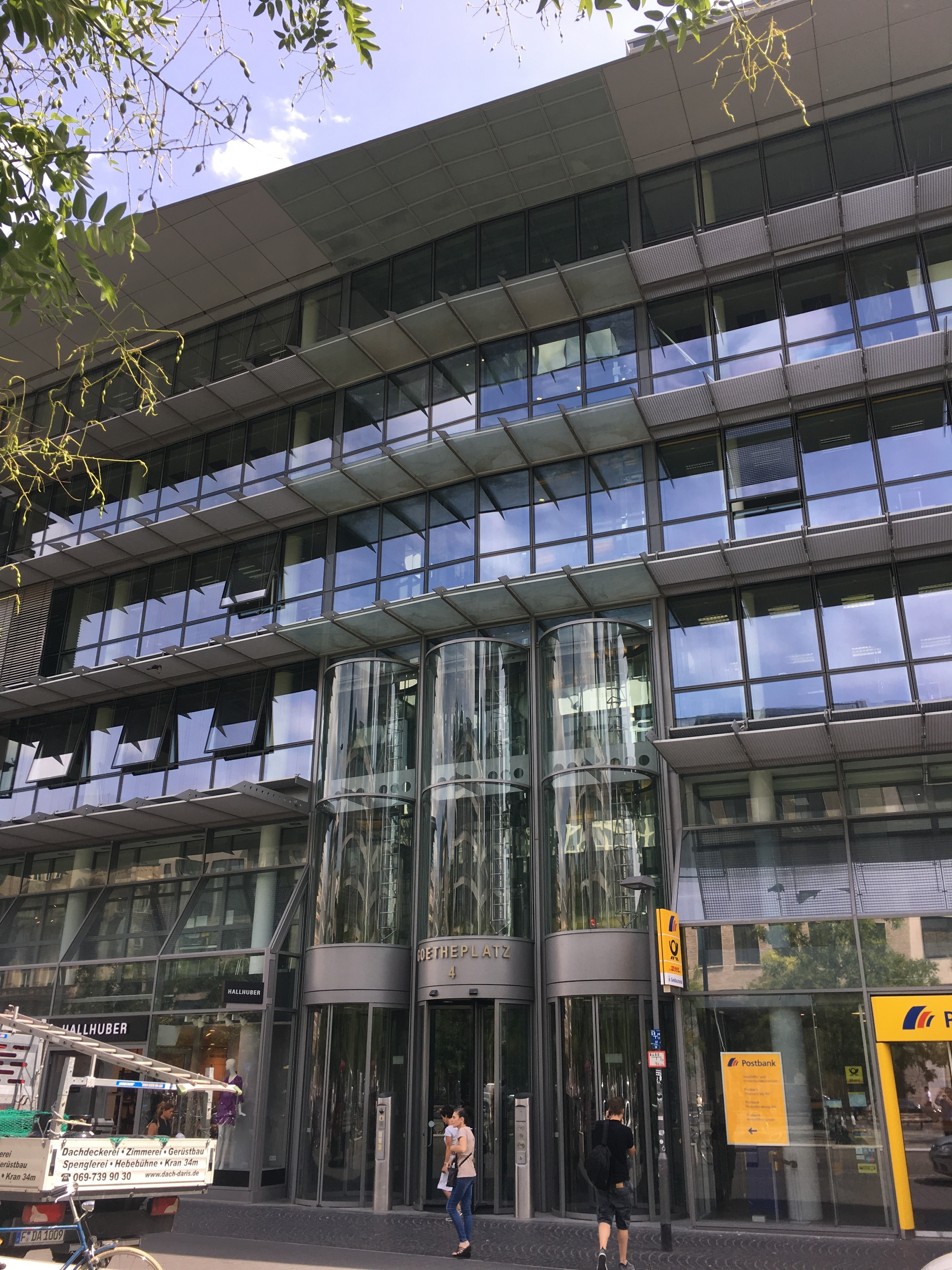
Eurocity Bank in Frankfurt

The Eurocity Bank AG is a fully licensed bank in the legal form of an Aktiengesellschaft. Its headquarters are in Frankfurt am Main, it is owned by Austrian shareholders and Euro Yatırım Holding A.Ş, Istanbul.

== Geschichte ==
Logo until July 2012

Historical Logo

The company was founded in 1987 as Gries & Heissel Bankiers KG by Thomas Gries and Wolfgang Heissel in Berlin in the legal form of a Limited partnership. In 1989, another location was opened in Frankfurt am Main. One year later, the board members and founders received the "Best Entrepreneur of the Year" award. In 1992, the majority of shares were taken over by Berliner Grundkreditbank eG, which in turn became part of Berliner Volksbank eG in 1999.

Since the end of 1999, Gries & Heissel has been a subsidiary of the Wiesbaden-based financial services provider Delta Lloyd Deutschland AG, which is a wholly owned subsidiary of the Delta Lloyd Groep, Amsterdam, and thus part of the internationally operating Aviva - Group.

In 2000, the Frankfurt location was relocated to Wiesbaden, the headquarters of the bank until the middle of 2012. Other former branches in Düsseldorf and Hamburg were closed as part of a restructuring.

In August 2010, Delta Lloyd Deutschland AG announced that it had sold the bank to CR Rashid International F.Z.C., Dubai. In November 2010, however, it was announced that the sale was instead made to private investors.

In 2011, it was announced that, on the basis of a cooperation agreement with the Sydbank, the business with high net worth individuals would not be continued by Gries & Heissel (with effect from 1 January 2012) and customers would be able to continue this with the Sydbank. In April 2012 it was announced that the majority of the bank was acquired by Euro Yatirim Menkul Degerler A.S., Istanbul, and that BaFin had not objected after the conclusion of the proprietor control process.

At the end of July 2012, the company was renamed in Eurocity Bank AG. In mid-August 2012, the company's headquarter was relocated from Wiesbaden to Frankfurt am Main.

In 2016, Euro Yatirim Holding A.S. handed over the capital and voting rights of Eurocity Bank AG to the Austrian shareholders through the sale of voting shares.

== Business areas ==
The former Gries & Heissel Bankiers AG offered private banking services focusing on asset management. As of December 31, 2008, the bank managed assets worth €252 million. As of 1 January 2012, the activities in Private Banking were discontinued or assigned to the cooperation partner Sydbank A/S.

The bank carries out its activities under its full license and specializes in business fields such as syndicated loans, promissory notes and securities lending, apart from the traditional universal banking business.

The bank is a member of the statutory Entschädigungseinrichtung deutscher Banken GmbH. The bank is not a member of the Bundesverband deutscher Banken and its Deposit Guaranty Fund.

The modified available equity as of 31 December 2011 was €3,67 million, since then additional funds have been supplied by the purchaser.

Equity as at 31 December 2016 was €26 million.

== Technology ==
The bank uses the data center of Fiducia IT AG in Karlsruhe as its core banking system.
