= Arthur Nightingale =

British actor (1931–2025)

Arthur Tulloch Nightingale (23 April 1931 – 12 October 2025) was a British actor.

== Life and career ==
Nightingale started his acting career rather late in life. He left school at 14 and worked as a telecommunication technician. It wasn't until the age of 42 that he was able to attend the drama school East 15 and he has worked as an actor ever since. On stage he has performed in plays by Shakespeare and Brecht and has had minor roles in musicals. His first role on TV was in 1978 in the British TV series Pinocchio. Since then he has had supporting or guest roles in various British TV productions among them Great Expectations, Jane, The Professionals, Classic Ghost Stories, London's Burning, Under the Moon, The Bill and Derek. He has also appeared in a few well known British movies including Tinker Tailor Soldier Spy and Quartet.

Late in 2015 Nightingale attracted worldwide attention for his role in the Christmas commercial #heimkommen of the German supermarket chain Edeka, which became a viral video. Edeka published the commercial on 28 November on Facebook and YouTube. On 2 December it had already received 300,000 likes and 500,000 shares on Facebook and over 20 million views on YouTube. As of November 2024, the views on YouTube have increased to over 70 million.

Nightingale died on 12 October 2025, aged 94.

== Filmography ==
- 1978: Pinocchio (TV series)
- 1981: Great Expectations (1981 miniseries)
- 1986: Classic Ghost Stories (TV series)
- 2004: The Calcium Kid
- 2009: Frequently Asked Questions About Time Travel
- 2011: Tinker Tailor Soldier Spy
- 2012: Anna Karenina
- 2012: Quartett
- 2012–2014: Derek (TV series)
- 2015: #heimkommen (commercial)
- 2016: The Crown (TV series)
- 2018–2020: In the Long Run (TV Series)
