= Edekabank =

Coordinates: 53.60295°N 10.02014°E

Edekabank AG
- Industry: Universal bank
- Founded: 9 November 1914
- Headquarters: Hamburg, Germany
- Key people: Armin Schäfer (Chairman) Maik Wandtke (CEO)
- Products: Banking services
- Total assets: 3.712,9 Million € (2020)
- Number of employees: 168 (2020)
- Website: www.edekabank.de

The Edekabank AG is a universal bank and a business of the Edeka Group located at the Edeka House, New-York-Ring 6 in the City Nord in Hamburg. The bank is the central financing institute of Edeka grocery retailers and is active in consumer banking as a direct bank with online and phone consulting.

== Business ==
As of December 31, 2020, with total assets of around 3.7 billion Euro, the Edekabank belongs to the biggest 100 credit institutions in the cooperative banking union.

The Edekabank-Group consists of the parent company Edekabank AG and the subsidiary Edeka Versicherungsdienst Vermittlungs-GmbH. It also included Edeka Leasing GmbH (now LGH Leasinggesellschaft für den Handel mbH) until it was sold to Albis Leasing AG on October 1, 2015.

== Technology ==
The Edekabank AG is affiliated to the cooperative data center of the Atruvia located in Frankfurt and uses the data center’s software agree21 as its core banking system.

== See also ==
- List of banks in Germany
