= Durlach =

District of Karlsruhe

- Borough of Karlsruhe
- Coat of arms

- Location of Durlach within Karlsruhe
- Interactive map of Durlach
- Location within Germany Location within Baden-Württemberg
- Coordinates: 48°59′57″N 8°28′12″E
- Country: Germany
- State: Baden-Württemberg
- District: Urban district
- City: Karlsruhe

Area
  - Total: 22.9413 km^{2} (8.8577 sq mi)

Population (2020-12-31)
  - Total: 43,600
  - Density: 1,900/km^{2} (4,920/sq mi)
- Time zone: UTC+01:00 (CET)
  - Summer (DST): UTC+02:00 (CEST)
- Postal codes: 76227
- Dialling codes: 0721

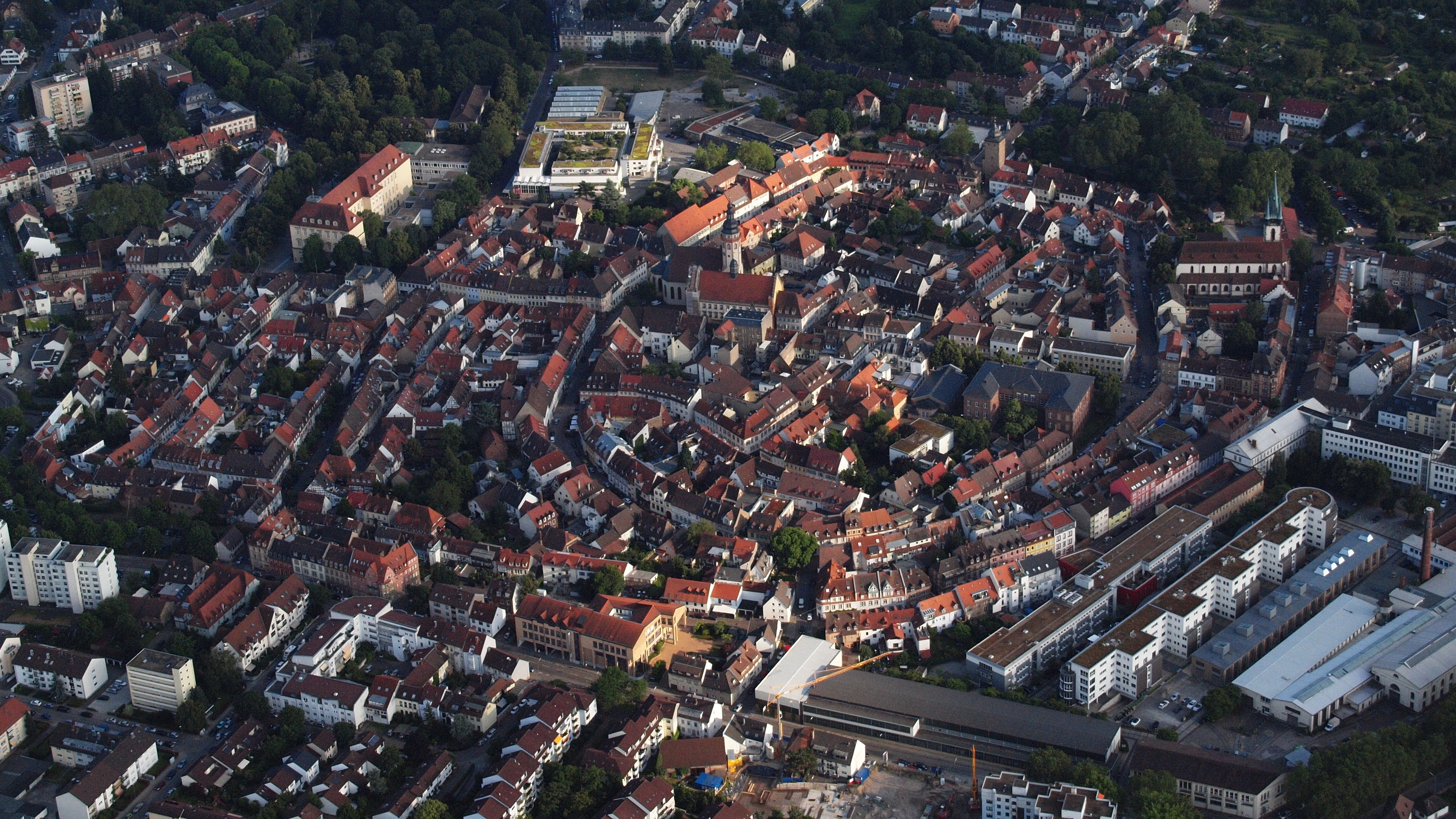
Aerial view of Durlach

Durlach is a district in Karlsruhe, Germany, with a population of roughly 30,000.

The district is further divided into Alt-Durlach, Dornwald-Untermühl, Hanggebiet, Bergwald, Aue, Lohn-Lissen and Killisfeld.

== History ==
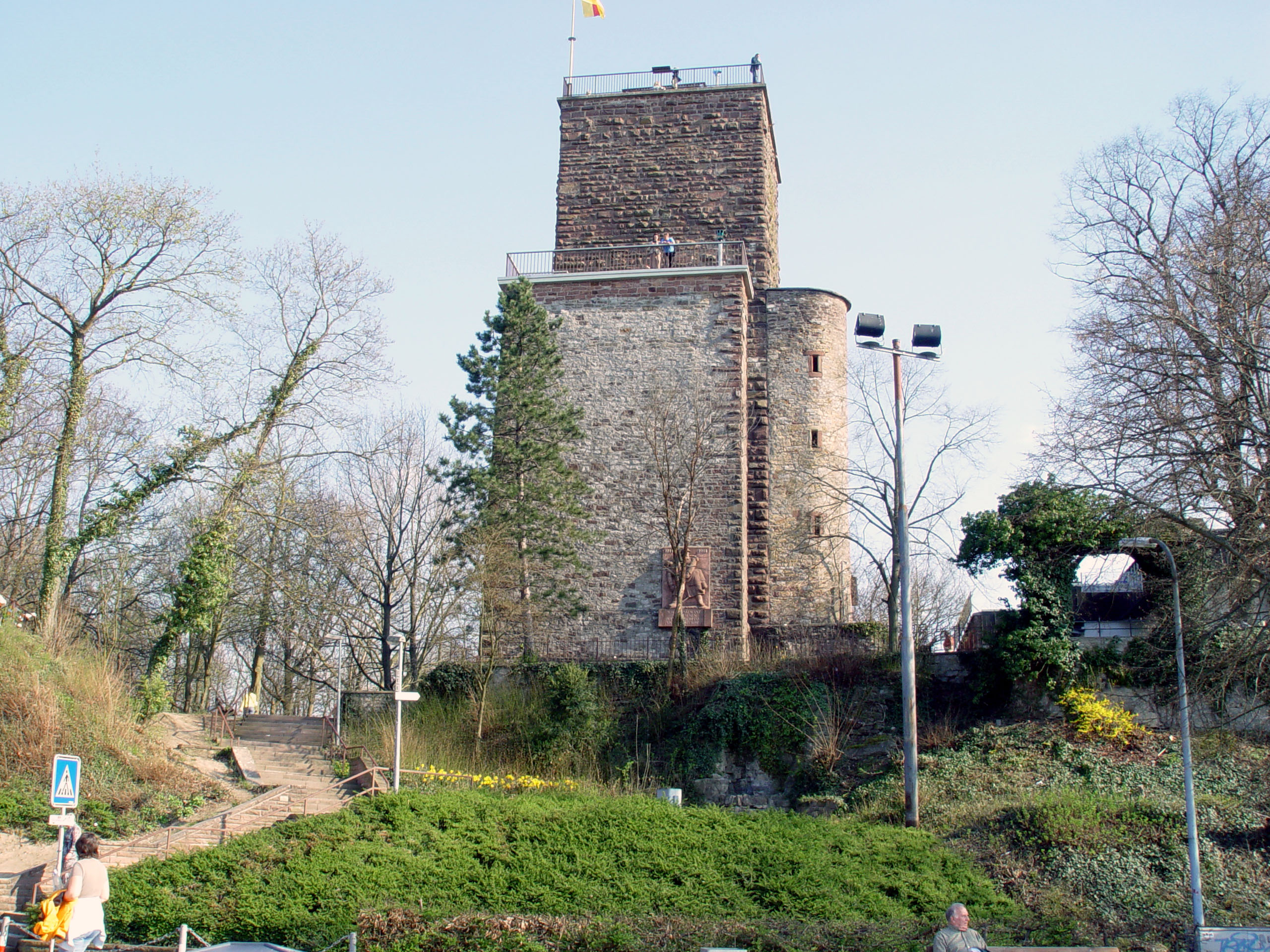
The tower on the hill Turmberg

Durlach was bestowed by emperor Frederick II on the margrave Hermann V of Zähringen as an allodial possession.

It was chosen by the margrave Charles II in 1565 as residence of the rulers of Baden-Durlach, and retained this distinction though it was almost totally destroyed by the French in 1689.

Margrave Charles III William decided that he needed more space which led to the foundation of Karlsruhe in 1715, which three years later became the new capital until the state was merged into the grand-duchy of Baden.

In 1846, it was the seat of a congress of the Liberal Party of the Baden Parliament. In 1849 during the Baden Revolution, it was the scene of an encounter between the Prussians and the insurgents.

In 1938, Durlach was incorporated into Karlsruhe, which had was now bigger and connected by a canal and an avenue of poplars with it, on the left bank of the Pfinz, at the foot of the Turmberg.

During the Second World War, 329 people were killed in Durlach.

Georg Friedrich von Reichenbach and Ernst Ludwig Posselt (1763–1804, historian) were natives of the town.

== Life and heritage ==
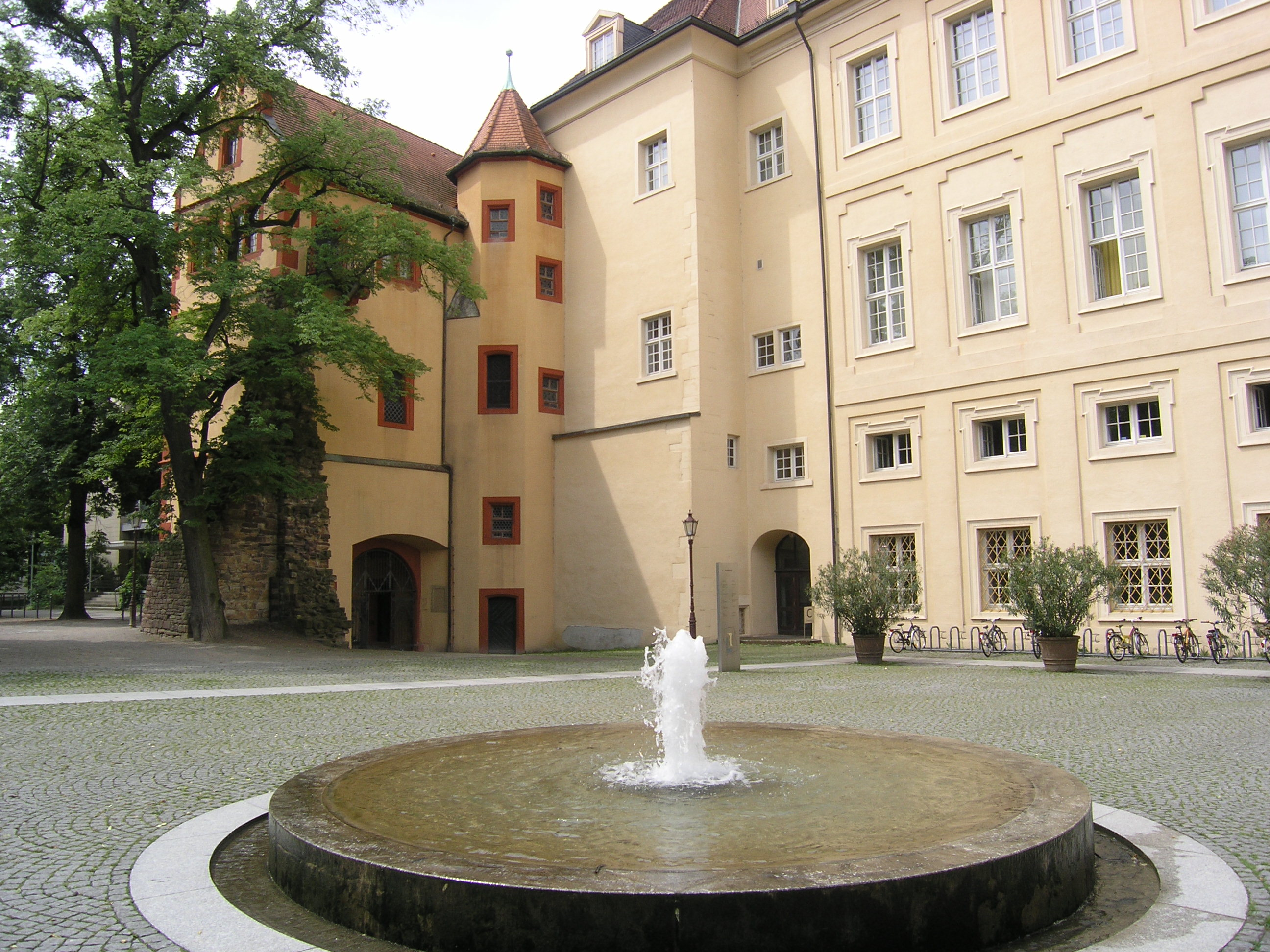
Karlsburg Castle

Important attractions are the Karlsburg Castle in the center, erected in 1565 and later used as barracks, now with some museums an ancient town hall, a church with an excellent organ, and in the market-place a statue of the margrave Charles II.

The Turmberg ('tower hill') is a vineyard-covered hill of the northernmost part of the Black Forest. A castle ruin with watch-tower are located on top of the Turmberg. The watch-tower in particular offers fine views of Karlsruhe towards the west and the Rhine River valley. On very clear days even farther west the Vosges in France can be seen. The Rhine River is the border between Germany and Alsace area of France. The South and East offer nice views of the Black Forest, and since the Turmberg is the northernmost tip of the Black Forest you have hills more than actual mountains. A staircase leads all the way up from the bottom of the hill to the top, however you can also ride up using the Turmbergbahn, a historic funicular railway. In recent years the railway was changed from water gravity to electric.

== Economy ==
Durlach hosted several factories, producing sewing-machines (Pfaff), brushes, chemicals, tobacco, beer, vinegar, chicory and pipe organs. Now most manufacture has disappeared, except for a producer of homeopathy and dietary supplements. IT companies have taken their place, the biggest Fiducia IT AG, which provides banking services for most German credit unions.

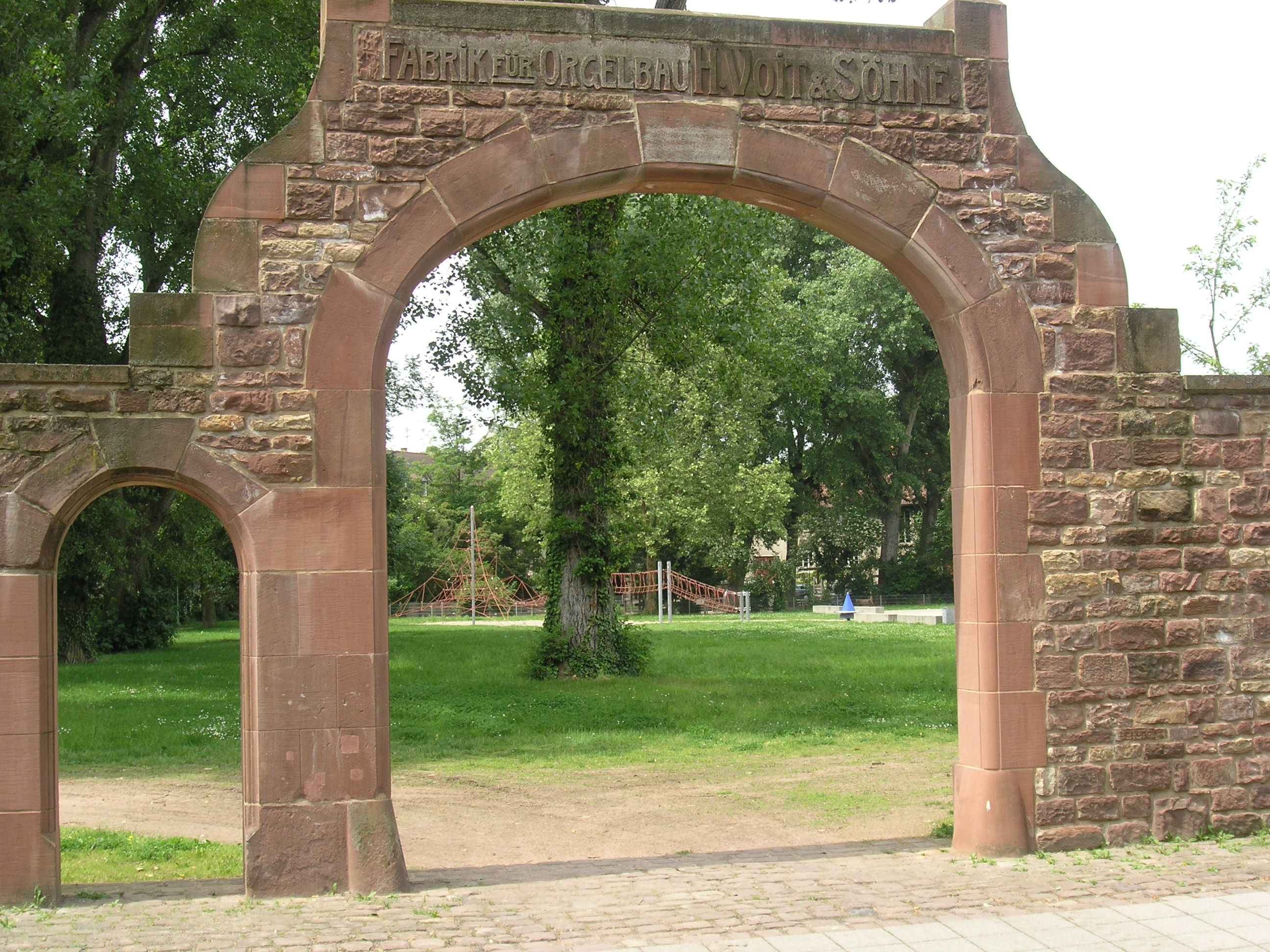
H. Veit & Sons organ factory

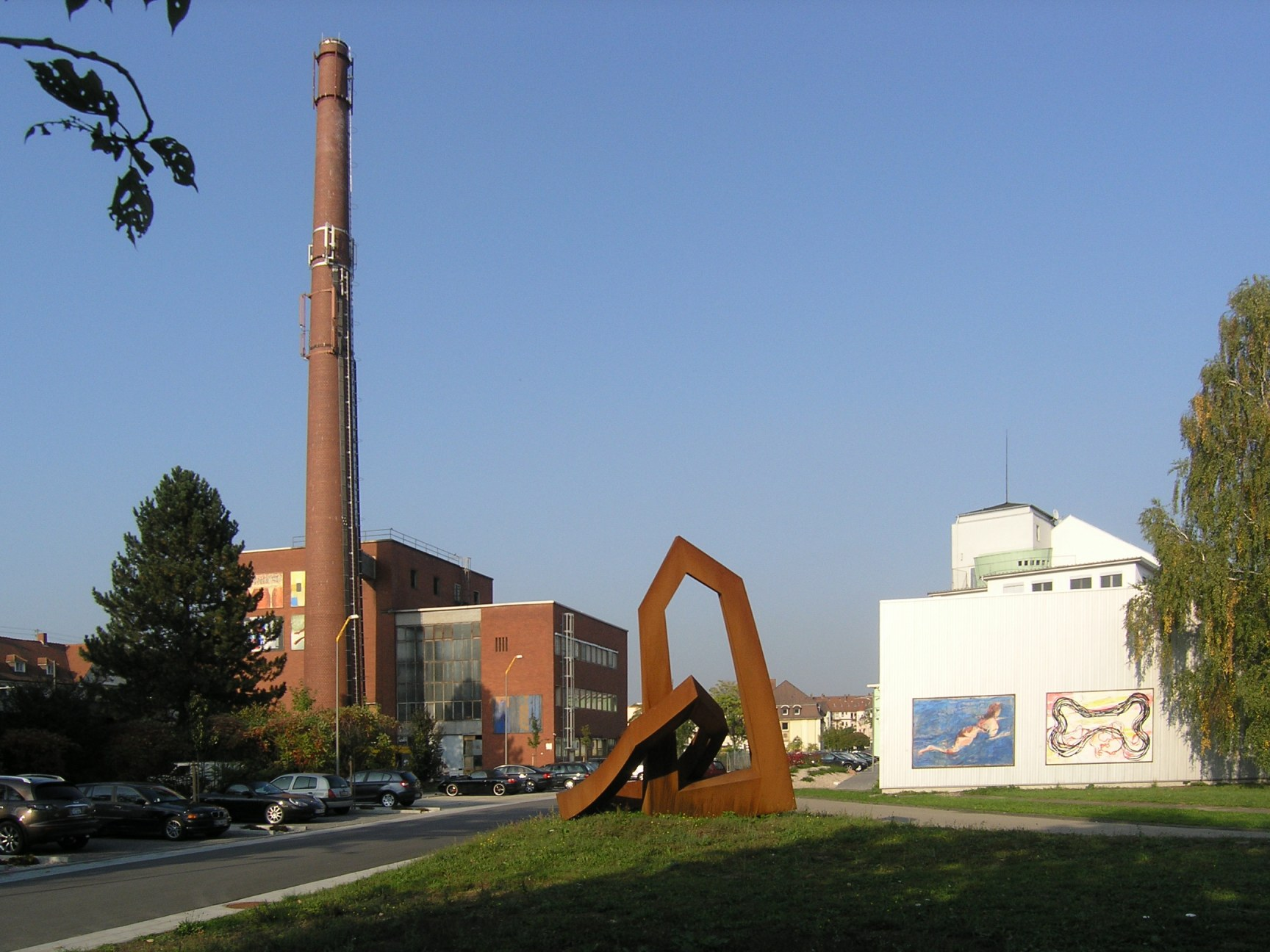
Former Pfaff factory, now RaumFabrik

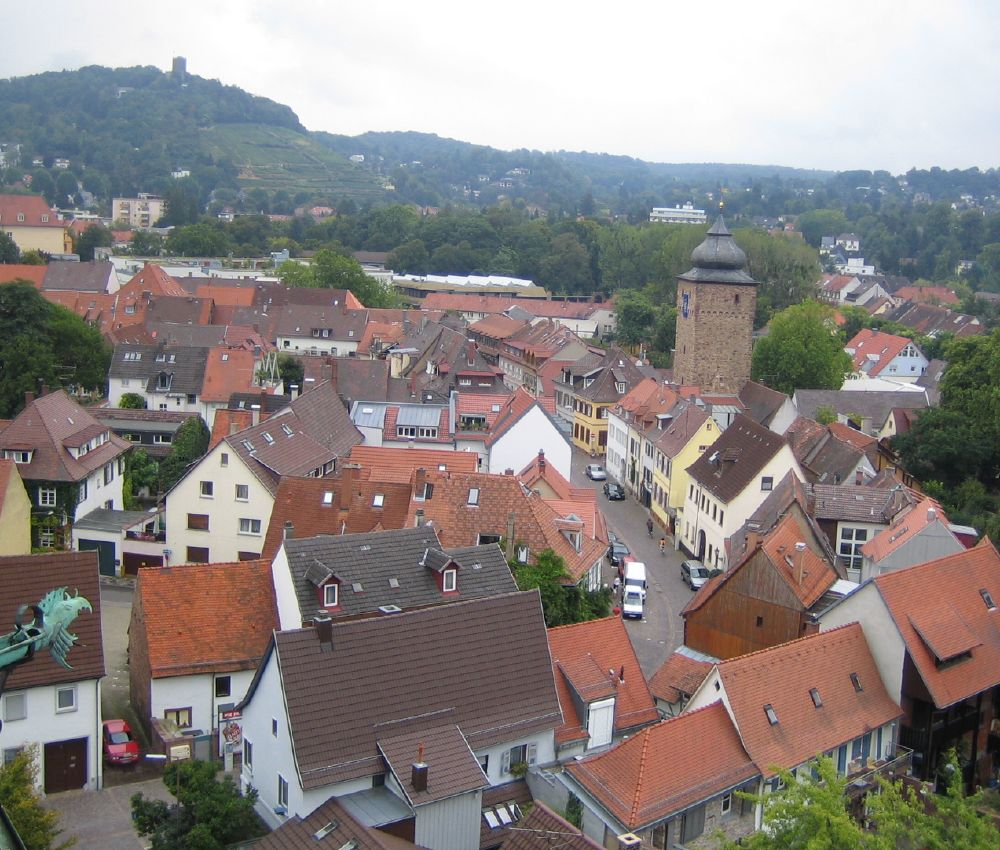
Historical city center

== Books ==
- Chisholm, Hugh, ed. (1911). "Durlach" . Encyclopædia Britannica. Vol. 8 (11th ed.). Cambridge University Press. p. 711. This work in turn cites:
  - Fecht, Geschichte der Stadt Durlach (Heidelberg, 1869).
