= Derek (TV series) =

British television comedy drama created by Ricky Gervais

- Genre: Mockumentary; Comedy drama
- Created by: Ricky Gervais
- Written by: Ricky Gervais
- Directed by: Ricky Gervais
- Starring: Ricky Gervais; Kerry Godliman; David Earl; Karl Pilkington; Holli Dempsey; Brett Goldstein; Colin Hoult
- Country of origin: United Kingdom
- Original language: English
- No. of series: 2
- No. of episodes: 14

Production
- Executive producer: Ricky Gervais
- Producer: Charlie Hanson
- Cinematography: Martin Hawkins
- Editor: Valerio Bonelli
- Running time: 24 mins
- Production company: Derek Productions Ltd.

Original release
- Network: Channel 4
- Release: 12 April 2012 – 22 December 2014

Derek is a British comedy-drama television series starring, written and directed by Ricky Gervais. The pilot was produced by Derek Productions Ltd. for Channel 4 and aired on 12 April 2012. Channel 4 describes the show as "A bittersweet comedy drama about a group of outsiders living on society's margins".

On 9 May 2012, Channel 4 announced it had commissioned a full series, which aired from 30 January 2013. On 4 March 2013 (two days before the final episode of the first series was aired), they announced Derek had been recommissioned for a second series, to be shown again on Channel 4 and later on Netflix.

The first series became available for streaming on Netflix on 12 September 2013. The second series, consisting of six episodes, started airing on 23 April 2014 on Channel 4 and concluded on 28 May 2014. In November 2014, Channel 4 announced that a 60-minute "final" special episode of Derek would air in the United Kingdom on 22 December 2014.

== Genesis and pilot ==
The pilot episode aired on 12 April 2012 on Channel 4. Filmed in a mockumentary style, the programming is set mostly in a nursing home, and centres on Derek, a helper at the home. The title character made his first appearance in the 2001 Edinburgh Fringe show Rubbernecker.

Gervais says the programming was inspired by his relatives who work in care homes: "Half my family are care workers. My sister works with kids with learning difficulties. My sister-in-law works in a care home for people with Alzheimer's. And four or five of my nieces work in old people's homes. I always write about what I know."

== Plot ==
Gervais plays 50-year-old Derek Noakes, a care worker at Broad Hill, a home for the elderly; he has worked there for three years. He likes watching reality television shows and game shows, and is interested in celebrities, YouTube and, above all, talking about animals. The viewer is told he is kind, helpful and selfless, with good intentions. He is vulnerable because of his childlike naivety and distractions from society. He is ridiculed and ostracised, as well as marginalised by mainstream society because of his social awkwardness and lack of inhibition. Derek says it is more important to be kind than to be clever or good-looking. Some commentators have described him as disabled or autistic, although Gervais denies this.

== Cast ==
=== Main characters ===
- Ricky Gervais as Derek Noakes, an employee of the care home
- Kerry Godliman as Hannah, the care home's manager
- David Earl as Kevin "Kev" Twine, a homeless, unemployed alcoholic who hangs around the care home
- Karl Pilkington as Dougie, the home's caretaker (Main Series 1, guest Series 2)
- Colin Hoult as Geoff, the home's caretaker replacing Dougie after he leaves (Series 2 and Special)
- Holli Dempsey as Vicky, initially working in the care home on community service, she goes on to become a volunteer, an employee and eventually cover Hannah's maternity leave as acting manager
- Brett Goldstein as Tom, Hannah's love interest and grandson of Annie, a resident of the carehome

=== Regular characters ===
- Ninette Finch as Annie, Tom's grandmother
- Ruth Bratt as Mary
- Margaret Towner as Edna
- Joan Linder as Joan
- Kay Noone as Lizzie
- Vilma Hollingbery as Elsie
- Tim Barlow as Jack
- Arthur Nightingale as Arthur
- Tony Rohr as Anthony, Derek's father
- Sheila Collings as Sheila
- Barry Martin as Joe
- Prem Modgil as Prem
- Blanche Williams as Precious
- Laura Jane Hudson as Jill
- Pamela Lyne as Marge

=== Guest characters ===
- Doc Brown as Deon, works at the care home on community service – 1 episode
- Joe Wilkinson as Cliff Twine, Kev's brother – 2 episodes
- Vicky Hall as Tracy, Derek's girlfriend – 2 episodes
- Toby Foster as Les, Tom's work friend and best man at his wedding – 1 episode
- Tony Way as Pete, Jack's grandson – 1 episode
- Robert Vahey as Gerald, Lizzie's husband – 1 episode
- Susannah Wise as Rebecca, Hannah's former classmate and Jill's daughter – 1 episode
- Ashley McGuire as Shelley, Marge's daughter – 1 episode
- Tom Basden as autograph expert – 1 episode
- Tom Hughes as Andy, a love interest for Vicky – 1 episode

== Episodes ==
Series	Episodes	Originally aired	
Series	Episodes	First aired	Last aired
Pilot	1	12 April 2012	
1	6	30 January 2013	6 March 2013
2	6	23 April 2014	28 May 2014
Special	1	22 December 2014	

=== Pilot (2012) ===
No. overall	No. in series	Title	Directed by	Written by	Original release date	UK viewers (millions)
1	1	"Pilot"	Ricky Gervais	Ricky Gervais	12 April 2012	2.59
Ricky Gervais is Derek Noakes, a middle-aged man who is a care assistant in a retirement home. His friends, caretaker Dougie (Karl Pilkington) and manager Hannah (Kerry Godliman), also work there. Hannah has been there for 15 years. Unemployed Kev spends a lot of time in the home. Derek moved in with Dougie when Derek's mother died. A handsome young man, Tom, visits his grandmother Annie in the home frequently. A film crew arrives, which Derek suspects is from Secret Millionaire. He shows his favorite YouTube video, Hamster on a Piano. Hannah is attracted to Tom. She assumes all good men are married or homosexual. She wants to find out his sexual orientation without him knowing she wants to know. She reasons she can work out his orientation if she knows his favourite films and television shows. Derek asks Tom on her behalf, but he gives away the reason he is asking. Tom pretends he is homosexual by saying he is a fan of Glee, The Wizard of Oz, Judy Garland, Liza Minnelli and Audrey Hepburn. Tom says to Hannah he was joking, and he is single and heterosexual. An awkward conversation ensues between Hannah and Tom, in which she pretends it was Derek who wanted to know his orientation. Hannah and Derek go to a pub, where three female chavs insult Derek. Hannah headbutts one of them, before she and Derek leave. Joan, Derek's favorite resident at the home, dies. Tom takes Hannah to the pub; Derek tags along without invitation.

=== Series 1 (2013) ===
No. overall	No. in series	Title	Directed by	Written by	Original release date	UK viewers (millions)
2	1	"Episode 1"	Ricky Gervais	Ricky Gervais	30 January 2013	2.32
A visit from a council official, Roger, sees Broad Hill retirement home facing the choice of a major cut in funding or closure. Hannah, the home's manager, is determined to keep it open. He says the home is spending too much on staff, then tries to justify making some staff redundant. The staff tell Kev to leave because his presence is a liability with Roger there. He is not satisfied with Jack of all trades Dougie employed there because he does not do enough work to justify full-time employment, and is not qualified. She rallies best mates Derek, Dougie and Kev. They start a petition to keep the home open, and go to Hampstead High Street to gain signatures. Staff from the local animal shelter bring in several animals for a few hours as pet therapy for the residents. Roger asks Hannah if Derek is autistic. She avoids answering, and Derek says he does not know and it does not matter. Dougie tells Roger to leave, which he does. The staff and residents are very pleased with Dougie.
3	2	"Episode 2"	Ricky Gervais	Ricky Gervais	6 February 2013	1.98
It is Derek's 50th birthday. Dougie says he is a decade younger than Derek and is jealous that Derek still has a full head of hair. Derek celebrates with a party at Broad Hill, specifying the music and food he wants. Dougie takes Kev and some of the residents in a minibus to the local library. The party takes place that night, during which Hannah brings Derek a birthday cake with 50 candles on it. Derek feels nauseated after drinking Special Brew given to him by Kev. Derek and Hannah show Vicky around, a girl doing community service after her conviction for stealing shoes from the shop she worked in. Vicky initially dislikes the home, but with Hannah's encouragement, begins to like it. Vicky decides to come back next week as a volunteer.
4	3	"Episode 3"	Ricky Gervais	Ricky Gervais	13 February 2013	1.79
Kev brings a morbidly obese, ugly, middle-aged woman into the home. He boasts about how much sex they have. In the home's garden, Derek licks a toad after Kev suggests it. Derek wants to save the life of a baby bird fallen from a tree. He phones 999 for an ambulance. One of the paramedics tells him it is dead. Some of the residents attend a jumble sale. Dougie is annoyed with Derek for buying an ugly ornament which they took to the jumble sale to get rid of. It is date night for Tom and Hannah. Marge, a dying resident, suggests to Tom he marry Hannah. She gives her engagement ring to him to give to Hannah. After Marge's death, her obnoxious daughter Shelley (who was to inherit the ring) arrives, and takes the ring from Tom. Dougie angrily ejects her.
5	4	"Episode 4"	Ricky Gervais	Ricky Gervais	20 February 2013	1.43
Derek and Kev try to sell some of their autographs to raise money for the home. They are unable to, because Derek cannot remember who the autographs were signed by, and Kev's are all on pictures which prominently include him. Hannah's rich, narcissistic, friendless former classmate Rebecca brings her mother Jill into the home to become a new resident. Rebecca boasts about her success before leaving. Dougie drives Derek, Kev, and several of the residents to Broadstairs for a day trip. During the journey, Derek asks Dougie several stupid questions.
6	5	"Episode 5"	Ricky Gervais	Ricky Gervais	27 February 2013	1.66
Derek forms an entertainment committee to plan a cabaret show at Broad Hill. Kev tries to produce Boys on Film, a play of his Duran Duran film script - casting himself, staff, and residents as the band. Kev and Derek tell jokes. Deon, on a community service after his conviction for stealing shoes from a shop, performs 'rap music' about working at the home.
7	6	"Episode 6"	Ricky Gervais	Ricky Gervais	6 March 2013	1.52
Derek watches a video of a baby monkey riding on a pig. Hannah tells Derek his father, Anthony, phoned the home and wants to see him. Derek has not seen him since he walked out when he was a child, and he refuses to see Anthony. Much-loved resident Lizzie dies, and her funeral is attended by many of the residents and staff. Anthony turns up, and approaches Derek. Derek initially rejects Anthony, but, minutes later, changes his mind, and they go to the home together, where he introduces Anthony to the residents and staff.

=== Series 2 (2014) ===
No. overall	No. in series	Title	Directed by	Written by	Original release date	UK viewers (millions)
8	1	"Episode 1"	Ricky Gervais	Ricky Gervais	23 April 2014	2.29
Most of the old Broad Hill faces are back, alongside a few new one players. Vicky is a permanent member of staff as the home's unofficial beautician. New member of staff Geoff claims there are camps in which humanzees are kept. Derek is happy Antony is moving in. He tells Derek about his travels to many countries. Tom and Hannah are trying to conceive, which Derek tells the other staff and residents about. After called to remove a large spider from the toilet, annoyed by Geoff, and electrocuted by an electric heater he wired incorrectly, Dougie quits. Last appearance of Dougie
9	2	"Episode 2"	Ricky Gervais	Ricky Gervais	30 April 2014	1.81
Derek talks about Hannah and Tom's sex life in front of everyone at the home while keeping a written record of it. Kev asks Hannah if she will have casual sex with him. Interviews are conducted at Broad Hill by Hannah and a colleague for the caretaker position vacated by Dougie, who is moving to Manchester. Kev decides to clean-up his act, and goes to an Alcoholics Anonymous meeting. He is one of the interviewees, but is not selected because he is unappealing and dysfunctional. He resumes drinking alcohol, days after he stopped. Pete, a successful financier who is the grandson of resident Jack, brings his caravan to Broad Hill's car park, and donates it to Derek and Kev to live in.
10	3	"Episode 3"	Ricky Gervais	Ricky Gervais	7 May 2014	1.69
Hannah and Tom have happy news. Derek's dad, Anthony, goes on a date with Tom's nan. Matters of the heart are taking a downward turn for Kev, who calls on his brother, Cliff, for help.
11	4	"Episode 4"	Ricky Gervais	Ricky Gervais	14 May 2014	1.24
Derek and the Broad Hill gang go on a trip to London Zoo. Hannah suffers a painful loss.
12	5	"Episode 5"	Ricky Gervais	Ricky Gervais	21 May 2014	1.48
The staff from Medway Animal Rescue Centre comes to visit, and, for Derek, this means playing with Ivor. Tom is torn between his love of the Merchant Navy and his commitment to Hannah, Derek, Kev, and the elderly.
13	6	"Episode 6"	Ricky Gervais	Ricky Gervais	28 May 2014	1.19
Derek goes on a date with a girl from a dating website. They bond over their mutual love of burping. He's excited but worried about his dad's health. Kev teaches Derek to ride a bike, and Geoff goes too far.

=== Special (2014) ===
No. overall	No. in series	Title	Directed by	Written by	Original release date	UK viewers (millions)
14	1	"Derek: The Special"	Ricky Gervais	Ricky Gervais	22 December 2014	0.85
In a 60-minute series finale, filmed at West London Film Studios, Broad Hill prepares for Hannah and Tom's wedding. A vicar visits the home, but his close-mindedness proves no match for the simple wisdom of Derek. Kev's behaviour proves too much for Hannah. The residents of Broad Hill finally come together in celebration of Hannah and Tom's union as Derek sings an inane song about pudding.

== Reception ==
On Rotten Tomatoes the first series holds a rating of 53% based on 32 critics, with the consensus reading: "Derek is as irreverent as might be expected from a show starring Ricky Gervais, but this time he brings a surprising amount of depth and empathy to the title character." On Metacritic, the first series of the show earned a rating of 64 out of 100, indicating "generally favorable reviews".

The show generated occasional controversy due to a perception by some viewers it mocks intellectual disability. Tanya Gold, writing for The Guardian, dismissed Gervais's claims in Derek, he was satirising prejudice against disabled people, instead saying it "feels more like lazy cruelty than satire". Jack Seale criticised the show for relying on elements and characterisations from other programming by Gervais. The Guardian's Sam Wollaston found it to be "not very good", and says "the whole mockumentary thing feels tired now".

Tom Sutcliffe of The Independent questioned the wisdom of commissioning the programming: "To my mind, the pilot of Ricky Gervais's comedy about an assistant in a retirement home already fully explored its awkward – and testing – balance of comedy and emotion." Discussing the show's compassionate moments, he wrote "Derek's redeeming qualities are the hardest to take – a sense of self-congratulation at the refinement of its sentiments that has a little bit of the bully in it, too."

Gervais' performance as Derek received mixed reviews. Diane Werts of Newsday reacted positively, saying "Gervais nailed it". Curt Wagner of Red Eye says Gervais "surprises with some tender, quiet acting, and obvious love of the character. Rob Owen of Pittsburgh Post-Gazette says "although there could be an ick factor to Mr. Gervais playing a character with developmental issues, that turns out not to be the case. Mr. Gervais creates a character, not a caricature." On the other hand, The Guardian's Sam Wollaston says "Ricky Gervais is out of his depth playing a character that isn't based on his worst foibles." Terry Ramsey of The Telegraph says "There is Gervais's cringe-making performance in the title role. I'm sorry, but Derek is simply Ricky Gervais in a patterned jumper with a cricked neck. Gervais is not a character actor, and what Derek needs to bring him alive is to be more believable. What he really needs is someone else playing him."

The second series of Derek generated some positive reviews. The second series currently holds a 67% based on 9 critics on Rotten Tomatoes. Hank Stuever of The Washington Post reacted positively, saying "Derek is an honest and often charming endeavor." Kyle Anderson of Entertainment Weekly also praised the show, but says the absence of Karl Pilkington hurt the series, saying: "The second series mostly upholds the first's tricky precedent, but the absence of regular Gervais associate Karl Pilkington means the yuks are a bit less hearty." Terry Ramsey of The Telegraph wrote, "We didn't need a second series of Ricky Gervais's comedy drama Derek." In a review in The Guardian, Sam Wollaston says "That's the other big problem with Derek...it's not very smart. Or very funny. Or very good." Msn.com says "Ricky Gervais' Derek remains a mawkish mess. Where to begin? The mockumentary format is moribund. The ethics are muddy. The tone is all over the place in everything but its consistent condescension." Matt D of Unrealitytv.co.uk agrees, saying "The primary reasons for this are the imbalance in tone and Gervais' central performance, both of which stop Derek from being a truly enjoyable programme." AV Club says "Derek has all the creative ambition of [an online video of little piggies and bunnies doing cute things]." Indie Wire says "Series two is all over the map." Michael Hogan of The Telegraph says Derek is a "saccharine series" and "dreadful". Serena Davies, from the same publication, says "the show seems to have been devised by someone of Derek's limited intelligence... [I will not be] wasting any more of my time watching this rather flimsy, curiously pointless programme."

The special was given two stars out of five by The Telegraph. The reviewer, Ed Power, criticised the episode for the "weak performance" from Gervais and the "sub-Forrest Gump sympathy milking". He described it as "glib" and "manipulative". The Guardian reviewer Julia Raeside concurred, adding "I can find no comedy in it, and it lacks the emotional truth required for a drama."

=== Awards and nominations ===
Year	Association	Category	Nominee(s)	Result
2014	Primetime Emmy Awards	Primetime Emmy Award for Outstanding Lead Actor in a Comedy Series	Ricky Gervais	Nominated
2014	Golden Globe Awards	Best Actor – Television Series Musical or Comedy	Ricky Gervais	Nominated
2015	Primetime Emmy Awards	Primetime Emmy Award for Outstanding Lead Actor in a Miniseries or a Movie	Ricky Gervais	Nominated

== DVD releases ==
The complete first series of Derek was released on DVD and Blu-ray on 11 November 2013. The complete second series of Derek was released on DVD on 17 November 2014. A two-disc set containing the first and second series on DVD was also released on 17 November 2014. Derek: The Special was released on DVD on 26 October 2015. A complete collection set was released featuring series and the special.
