= Heimkommen =

2015 advertisement directed by Alex Feil

Heimkommen (German: [ˈhaɪmˌkɔmən]; "Homecoming") and the related hashtag #heimkommen is a German commercial video for the supermarket corporation Edeka that went viral in November and December 2015.

In the commercial, Arthur Nightingale plays a German grandfather faking his own death to reunite his family on Christmas.

== Video ==
The 1:46-minute commercial shows a well-to-do grandfather receiving messages over the years from his successful children around the world, who call off family get-togethers at Christmas time. Each year he eats his Christmas dinner by himself. Eventually he fakes his own death, and his grieving children and grandchildren travel to his home, only to find him still alive. He tells them, "I had no other way to bring you together". After the family unites in a joyful Christmas dinner, the final shot shows the Edeka logo.

Arthur Tulloch Nightingale plays the role of the grandfather The advertising agency is Jung von Matt. Alex Feil directed the clip, which was shot in Prague and Bangkok. Florian Lakenmacher of Supreme Music wrote the song "Dad" for it, which is sung by Neele Ternes. The song reached number 43 on the German charts.

== Viral phenomenon ==
Edeka published the commercial on Facebook and YouTube on November 28, 2015. By December 2 it had received 300,000 likes and 500,000 shares on Facebook and over 20 million views on YouTube. As of 18 December 2015, views on YouTube had passed 43 million.

== Reviews and reactions ==
British retail chains (compare John Lewis Christmas advert) often use emotional commercials for Christmas, but this had not been the custom in Germany. #heimkommen led on a current chart of such ads with more than 33 million clicks after a week. The video is a showcase for Integrated marketing communications on different channels.

Parodies have appeared including: a family angry about the deception killing their grandfather and a Deutsche Bahn image showing Arthur Nightingdale in a train dining car and the caption: Lieber Opa, warte nicht bis sie zu Dir kommen (Dear Grandpa, don't wait till they come to you). An Italian PR agency reworked the spot shortly after its release with an Italian background; in their version, the nonno expresses fears about his stock of Parmesan cheese deteriorating.
