= Turmbergbahn =

Closed funicular railway in Karlsruhe, Germany

Coordinates: 48°59′52.34″N 8°28′59.92″E

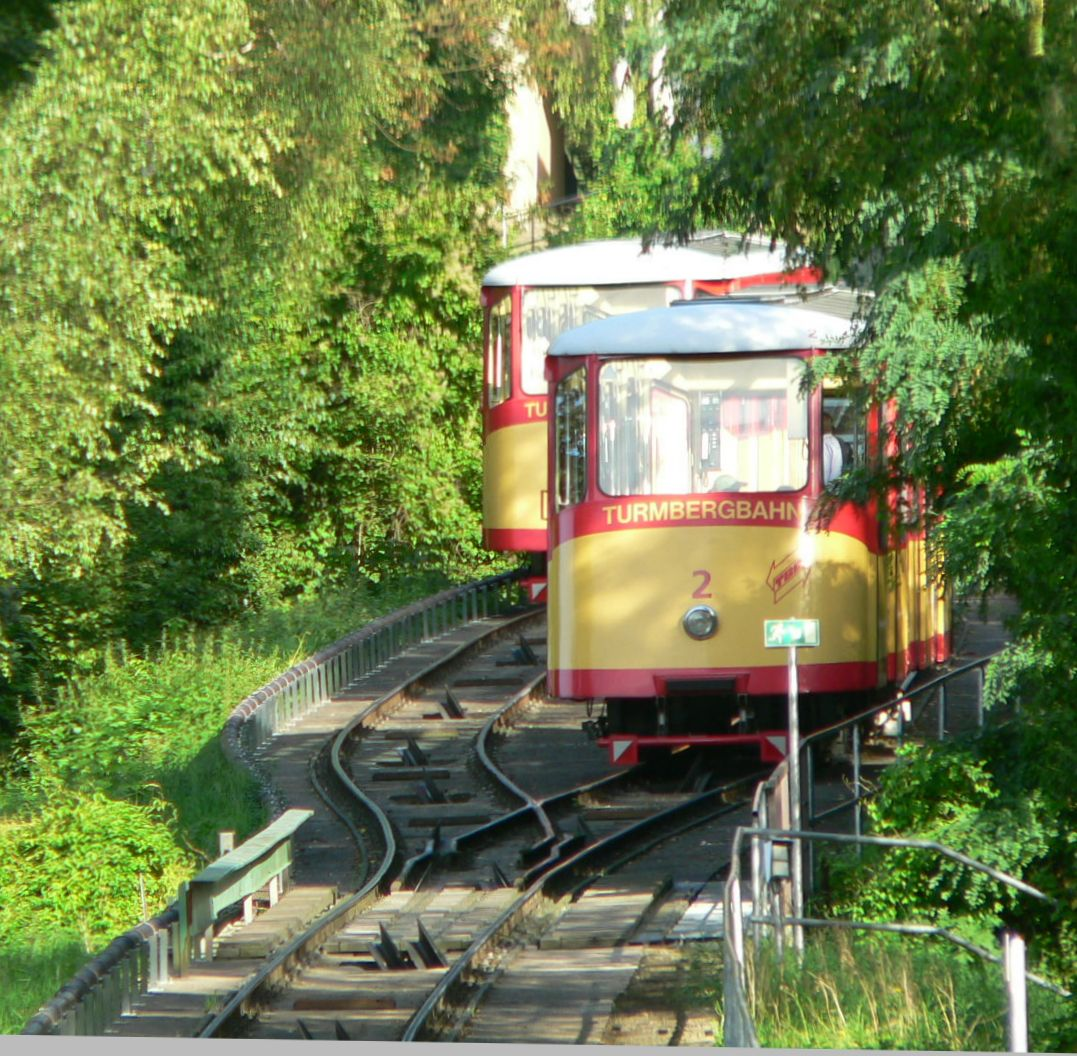
Turmbergbahn cars at passing loop

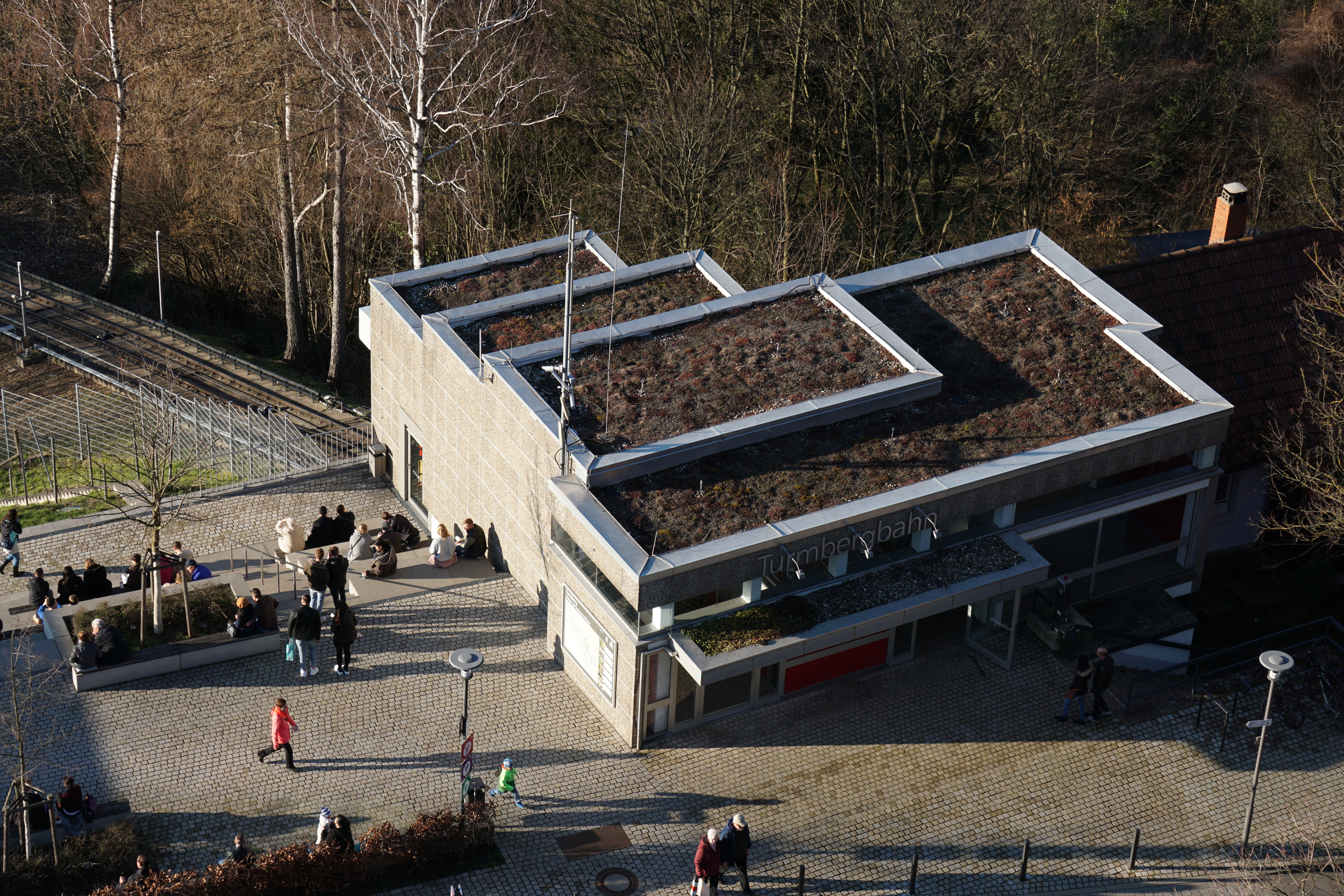
Upper station from above

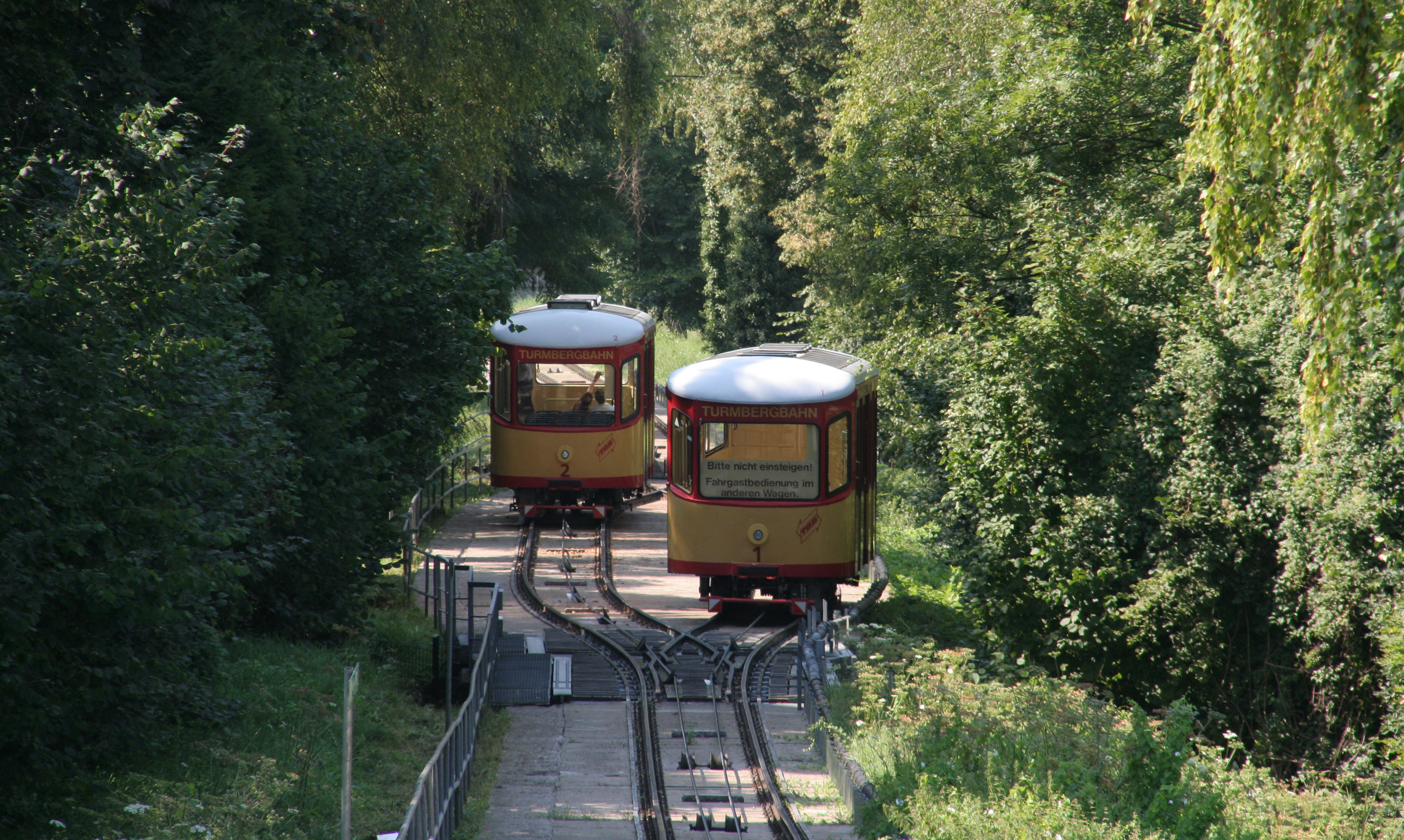
Looking down the line

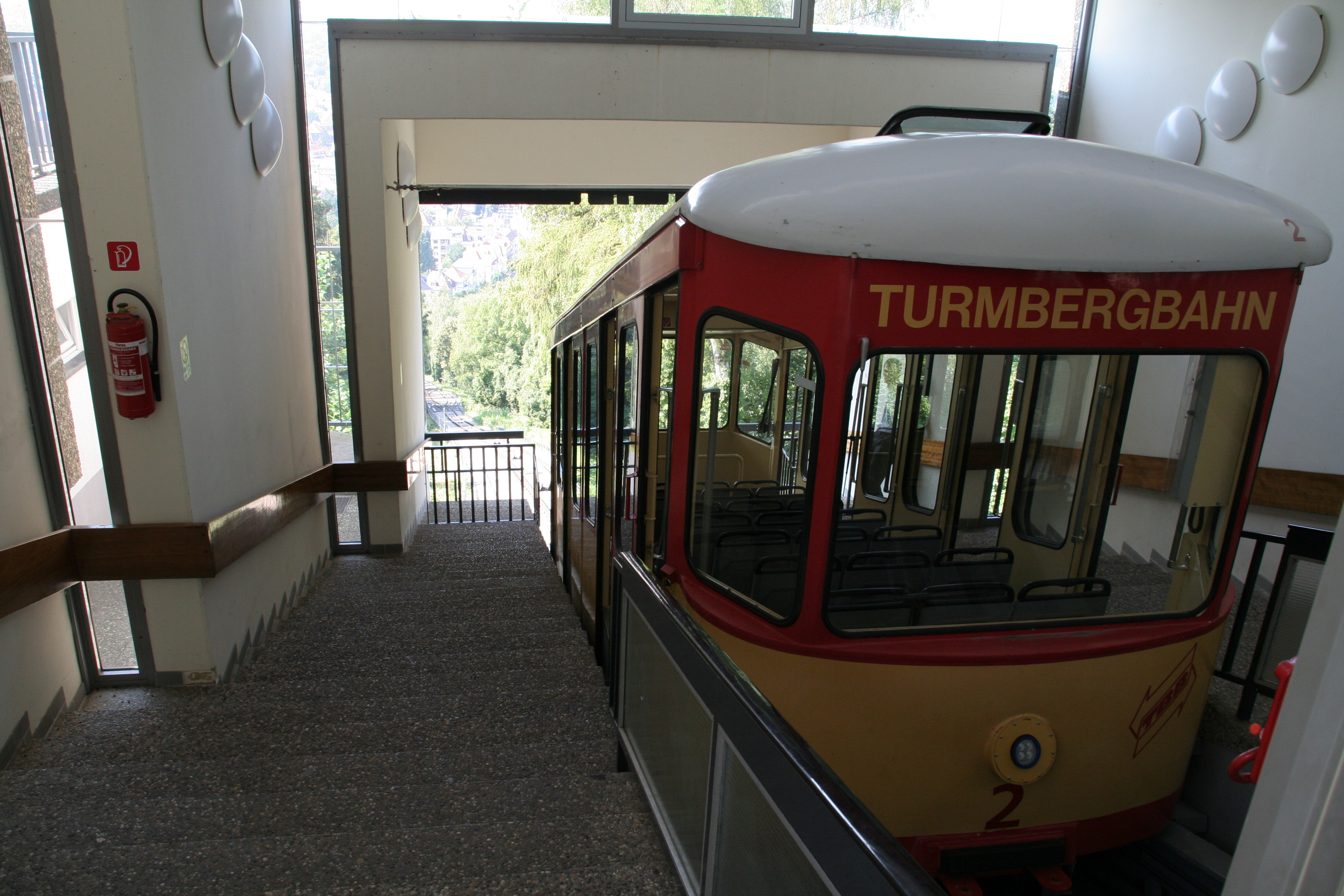
Interior of upper station

The Turmbergbahn is a defunct funicular railway in Karlsruhe in Germany. It was the oldest operating funicular in Germany from its opening in 1888 until its closure in 2024. From Durlach, the line climbed the Turmberg, which on a clear day provides a lookout point with views of the Rhine Valley, the Palatinate Forest and the adjacent parts of Alsace.

The line first opened in 1888 by the Turmbergbahn Durlach AG, and in its original form used the water ballast system of propulsion, similar to that still used by the Nerobergbahn in Wiesbaden. Operation of the funicular was interrupted twice during World War II, once near the beginning, and again from 1945 to 1946. The line was comprehensively rebuilt in 1966, and the water ballast drive was replaced by a conventional electric drive. It was run by the Verkehrsbetriebe Karlsruhe, the operator of the Karlsruhe tram and bus system.

In 2019, it was decided to extend the tracks of the funicular railway to the foot of the hill bringing it closer to the terminal station of the tram in Durlach. On 29 December 2024, the Turmbergbahn closed, as the technical operating licence ran out the end of that year. The planned renewal and extension received its planning approval in November 2024 and the final decision by Karlsruhe city council to renew the system was taken on 21 January 2025.

The funicular had the following technical parameters:

- Length: 315 metres (1,033 ft)
- Height: 100 metres (328 ft)
- Maximum steepness: 36.2 %
- Configuration: single track with passing loop
- Journey time: 3 minutes
- Cars: 2
- Capacity: 52 passengers per car
- Track gauge: 1,000 mm (3 ft 3 3/8 in)
- Traction: Electricity

== See also ==
- List of funicular railways
