= Edeka =

German supermarket corporation

Edeka Gruppe Edeka Zentrale AG & Co. KG Edeka Group
- Type: Private
- Industry: Retail
- Founded: 25 November 1907; 118 years ago in Leipzig, Germany
- Headquarters: Hamburg, Germany
- Area served: Germany
- Key people: Markus Mosa (CEO); Gert Schambach; Reinhard Schütte
- Services: Cash & carry supermarket/warehouse club, convenience/forecourt store, discount store, electronics specialty, home improvement, hypermarket/supercenter/superstore, other specialty, supermarket
- Revenue: ▲US$67.1 billion (2019)
- Net income: ▲US$380.8 million (2019)
- Total assets: ▲US$8.844 billion (2019)
- Total equity: ▲US$2.252 billion (2019)
- Number of employees: 413,000 (2024)
- Website: www.edeka.de

The Edeka Group (German pronunciation: [ˈeːdeːka]) is the largest German supermarket corporation as of 2017, holding a market share of 25.3%. Founded in 1907, it currently consists of several co-operatives of independent supermarkets, all operating under the umbrella organisation Edeka Zentrale AG & Co KG, with headquarters in Hamburg. There are approximately 4,100 stores with the Edeka nameplate, ranging from small corner stores to hypermarkets. On 16 November 2007, Edeka reached an agreement with Tengelmann to purchase a 70% majority stake in Tengelmann's Plus discounter store division, which was then merged into Edeka's Netto brand, resulting in around 4,200 stores by 2018. Across all brands, the company operated a total of 13,646 stores at the end of 2017.

== History ==
The cooperative was founded in 1907 as the E.d.K. (Einkaufsgenossenschaft der Kolonialwarenhändler im Halleschen Torbezirk zu Berlin, Purchasing Cooperative of Colonial Goods Retailers in the Hallesches Tor district of Berlin). In 1911, it was renamed as Edeka, a phonetic expansion of the previous abbreviation. The Edekabank was founded in 1914 and, from 1923, central billing was introduced. Although the name contains "Berlin", the group was officially founded in Leipzig.

After the Second World War and the collapse of the Third Reich, the reconstruction of the store network was led from the new Hamburg central offices. In 1972, the cooperatives changed structure and formed twelve regional companies, the umbrella corporation and the Edekabank converting from a cooperative to a public limited company.

In 2001, the Edeka-owned budget brand Gut & Günstig (meaning "Good and Inexpensive") was founded. From 2003 to 2012 there was a collaboration with Globus SB-Warenhaus Holding.

During Christmas 2015, the company attracted worldwide attention with the highly sentimental TV commercial #heimkommen, about a lonely grandfather desperate to reunite with his family for Christmas. Intended only for the German public, it reached over 43 million views worldwide on YouTube by 18 December 2015, with nearly 62 million views by June 2019.

A cooperation with Telekom Germany and the brand Edeka smart started on 15 February 2018. It replaced the existing cooperation with Vodafone and EDEKA mobil.

A 2019 Mother's Day online commercial showing a series of clips of fathers interacting with their children incompetently, followed by shots of caring mothers with their children, and the punchline "Mum, thank you for not being dad", was criticized widely for its stereotypical portrayal of the roles of mothers and fathers. Gender researcher Stevie Schmiedel commented: "The commercial is pseudo-progressive. It divides and intensifies the fight between the sexes." Edeka was officially reprimanded by the Deutscher Werberat, the German advertising standards regulator, for breaching advertising standards by "reinforcing 1950s gender stereotypes", and while "ironic exaggeration is permissible, gender stereotyping is not". The authority also cited the large number of complaints and the debate about the commercial on social media, saying this showed that viewers either did not understand that it was meant to be ironic, or that they felt the ironic use of stereotypes was not acceptable to them.

== Brand names ==
Operational names of these stores include:

- nah und gut ("close and good") – stores up to 800 m^{2} (4300 sq ft), mostly found in smaller municipalities
- EDEKA aktiv markt ("active mart") – mostly privately run supermarkets between 400 m^{2} and 800 m^{2} (4300 and 8600 sq ft), mostly located in outlying neighborhoods and villages
- EDEKA neukauf – privately or centrally managed stores between 800 m^{2} and 2000 m^{2} (8600 and 21,500 sq ft)
- EDEKA – rebranded stores of aktiv markt and neukauf in most regions (e.g. all aktiv markt and neukauf stores of EDEKA Minden-Hannover and EDEKA Nord), regardless of whether privately or centrally managed stores
- EDEKA center (E-Center) – hypermarkets between 2000 m^{2} and 5000 m^{2} (21,500 and 54,000 sq ft)
- EDEKA C&C Großmarkt (Mios) (cash & carry)
- EDEKA Großverbraucherservice (for commercial customers)

Stores not operating under the Edeka brand, but belonging to the group nonetheless:

- SPAR (only in Germany)
- Netto Marken-Discount – discount stores
- Marktkauf – hypermarkets, mainly in the west of Germany
- diska – discount store brand of EDEKA Nordbayern-Sachsen-Thüringen
- NP. – discount store brand of EDEKA Minden-Hannover

Former brands were:

- aktiv discount – rebranded E-Center or EDEKA stores, mainly in northern Germany
- Bringmeister - online grocer
- Reichelt (later EDEKA Reichelt), mainly in Berlin, some stores in Brandenburg
- Treff 3000 – rebrandes as Netto Marken-Discount or EDEKA, discount store brand of EDEKA Südwest

Bringmeister was sold to Rockaway Capital in 2021 and acquired by Rohlik Group in 2023. Its Berlin operations were integrated into Knuspr in April 2024.

It also had holdings in Denmark, which were sold in 2009.

Edeka also operates a number of companies providing related services, for example the Edekabank.

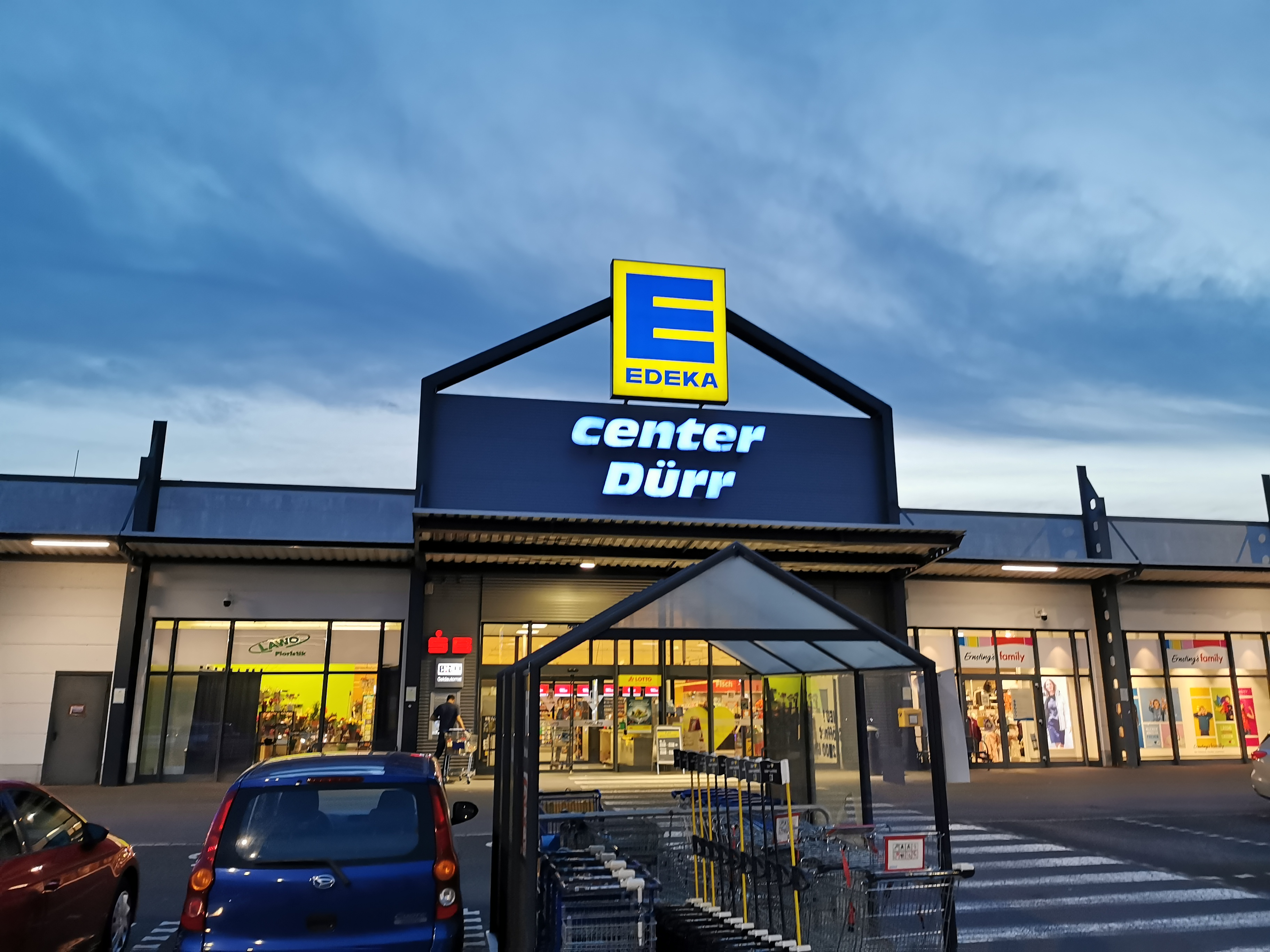
EDEKA center Dürr in Tauberbischofsheim

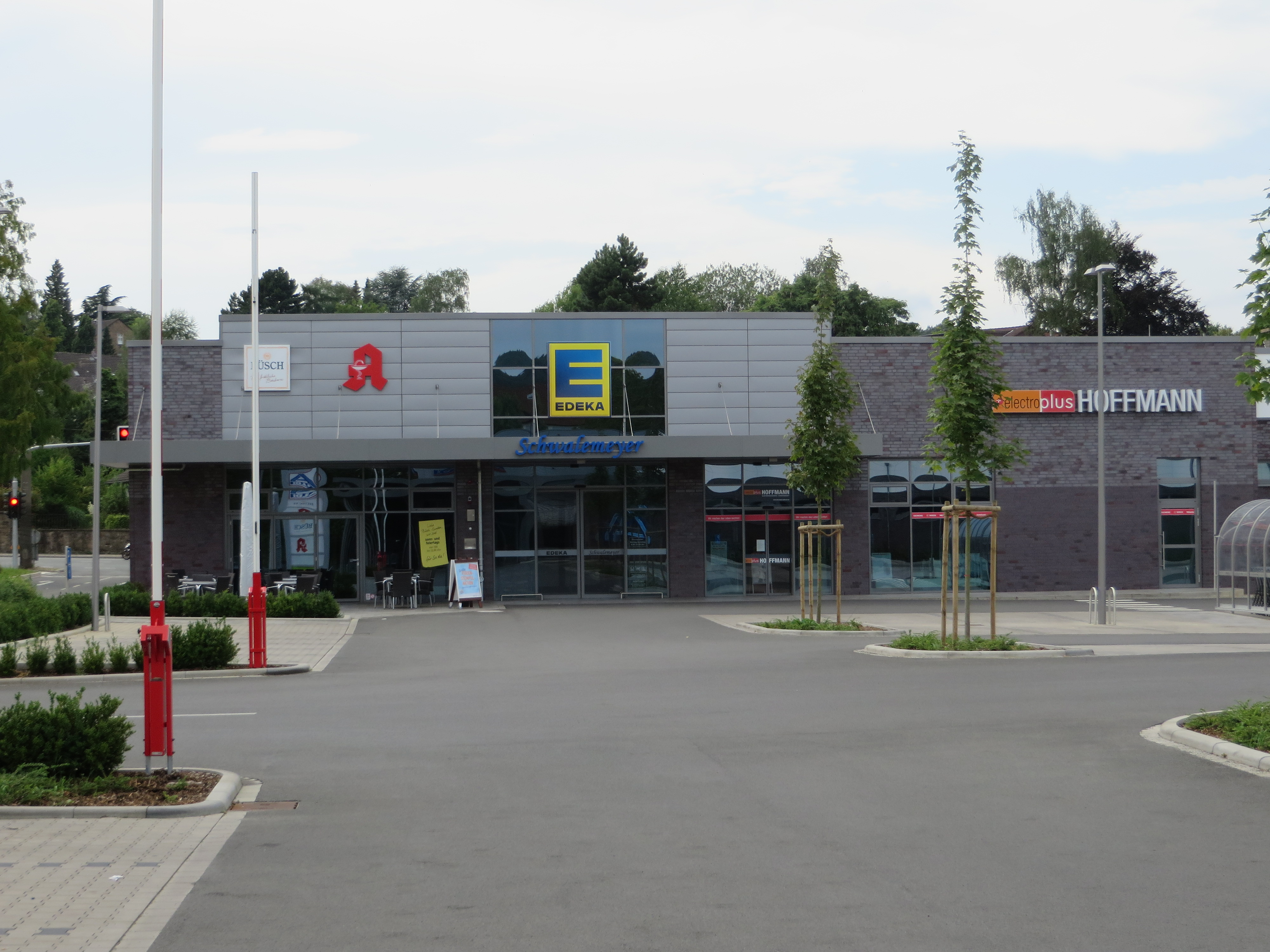
EDEKA Schwalemeyer in Witten

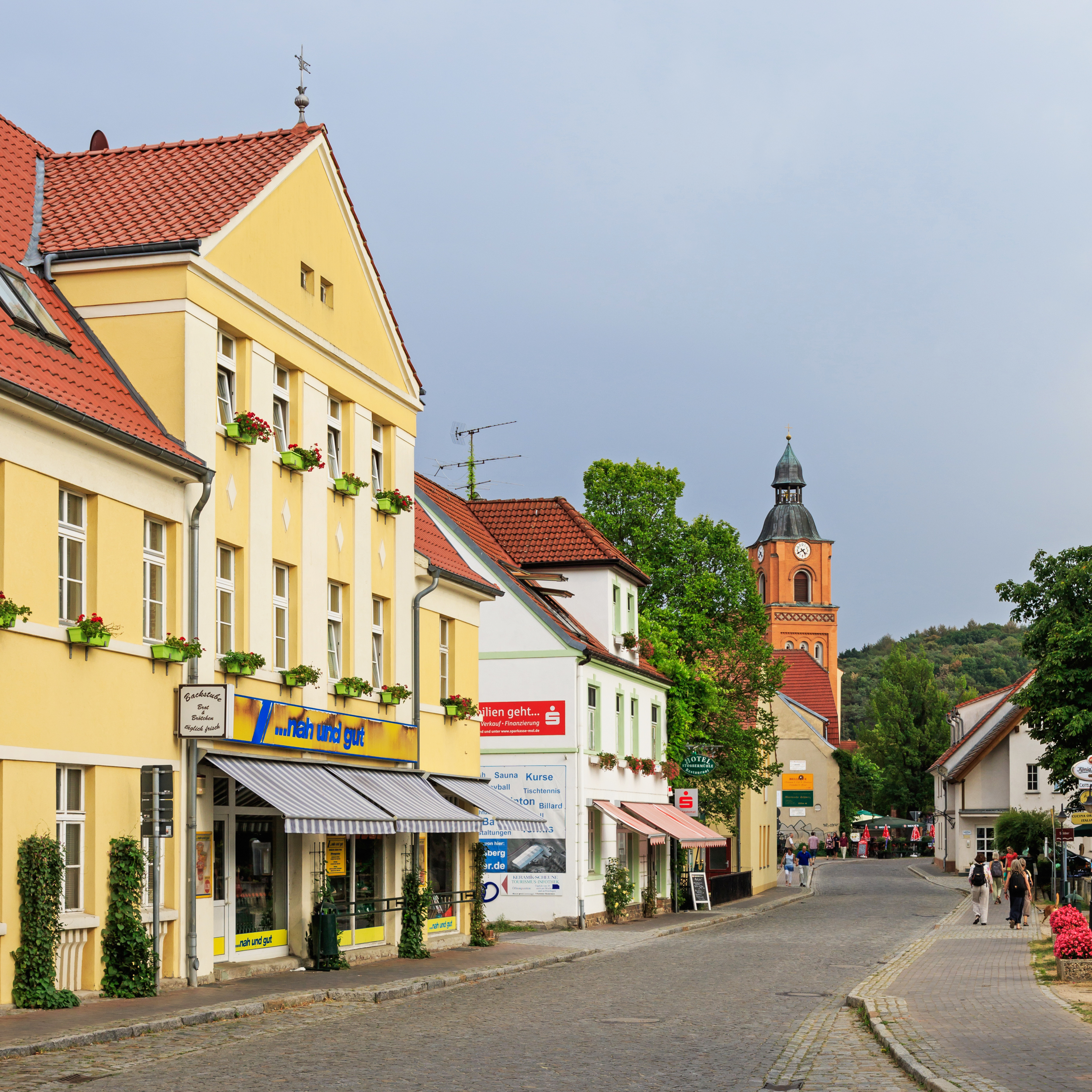
...nah und gut in Buckow
