= Turmberg =

Hil in Durlach, Germany

Coordinates: 48°59′48.40″N 8°29′07.70″E

Turmberg, Tower Hill
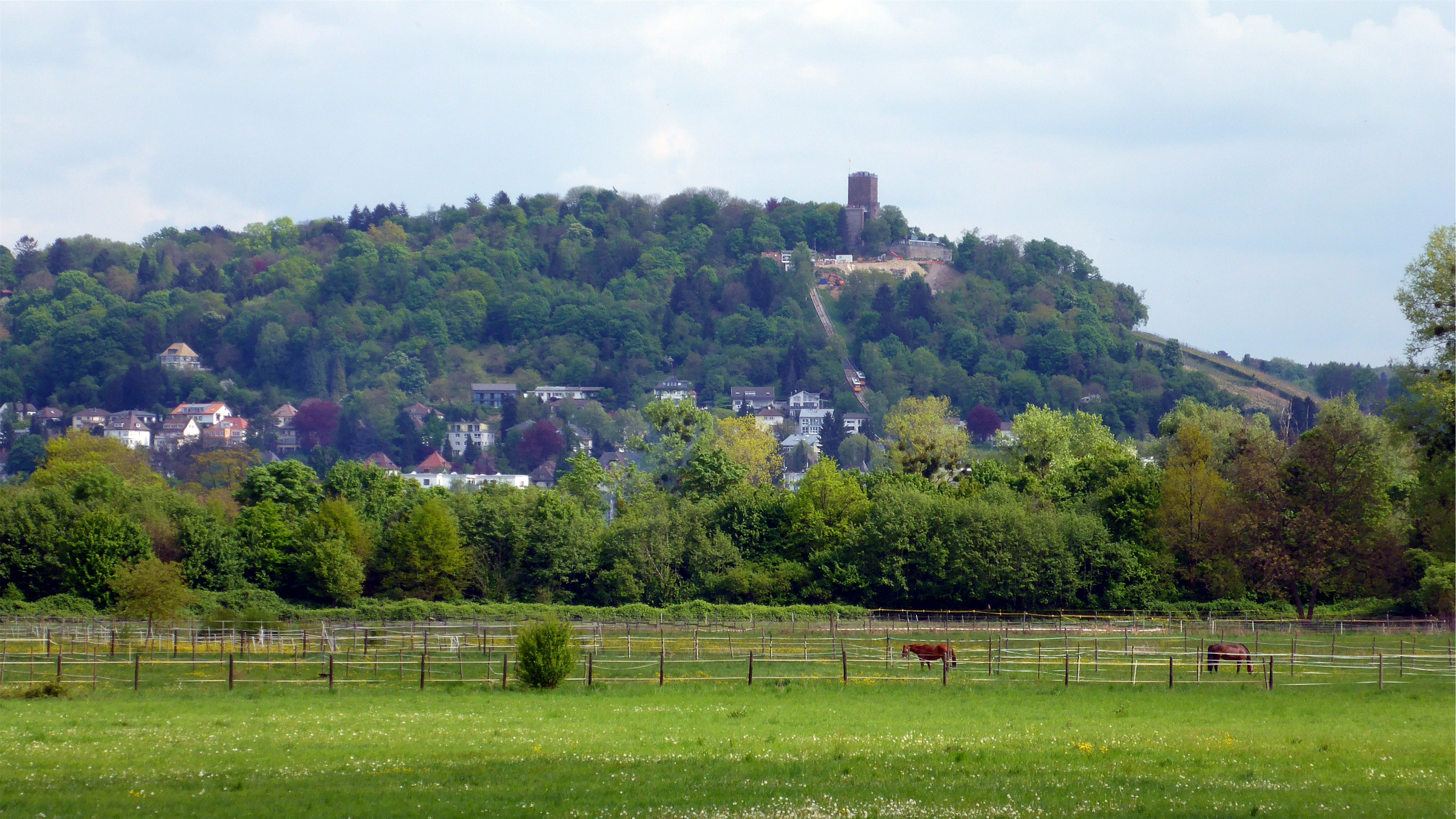

Geography

The Turmberg (German: "Tower Hill") is a hill (elevation: 256 m) located in Durlach, a suburb of Karlsruhe in Germany. It is home to a castle ruin.

The Turmberg is the local hill of Durlach, the former royal seat of Baden. It is 256 metres high and forms the nortwesternmost peak of the Black Forest at the transition between the low maintain range and the hilly landscape of the Kraichgau region. The Turmberg is a favourite destination for outings and can be reached by a number of routes. It can be reached by the Turmbergbahn, a funicular railway. This railway has been operating since 1888, and it is the oldest funicular railway still operating in Germany. The original railway used water to counterbalance the rail cars, but now it is run on electricity. The top of the hill can also be reached directly by climbing the 528 steps of the “Hexenstäffele”.

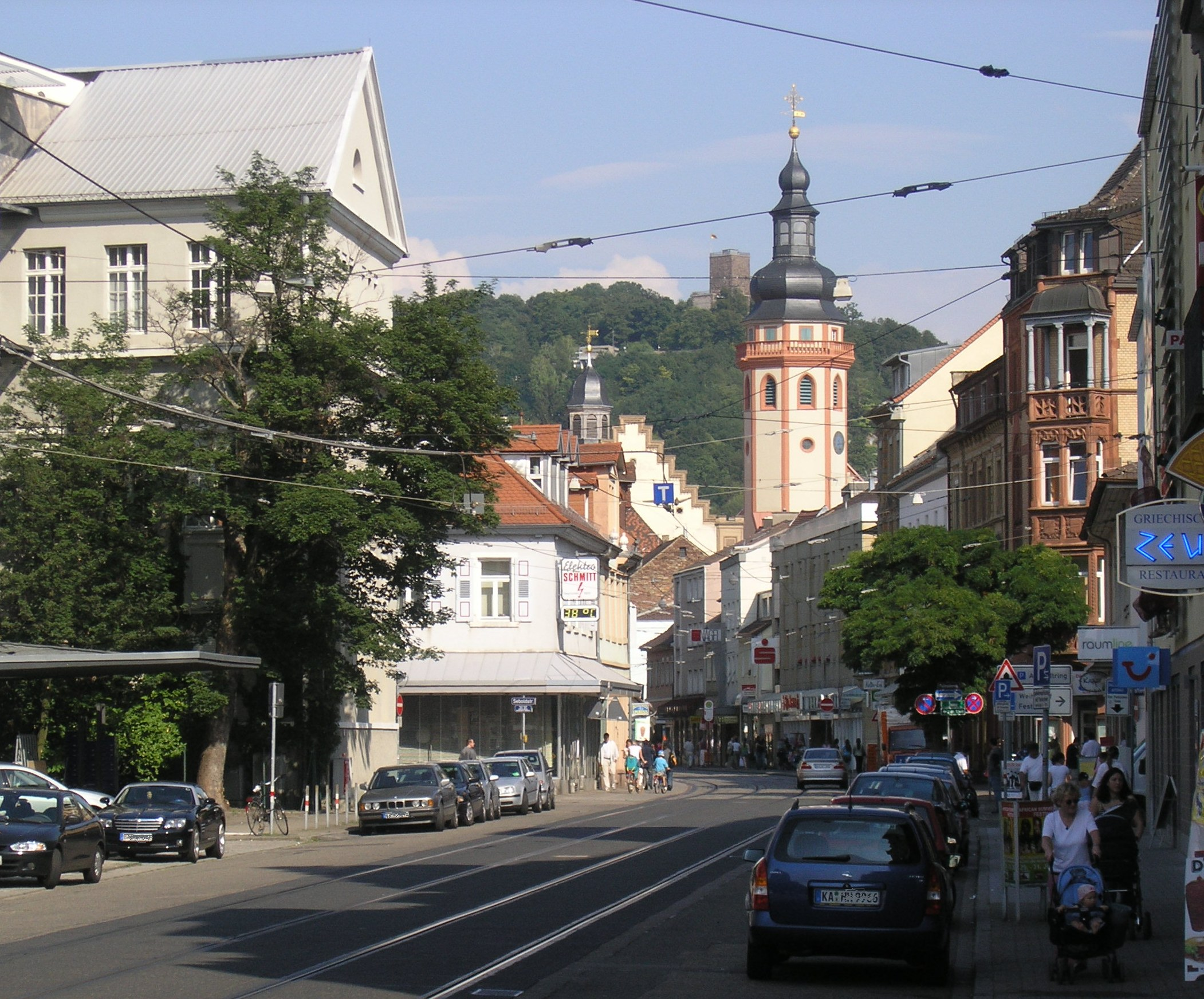
view from village center

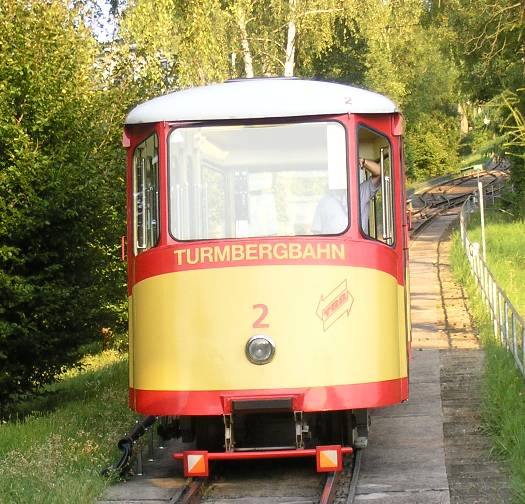
funicular

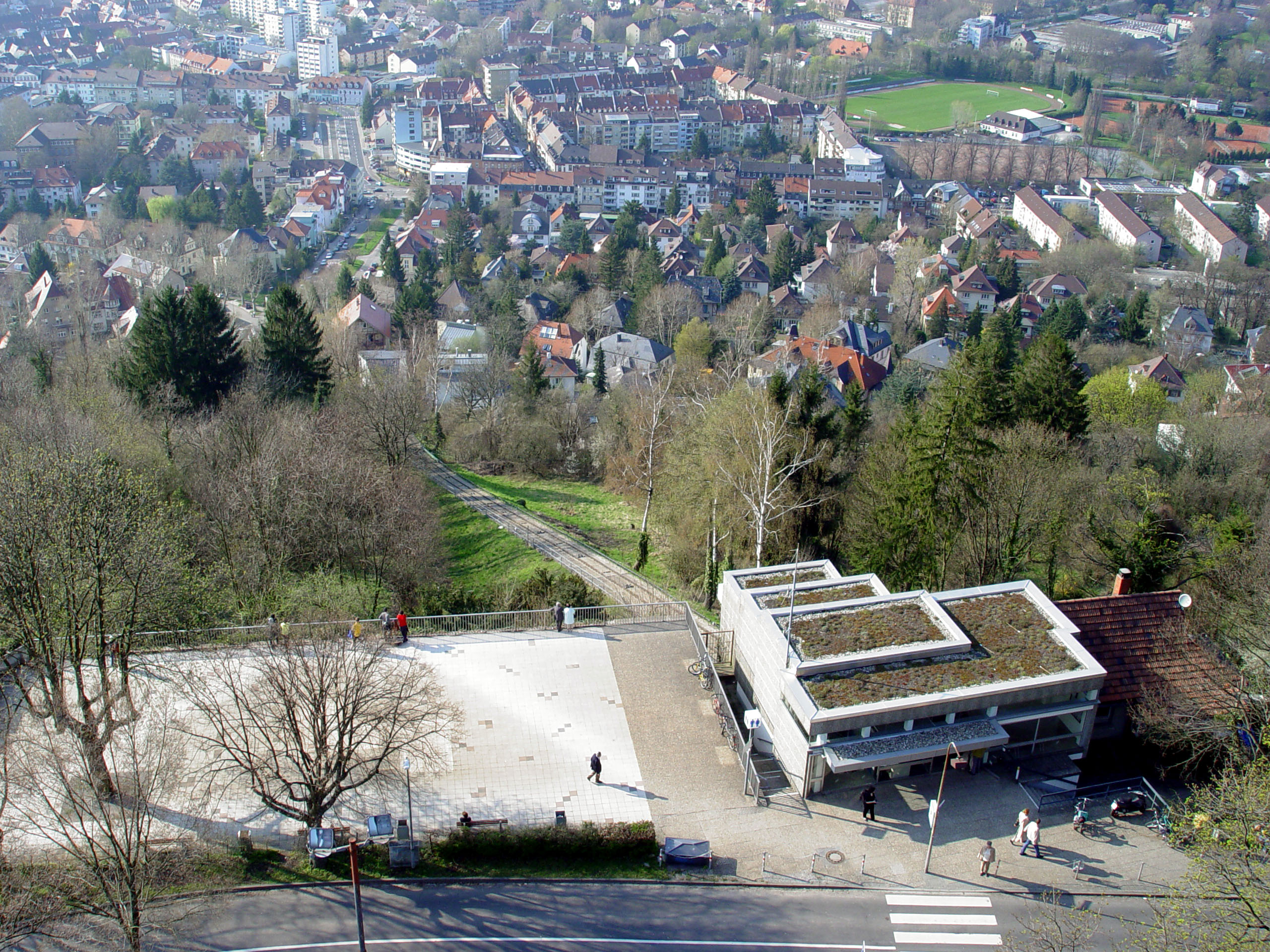
view downhill

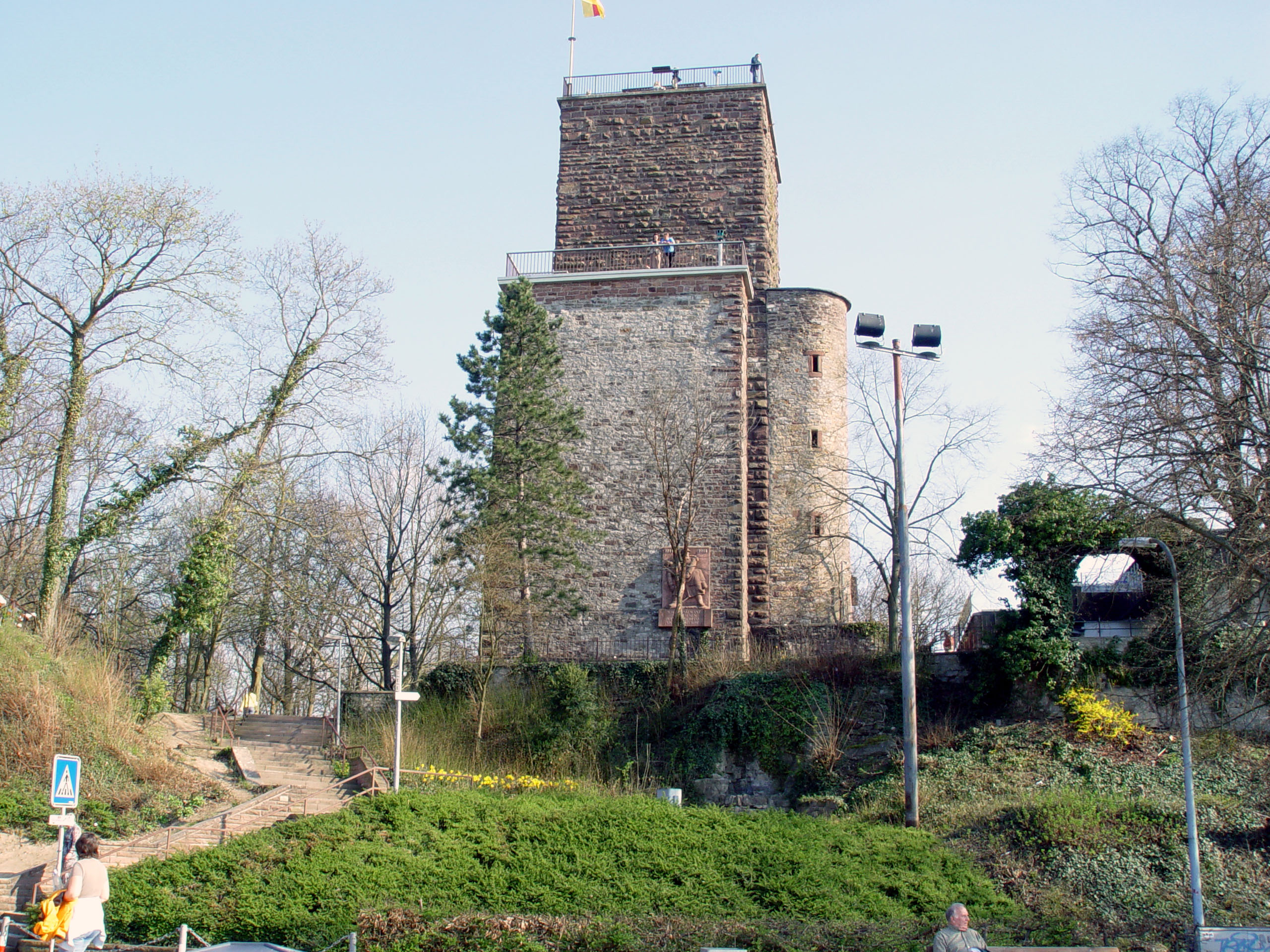
castle ruin
