= Atruvia =

IT service provider

Atruvia AG
- Company type: Aktiengesellschaft (AG)
- Industry: IT Services
- Headquarters: Karlsruhe, Baden-Württemberg, Germany
- Key people: Martin Beyer (chairman); Ulrich Coenen (chairman); Daniela Bücker; Birgit Frohnhoff; Jörg Staff; Ralf Teufel
- Number of employees: 4,608 (2020)
- Website: atruvia.de

Atruvia AG is the IT service provider of the German Cooperative Financial Group. The company based in Karlsruhe and Münster with further offices in Munich, Frankfurt and Berlin employs currently more than 4,600 staff (more than 6,700 including subsidiaries), generating an annual turnover of around 1.7 billion Euros.

Among Atruvia's customers are almost all members of the German Cooperative Financial Group, further companies from the Genossenschaftliche FinanzGruppe, as well as numerous private banks and companies from other business segments, such as the German automobile club (ADAC). Atruvia provides IT services for 169,000 banking work stations, administers roughly 82 million banking accounts and ensures comfortable cash supply by providing 34,000 ATMs and self-service terminals all across Germany. In its four high-security data processing centres.

== History ==
After talks concerning a possible merger of Fiducia IT AG (IT service provider for cooperative financial network in southern Germany, based in Karlsruhe) and GAD eG (the equivalent in northern Germany, based in Münster) had failed in previous years, negotiations were again picked up in late 2013. This time, both companies came to an agreement, resulting in the respective supervisory boards giving their assent in October 2014, followed by the owners of both companies in November and December 2014 respectively. The merger was finalized on 1 July 2015.

== Services offered ==
Atruvia currently operates two core banking applications "agree21" and "bank21". The banks associated with the former GAD eG currently employ the core banking application “bank21”, whereas the application used by those banks associated with the former Fiducia IT AG was called “agree”. By 2019 all German Volksbanks and Raiffeisenbanks are to be migrated to the new joint banking application “agree21”, which is primarily based on agree.

Atruvia AG also provides data centre services, a range of IT solutions including outsourcing, support and training, IT infrastructure services and hardware products.
