= Fiducia IT =

German IT-service provider

Fiducia IT AG
- Type: Aktiengesellschaft (AG)
- Industry: IT services
- Founded: 1924
- Defunct: 2015
- Fate: Merged
- Successor: Fiducia & GAD IT AG
- Headquarters: Baden-Württemberg, Germany
- Key people: Klaus-Peter Bruns (Chairman), Jens-Olaf Bartels, Wolfgang Eckert, Carsten Pfläging, Jörg Staff
- Products: See products listing
- Revenue: ▲$1,016.1 USD) (2012)
- Number of employees: 2,497 (AG); 3.015 (Konzern); (2013)
- Subsidiaries: ORGA GmbH; PERAS; Technology Services GmbH (TSG); 2CALL GmbH; ISB AG
- Website: fiducia.de

Fiducia IT AG was a German IT-service provider based in Karlsruhe. In 2015, it merged with the GAD eG to form Fiducia & GAD IT AG.

Its core business was providing financial IT services for co-operative banks, with its customers also coming from the private banking sector, public institutions, and free enterprises. Fiducial's integrated core banking system 'agree' was used by over 700 banks, supporting 97,000 workstations with 67 million accounts worldwide.

Fiducial IT AG’s headquarters were situated in Karlsruhe with a branch in Aschheim, Munich.

== History ==
=== Founding ===
The company was founded in 1924 under the name of Fiducia Accounting and Auditing Institute AG in Karlsruhe. "Fiducia" means trust, and assurance in Latin. In 1958 Fiducia came to the supervised banks with the idea of a merger into a reservation community. Fiducia took over the organization as a new business. During the following years, mainly punched cards were used. Over the course of the 1960s, a gradual transition took place to other media, such as journal strips, magnetic tapes and magnetic disks.

=== Fiducia online system ===
In the 1970s, Fiducia began to establish subsidiaries and participating interests in other companies, to serve the expanded customer base with industry-specific solutions and services. The Fiducia online method for interactive traffic was launched.

=== 2ATMs in dialog system ===
In the 1980s Fiducia supported automation of payments by installing ATMs in the dialogue system, started the development of a banking application procedure. The firm merged with the cooperative information center GIC, Mutterstadt, Information Center for Fiducia AG and inclusion of the reservation community Saar eG, Saarbrücken.

=== Agree bank workplace ===
After a further merger in 1999 with the GRK BG data center Kassel GmbH, and the RWG Rechenzentrale Wurttembergischer cooperatives GmbH, Stuttgart in 2001, Fiducia AG Karlsruhe / Stuttgart developed the Fiducia banking procedures together with the rbg Rechenzentrale Bavarian cooperatives eG. This bank method was based on the previous system NBS Fiducia, and united the parallel banking systems Rubin (GRK), GEBOS (CT) and GENOS (rbg) acquired from the many mergers. Therefore, it was called Agree (from the English word) and was released in 2003 for the first time in version 1.0. In the same year, the merger between Fiducia IT AG and rbg took place.

=== Other banks ===
In the following years, an increasing number of private banks joined the cooperative banks. According to market research firm Gartner in 2004, Fiducia developed into the seventh-largest IT service provider in Germany. In 2006 the PSD Bank made a decision to gradually migrate from Sparda (SDV) to agree, which happened by July 2008. In the same year, Fiducia introduced the mobileTAN procedure (mTAN). The locations of Kassel, Erfurt, Saarbrücken, and Nuremberg were closed.

=== Completion of migrations ===
Since 25 June 2007, all of the Fiducia IT AG supervised banks had migrated to the agree system. On 25 August, Fiducia put a newly designed IT center into operation, which met the guidelines of BS7799 and ISO17799. In September Fiducia received the Silver Safety Award from Baden-Württemberg for "outstanding projects of occupational safety". This was awarded for the Security Awareness campaign with the name of "Security Cup 2007".

On 21 February 2008, Fiducia put their new data center in Rheinstetten near Karlsruhe into operation. As of March 17, 2008, the first 15 banks of PSD (PSD Bank Nord eG) were successfully migrated to agree and were using the Fiducia eBanking system.

=== Merger with GAD eG ===
In early 2006, exploratory talks began with the IT service provider GAD eG about a possible merger, which failed. Subsequently, in January 2008, a merger in 2010 was promised.

With massive pressure from the owners of both companies and with the objective of saving costs, merger talks began again in September 2011. The Federal Cartel Office approval of the merger was announced in late May 2012, however, talks ended in July 2012 due to differences in company valuation. Fresh talks began at the end of 2013, resulting in the successful merger in 2015.

== Structure ==
=== Subsidiary companies ===
The subsidiaries of Fiducia included:

- PERAS GmbH – Service provider for HR Services: payroll, time management, personnel management, archiving, personnel cost planning, statistics and certificates.
- Technologie Services GMBH (TSG) – Installation / implementation, maintenance / repair, migration / replacement of the bank's hardware and video surveillance / access control for bank offices.
- Parc IT GmbH – Software for earnings and risk management in banks, solutions for enterprise risk management. The company is based in Rheinauhafen Cologne.

Former subsidiaries:

- 2Call GmbH was taken over in 2012 by the holding company F-Call AG.

=== Investments ===
Fiducia had stakes in the following companies:

- F-Call AG – Telephone call services such as emergency and overflow concepts, acquisition of the bank's internal telephone exchange, business processes, such as telephone banking, securities and legitimation services and comprehensive customer service solutions for the cooperative financial services network.
- CardProcess GmbH – Credit card processing, debit card processing, POS network, POS acquiring
- Giropay GmbH – Provider of online payment procedure giropay
- VR Financial Services GmbH – Back office services, securities services und payment solutions for banks in the cooperative financial services network

== Services offered ==
=== Banksystem Agree ===
Logo of Agree

Agree, a banking system developed and maintained by Fiducia, is a modular total banking procedure. It is based on the former NBS banking system and was created by consolidating the GEBOS, GENOS and RUBIN systems. Fiducia Agree is not only the backend systems in the data center and the front-end system "Agree bank workplace" (Agree BAP) on Java Web Start technology but also other services and software products. These include additional application programs such as COSMOS, Agree Analyses and VR Control. For all IT solutions, Fiducia offers extensive support for the implementation and optimization of the applications in the form of consulting, training and coaching.

Agree became an free iPhone app in June 2010 it is also a free, making it possible to list transactions, perform transfers and view portfolios on mobile devices.

=== Processing centers ===
Fiducia operates two active and fully redundant data centers with more than 8,700 Unix servers in the Karlsruhe area.

The data centers are equipped with an emergency power system and are run completely independently.

A high-security data center with a high degree of automation, focusing on protection from failures and attacks, was put into operation in 2008 in the Rhine Stetten (district of Karlsruhe). The new data center comprises around 6,720 square meters of space for IT equipment. In the first phase, about 60% will be occupied. The new data center is located approximately 10 km away from the backup data center.

=== MPLS network ===
(As of 2012)

Fiducia claims to have one of the largest MPLS networks to communicate with the local systems of its partner banks.

Transmission speeds	128 kbit/s to 600 Mbit/s (on average 7.4 Mbit/s)
Network components	8,350 routers, 9,000 switches
Network security	154 firewalls, 46 proxies and virus scanners
Agree Voice (VoIP telephony)	15,100 Ports
Internet customers	Internet- and VPN-access for about 3.8 million online customers

=== Outsourcing ===
- Outsourcing and Technical Computing operation: Fiducia provides the computing infrastructure and administers the hardware including the system oriented software. The goal is to make it possible for the customer to concentrate on its core business.
- Application Outsourcing: With service package "Application Outsourcing" the company maintains the standard and custom applications of their customers.
- Business Process Outsourcing: The outsourcing services of Fiducia includes business process outsourcing (BPO).

=== Giropay ===
Together with the Postbank, Star Financial and GAD, Fiducia is the founder of Fiducia Giropay GmbH, suppliers of the online payment process of the same name. Fiducia is also, together with GAD, responsible for the technical and operational implementation of the payment procedure in the cooperative banks.

=== Printing and mailing ===
The Printing and Mailing services include custom printing and enveloping services, mail, electronic signature, archiving and invoice receipt processing.

- Data transfer via the Internet, ISDN, disk or leased line
- Data under strict privacy activities (banking secrecy)
- Print, cut, folding, insertion of invoice documents, formal notices, wage and salary slips, mailings
- Postage Optimization
- Sold by Postal Service/Courier Service
- Internal Tracking
- Optional: legal electronic invoices with electronic signature and archiving

As of 2012 Fiducia operates for 1,500 customers:

- 22 printing systems with a capacity of 14,200 pages per minute
- 13 envelope routes with a capacity of up to 52,000 envelopes per hour

In 2012, approximately 523 million DIN-A4 pages were printed and 177 million printed letters were enveloped and sent.

== Discontinued Activities ==
=== Internet & Telephone Services VR-Web ===
Fiducia was the operator of the Internet service provider VR-Web, which completed its business operations in 2012. The main target group of VR-Web were customers and employees of the local cooperative banks and other cooperative institutions. VR-Web and VR-Web Phone offered Internet access and landline telephones. From 1 December 2010, however, the service was available only for existing customers and on 30 November 2012, the business was finally stopped.

== Sponsorship ==
Fiducia IT AG is the main and title sponsor of the Baden marathon. In addition, the company has sponsored the Karlsruher SC since the 2005/2006 season (since 2010/2011 as the exclusive sponsor), and the open-air event "Classic at the tower."
