= Old Protestant Church of Wilferdingen =

Old Evangelical Church
- Alte Evangelische Kirche
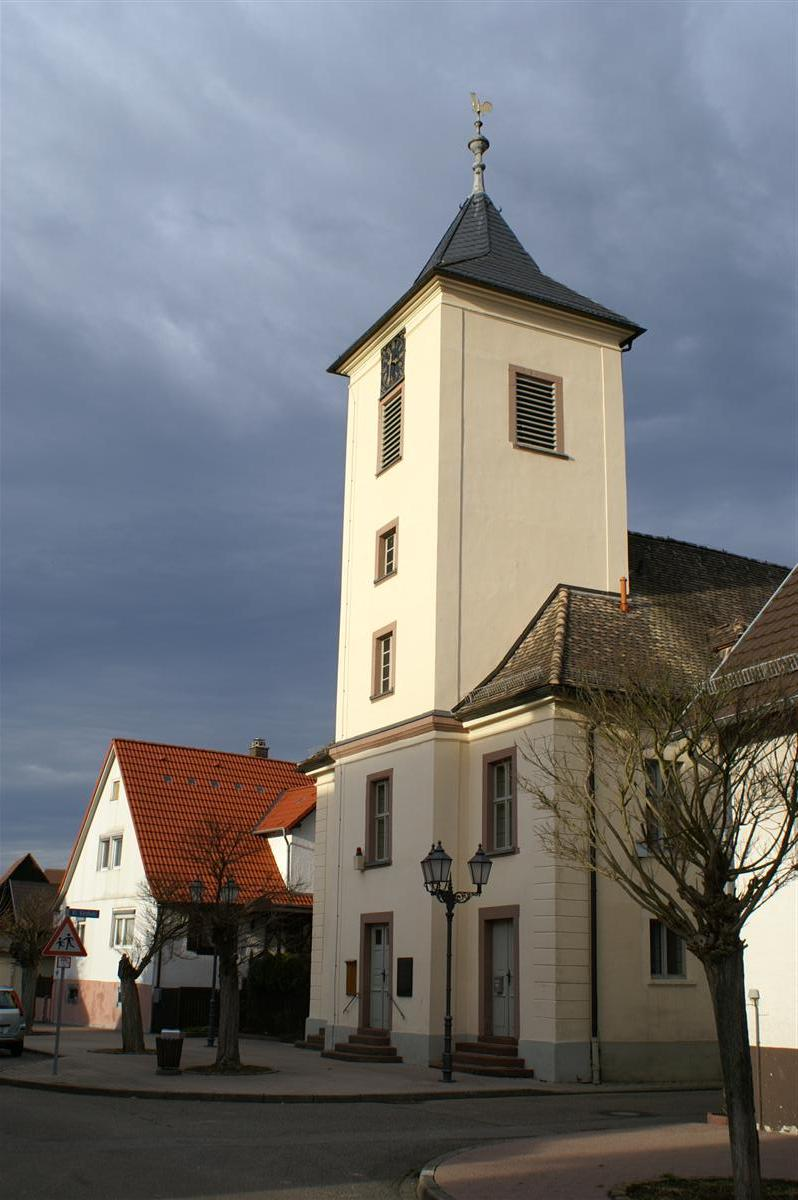
- The Old Evangelical Church in Wilferdingen
- Old Evangelical Church
- 48.943981°N 8.577127°E
- Location: Wilferdingen, Remchingen, Enzkreis, Baden-Württemberg, Germany
- Country: Germany
- Denomination: Evangelical

History
- Status: Cultural center

Architecture
- Style: Early Classicism

Specifications
- Materials: Stone, slate

The Old Protestant Church of Wilferdingen (German: Alte Evangelische Kirche Wilferdingen) is a former historical Evangelical parish church, now used as a cultural center, located in Wilferdingen, a district of the municipality of Remchingen in the Enzkreis district of Baden-Württemberg, Germany.

The building is registered as a cultural heritage monument by the State Office for Monument Preservation Baden-Württemberg (Landesamt für Denkmalpflege Baden-Württemberg).

It originally belonged to the Wilferdingen parish in the Evangelical Church of Baden and was later replaced by the newly built Christuskirche.

== Description ==
The early Neoclassical hall church was constructed between 1784 and 1786 under Margrave Karl Friedrich.

It consists of a two-storey nave, a recessed chancel to the east, and a church tower integrated almost entirely into the western part of the nave.

The upper levels of the tower contain the clock and the belfry with three church bells. The tower is topped by an octagonal slate-covered helm roof.

Inside, the church features galleries on three sides and a pulpit altar.

The preservation of the church is maintained by a local heritage association.

== Literature ==
- Georg Dehio, Handbook of German Art Monuments: Baden-Württemberg I, Regierungsbezirke Stuttgart und Karlsruhe. Munich: Deutscher Kunstverlag, 1993, p. 862.
