= Stockmühlsee =

Lake in Remchingen, Baden-Württemberg, Germany

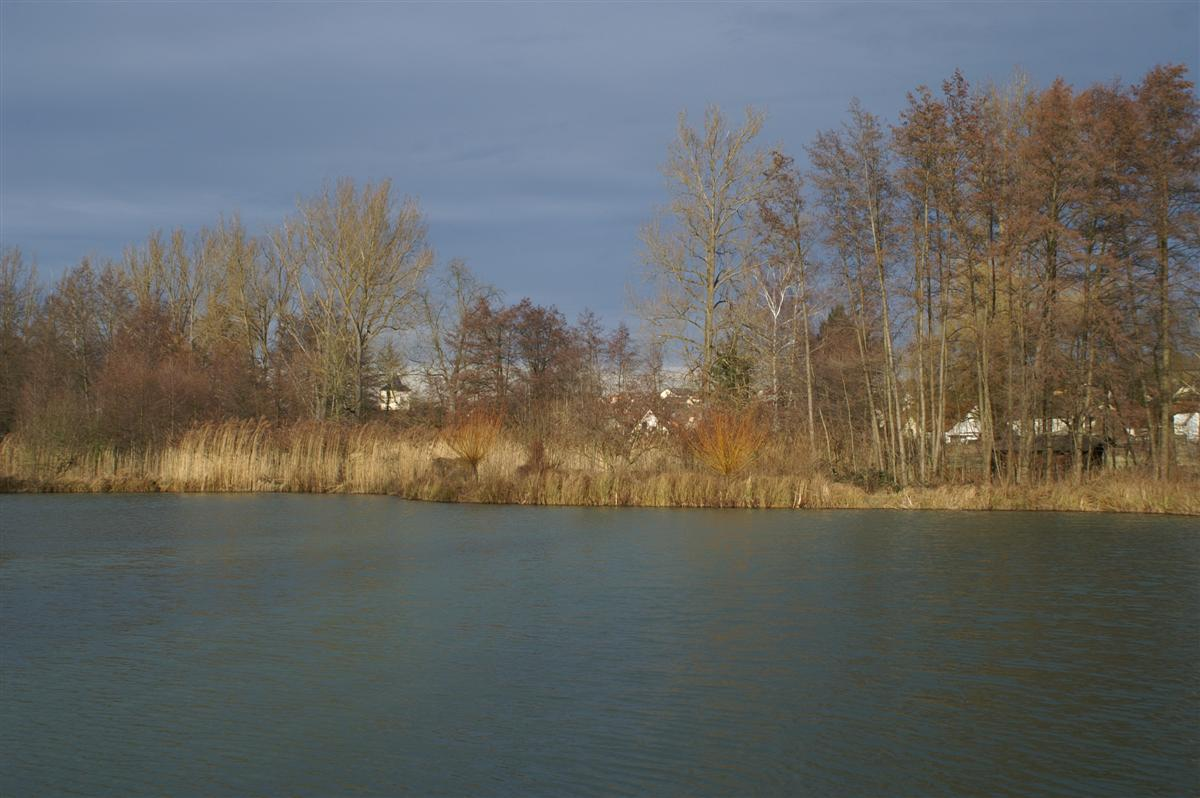
- The Stockmühlsee in Wilferdingen

- Location: Remchingen, Enzkreis, Baden-Württemberg (Germany)
- Coordinates: 48.940480°N 8.575837°E
- Max. width: 50 m (160 ft)
- Surface area: 0.5583 ha (1.380 acres)
- Surface elevation: 160 m (520 ft)
- Islands: 1

The Stockmühlsee (Lake Stockmühl) is a small lake located in Remchingen in the Enz district of Baden-Württemberg, Germany.

== Location ==
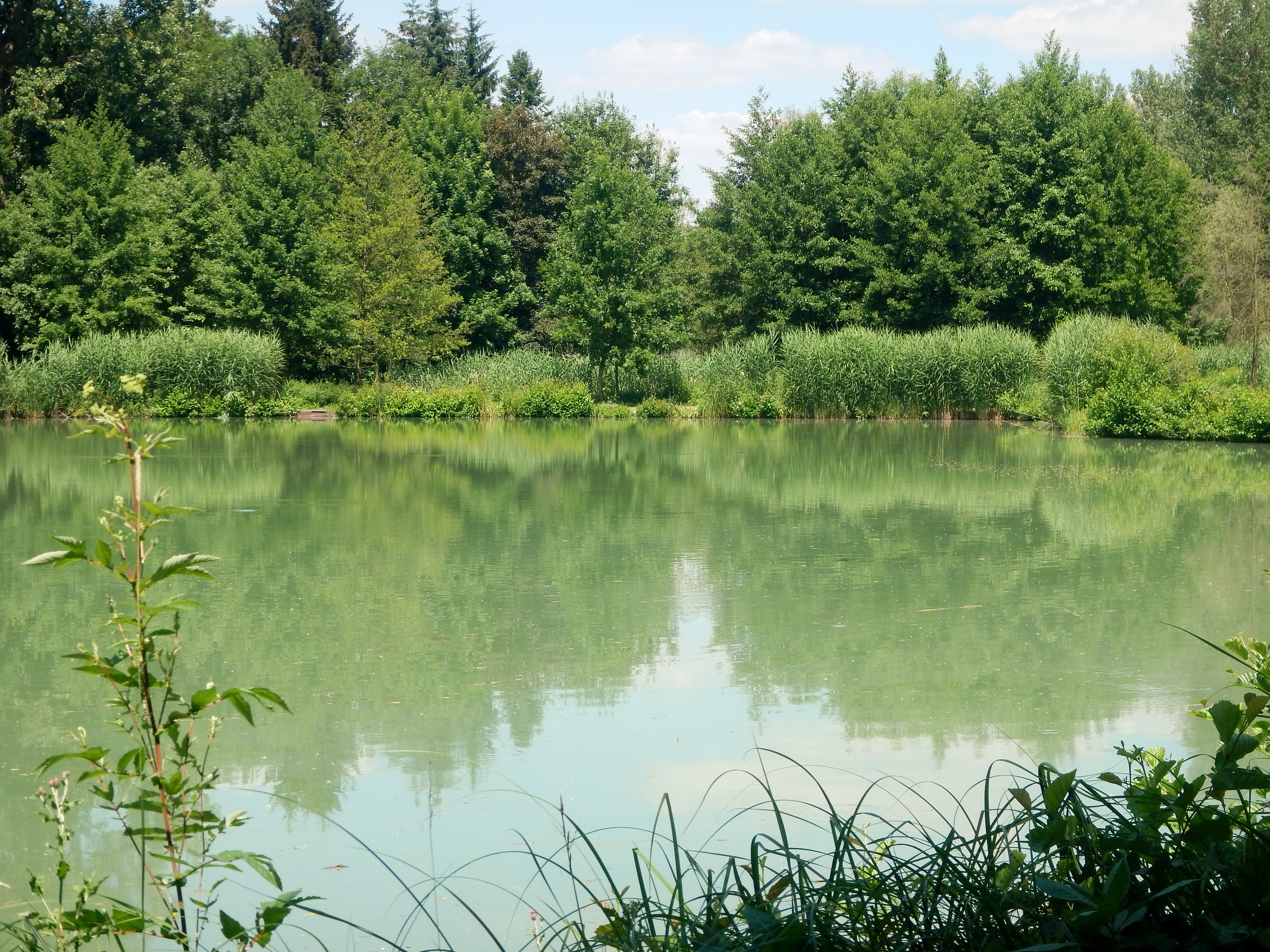

The lake is situated on the outskirts of Wilferdingen, a district of Remchingen, near the forest Frauenwald. It lies along a cycle path leading toward Nöttingen and is parallel to the Pfinz river. Opposite the Stockmühlsee is the so-called Fischerteich (Fisher lake), which features the clubhouse of the local fishing association called Fischerverein Wilferdingen. A walking path circles the lake.

== Geography ==
The Stockmühlsee has a surface area of approximately 0.56 hectares. A small island is located near its center.

== Fauna ==
The invasive North American spinycheek crayfish (Faxonius limosus) has been introduced into the lake and is now established there. Although the species has spread within the waterbody, no negative ecological effects have been observed so far.
