= Jeff S. Klotz =

German author & publisher (born 1990)

Jeff Stephan Klotz-von Eckartsberg (born 1990 in Pforzheim) is a German writer and entrepreneur. He lived in Schloss Bauschlott (municipality of Neulingen) where he ran the J. S. Klotz Verlagshaus (publishing company) for which he had to file for insolvency in March 2025. From 2009 to 2019 he was active in local politics in Remchingen. Jeff Klotz is active in the Protestant Church. Since 2020 he has been a member of the State Synod of the Evangelischen Landeskirche in Baden and since 2021 also a member of the Synode der Evangelical Church in Germany (EKD).

== Life and work ==
Jeff Klotz grew up in Remchingen and Copenhagen and studied history, Classical Archeology and Ancient and Early History at Heidelberg University.

In 2008 he helped found the Roemermuseum (Roman museum) Remchingen which he ran as a volunteer until 2025.

He directed J. S. Klotz Publishing in Neulingen, which declared bankruptcy in 2025. He was also involved in a cooperation with Lessing-Gymnasium Karlsruhe for which he organised events and excursions with archeological and historical themes.

In 2016 he received an archeology promotion award from Baden-Württemberg. The main focus of his research lies in building research, architectural and church history.

He is a member of the church district council and of the area synod of the Enz area, the state synod of the Evangelic Church in Baden and the synod of the Evangelic Church in Germany (EKD).

== Publications (selection) ==
- With Marlis Zeus: Die ersten Christen im Nordschwarzwald.(The First Christians in the Northern Black Forest) Arte Factum, Karlsruhe 2014, ISBN 978-3-938560-33-4.
- Die Römer in Remchingen. Funde und Befunde des 1. bis 3. Jahrhunderts in Remchingen und Umgebung. (The Romans in Remchingen. Discoveries and Findings from the 1st to 3rd centuries AD in Remchingen and the surrounding area) Verlag J. S. Klotz, Remchingen 2015, ISBN 978-3-946231-01-1.
- with Marlis Zeus: Frauen im Aufbruch 1910–1920. Kaiserreich – Weltkrieg – Republik. (The awakening (emancipation?) of Women 1910–1920. German Empire - World War - Republic) Verlag J. S. Klotz, Remchingen 2015, ISBN 978-3-946231-02-8.
- Die Römer in Pforzheim und im Enzkreis. Einblicke in die provinzialrömische Kultur im Pforzheimer Raum. (The Romans in Pforzheim and in the Enz area. An insight in the culture of Roman provinces in the Pforzheim area) Verlag J. S. Klotz, Remchingen 2015, ISBN 978-3-946231-00-4.
- as co-author: Religion im Wandel. Vorgeschichte – Römer – Mittelalter. Religionsgeschichte am Oberrhein. (Changes in Religion. Prehistory – Romans – Middle Ages. History of Religion in the Upper Rhine Area) Verlag J. S. Klotz, Remchingen 2016, ISBN 978-3-946231-05-9.
- with Ewald Freiburger: Kirchen und Klöster im Nordschwarzwald. Ein Überblick zur Kirchengeschichte im Raum Karlsruhe und Pforzheim. (Churches and Monasteries in the Northern Black Forest. An Overview of Church History in the Karlsruhe and Pforzhein Area) Verlag J. S. Klotz, Remchingen 2017, ISBN 978-3-946231-06-6.
- Schloss Bauschlott. Die Geschichte eines markgräflichen Hausgutes. (Bauschlott Castle. The Story of a Margrave Estate) Verlag J. S. Klotz, Remchingen 2018.
- Schlösser und Burgen in Karlsruhe, Pforzheim, im Kraichgau und im Nordschwarzwald. (Castles and Forts in Karlsruhe, Pforzheim, Kraichgau and the Northern Black Forest) Verlag J. S. Klotz, Remchingen 2018, ISBN 978-3-946231-15-8.
- with Marlis Zeus: Frauen im Aufbruch. Der lange Weg zum modernen Frauenwahlrecht. (Women's Emancipation: The Long Path to today's voting rights for women) Verlag J. S. Klotz, Remchingen 2018.
- with Carolin Dieckmann: Das Schloss Pforzheim und die Schlosskirche. (Pforzheim Castle and the Castle Church) Verlag J. S. Klotz, Remchingen 2018, ISBN 978-3-946231-09-7.
- Pforzheim. Ein Stadtführer. (Pforzheim. A city guide) Verlag J. S. Klotz, Remchingen 2019, ISBN 978-3-948424-16-9.
- Die Kirchenburgen von Ellmendingen und Dietlingen. (The Fortified Churches of Ellmendingen and Dietlingen) Verlag J. S. Klotz, Remchingen 2019, ISBN 978-3-946231-21-9.
- with Holger Müller: Die Evangelische Kirche Staffort. Ein paradiesisches Gesamtkunstwerk aus Neogotik und Jugendstil. (The Reformatic Church in Staffort. A Heavenly Synthesis of Building Art) Verlag J. S. Klotz, Neulingen 2019, ISBN 978-3-948424-04-6.
- Mythos Jerusalem. Der Oberrhein und das Heilige Land, (Mythical Jerusalem. The Upper Rhine and the Holy Land) Neulingen 2018, ISBN 978-3-946231-11-0
- with Markus Mall: Die evangelische Stephanuskirche in Kieselbronn, (The Reformatic Stephen's Church in Kieselbronn) J.S. Klotz Verlagshaus, Bauschlott 2020, ISBN 978-3948424701.
- with Mathias Kraft: Die Evangelische Michaelskirche Gräfenhausen, (The Reformatic Michael Church in Graefenhausen) J.S. Klotz Verlagshaus, Bauschlott 2020, ISBN 978-3-948424-89-3

== Honours ==
- Archeological Promotion Award 2016 of the State of
