= Pfinztal Bridge =

A 8 Pfinztal Bridge Pfinztalbrücke
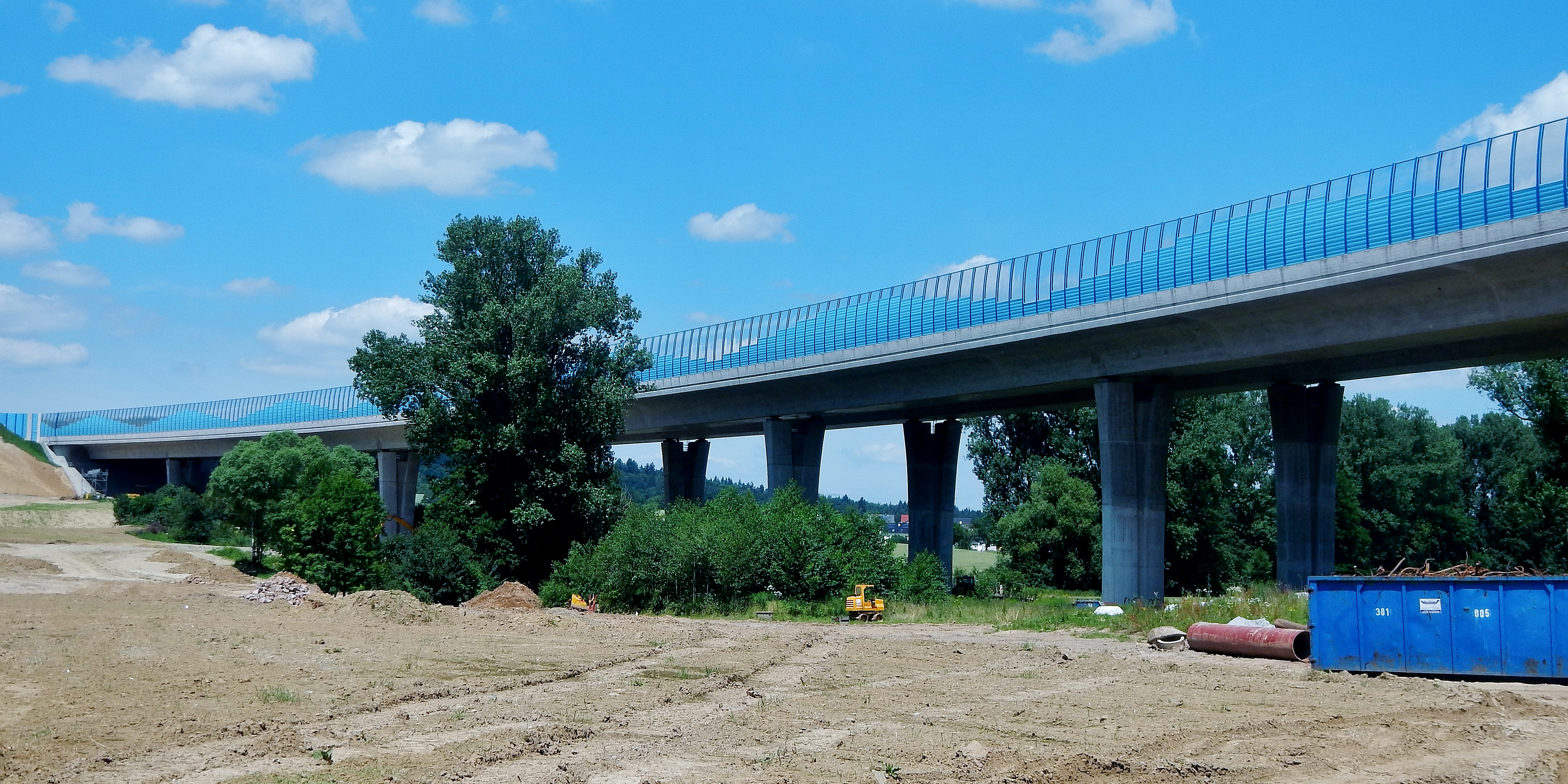
- Pfinztal Bridge
- Coordinates: 48°56′2.33″N 8°34′14.64″E
- Carries: Bundesautobahn 8
- Crosses: Pfinz
- Locale: Remchingen, Baden-Württemberg, Germany

Characteristics
- Design: Prestressed concrete beam bridge
- Total length: 470 m
- Height: 25 m

History
- Construction start: 2010
- Construction end: 2014
- Opened: 2014

The Pfinztal Bridge (German: Pfinztalbrücke) is a 470 m long prestressed concrete beam bridge on the Bundesautobahn 8 (A8) in Remchingen-Nöttingen in the Enzkreis district of Baden-Württemberg, Germany. It spans the Pfinz valley at a height of about 25 m and was constructed as part of the six-lane widening of the A8 between Karlsbad and Pforzheim-West.

== History ==
=== Background ===
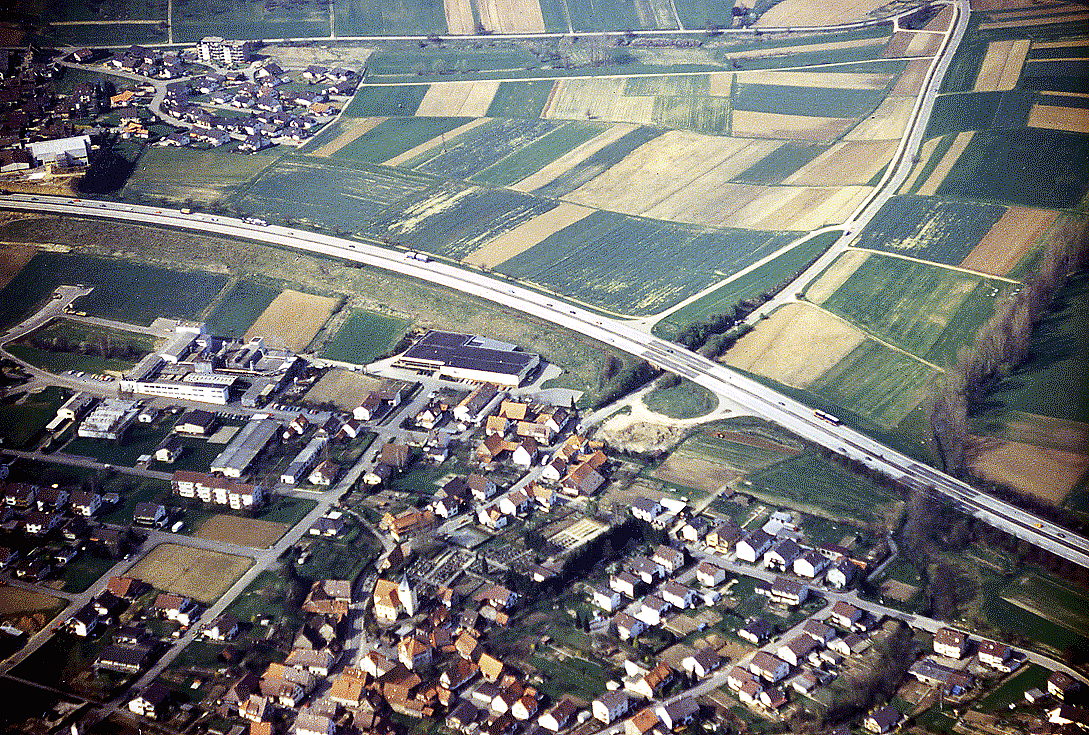
"Nöttinger Senke" in 1990

Since the construction of the A8 in the 1930s, the motorway between the Karlsbad and Pforzheim-West interchanges passed through the steep and winding "Nöttinger Senke" (Nöttingen hollow), a section of the Pfinz valley near Nöttingen. The section was particularly steep and curvy, posing a major challenge, especially for heavy goods vehicles. Numerous serious and fatal accidents occurred over the decades, particularly on the downhill direction towards Karlsruhe, where drivers frequently rear-ended others or lost control. German actress Gisela von Collande died in 1960 in a serious crash in the Nöttinger Senke.

Despite the known dangers, the alignment remained unchanged for decades. With the six-lane A8 expansion, a bypass became inevitable. By the early 2000s, discussions began on alternatives to improve safety. The final plan called for a new bridge over the Pfinz valley, about 25 m high, which was considered safer, more durable and more economical to operate.

=== Construction ===
Work began in May 2010. The bridge was constructed using the incremental launching method, with sections built at the eastern abutment and pushed onto the piers in 30 m segments every 10–14 days. In July 2011, one northern pier was found to have insufficient strength due to faulty concrete (excess water content) and had to be partially demolished and rebuilt. Despite this setback, the construction stayed on schedule.

The new alignment over the bridge was opened to traffic in September 2014. The old Nöttinger Senke route was then closed and dismantled.

=== Aftermath and impact ===
The former roadway through the valley was completely removed. The area was renatured and partially paved, with some sections converted into a mixed-use pedestrian and cycle path. The project greatly improved traffic flow and reduced noise pollution in Nöttingen. Today, traffic crosses the bridge with much less congestion and accident risk.
