= Remchingen =

German municipality

- Municipality
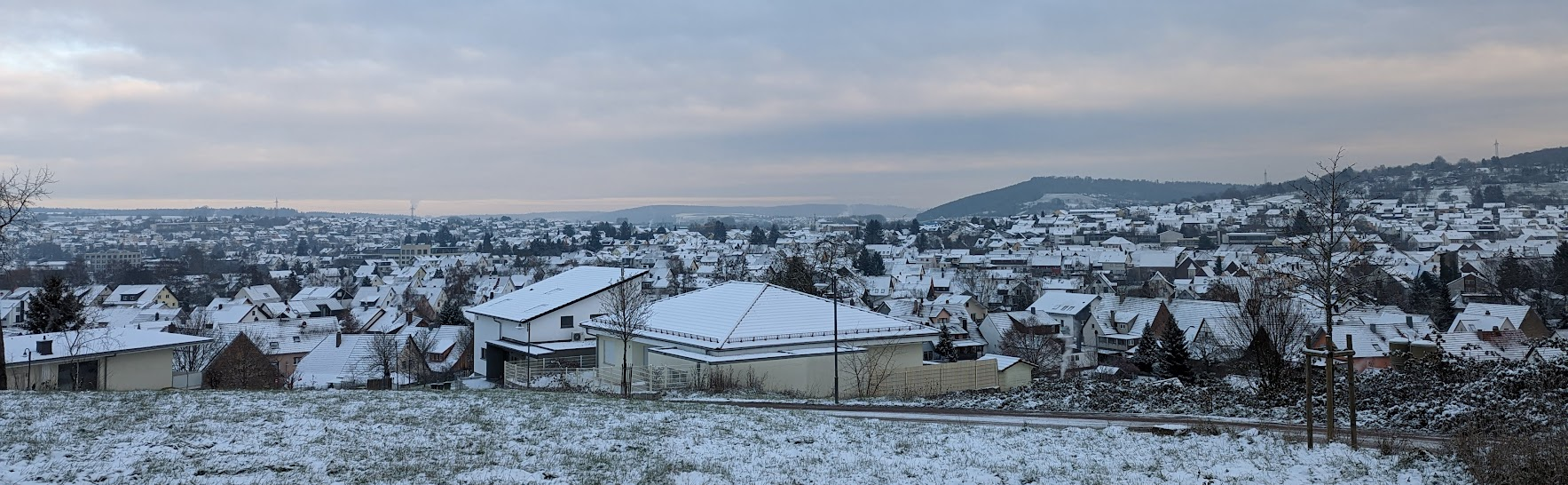

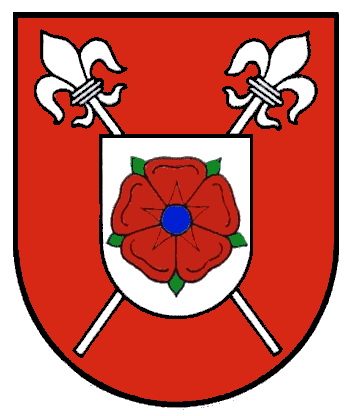
- Flag Coat of arms

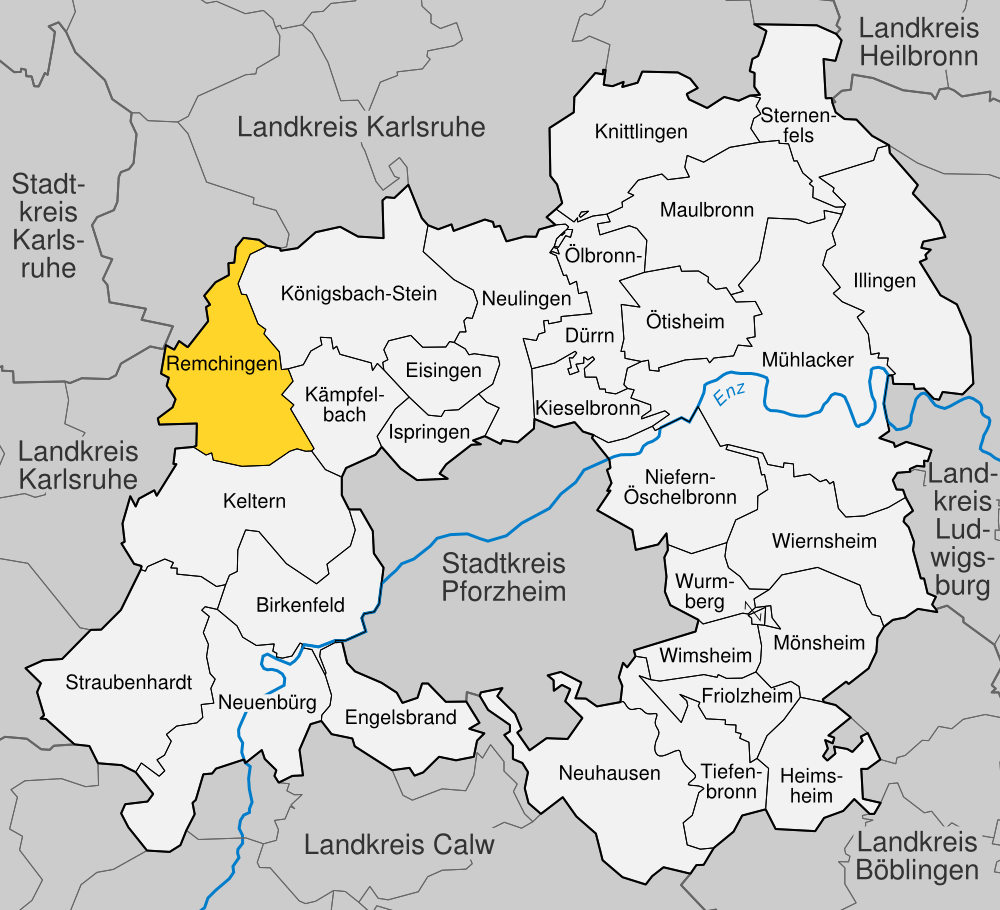
- Location of Remchingen within Enzkreis district
- Interactive map of Remchingen
- Location within Germany Location within Baden-Württemberg
- Coordinates: 48°57′0″N 8°34′35″E
- Country: Germany
- State: Baden-Württemberg
- Admin. region: Karlsruhe
- District: Enzkreis

Government
  - Mayor (2023–31): Julia Wieland

Area
  - Total: 24.06 km^{2} (9.29 sq mi)
- Elevation: 171 m (561 ft)

Population (2025-12-31)
  - Total: 11,757
  - Density: 488.7/km^{2} (1,266/sq mi)
- Time zone: UTC+01:00 (CET)
  - Summer (DST): UTC+02:00 (CEST)
- Postal codes: 75196
- Dialling codes: 07232
- Vehicle registration: PF
- Website: www.remchingen.de

Remchingen (German pronunciation: [ˈʁɛmçɪŋən]) is a municipality in the Enz district, in Baden-Württemberg, Germany, situated on the river Pfinz, 14 km southeast of Karlsruhe, and 12 km northwest of Pforzheim.

== History ==
=== Older history ===
- 1st millennium BC: Celtic settlement (grave finds 1947 in Singen)
- Roman settlement between 80 and 90 AD (numerous finds, including two pillars of denial from Nöttingen, two four-god stones immured in the churches of Nöttingen, inscription plate from the settlement Vicus Senotensis)
- After the Romans fled their flight around 260 AD, the Alamanni settled the land to the right of the Rhine, but a little over two centuries later, after a great battle in 496, they were forced by the Franconian tribe to give up the Kraichgau and the landscape up to vacate the Murg.
- The first written mentions of Remchingen districts date from the 8th century: On June 1, 769 in "Sigincheim im Pfinzgau" (first mention of Singen), four Franks gave Lorsch monastery a farmyard, 34 acres of arable land, a meadow and a piece of forest. Between 888 and 893, the abbot of this monastery exchanged further ownership of this monastery in "Vulvirincha", today's Wilferdingen, for the same area in Illingen, southeast of Maulbronn (Wilferdingen is mentioned for the first time).
- Around 825 a certain Noting, probably related to the Counts of Calw, gave the Reichenau monastery goods in Nöttingen, Dietenhausen and Singen, which at that time, like the entire northern Pfinztal, were in the Ufgau, according to a source from the 16th century.
- 1160: First mention of the Lords of Remchingen, a lower nobility family. They probably built a moated castle, Remchingen Castle, out of wood on the site of today's open-air swimming pool.
- 1278: Darmsbach is mentioned for the first time, a settlement that only developed in the High Middle Ages
- Shortly after 1300: The Lords of Remchingen sold their moated castle. They later bought back shares in the castle for a while, but then finally sold them to the Margraves of Baden in 1568.
- Around 1460, the pilgrimage chapel of our dear Frau zur Eich was built near today's Sperlingshof, but was abandoned again between 1520 and 1540. In 1568 rights to the former chapel were transferred from the Herrenalb monastery to the margraviate of Baden-Durlach. From the former buildings (chapel and outbuildings) only artefacts in the “monastery” are evidence of today. [8]
- 16th century: Nöttingen, Singen and Wilferdingen took part in the Bundschuh rebellion (1502) and the Peasants' War (1525)
- April 14, 1604: Margrave Ernst Friedrich von Baden died of a blow in a Calvinist-Lutheran religious war against Pforzheim near Remchingen Castle. The trigger for the dispute was the Staffort book of 1599 and the earlier relocation of the Baden residence to Durlach.

=== 19th and 20th centuries ===
- July 12, 1806: Foundation of the Grand Duchy of Baden
- 1861: Nöttingen successfully fought against the railway connection on the Karlsruhe – Mühlacker line, which then took place via Wilferdingen-Singen.
- March 21, 1919: Constitution of the Democratic Republic of Baden came into force
- June 25, 1939: Foundation of the Pforzheim district
- 1945: part of the American zone of occupation
- September 19, 1945: Foundation of the state of Württemberg-Baden
- April 25, 1952: Foundation of the state of Baden-Württemberg
- January 1, 1973 Foundation of the Enzkreis in accordance with the district reform in Baden-Württemberg

=== Reforms ===
The municipality of Remchingen was formed on January 1, 1973, through the merger of the two municipalities of Singen and Wilferdingen. The name of the former lords of "Remchingen" is chosen as the place name of the new community.

On January 1, 1975, the community of Nöttingen was incorporated into Remchingen.

No local councils have been set up, the districts are represented in different degrees in the local council.

=== Population development ===
Year	Population
1939	3.913
1959	5.096
1961	6.054
1970	7.650
1987	9.409
2000	11.407
2005	11.655
2008	11.846
2010	11.713
2013	11.698
2015	11.695
2016	11.943
2017	11.855
2018	11.773
2019	11.998
2020	12.055

=== Coat of arm ===
Two silver crossed glaive poles in red covered with a silver shield, inside a green-tipped red rose with blue clusters.

==== Old coats of arms ====
Before Remchingen came into being, there were the communities of Wilferdingen, Singen and Darmsbach, all of which had their own coat of arms. The coat of arms of Wilferdingen was then adopted.

Wilferdingen

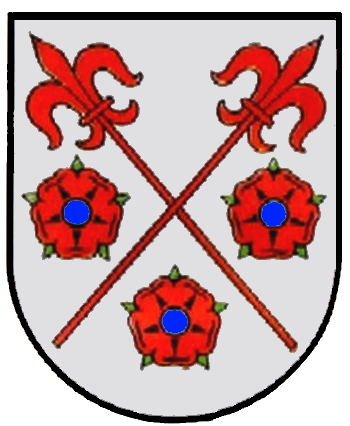
Singen

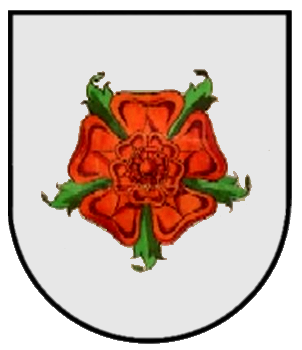
Nöttingen

== Geography ==
Remchingen consists of the former municipalities Nöttingen, Wilferdingen and Singen. Remchingen was originally formed on 1 January 1973 by the merging of the municipalities Wilferdingen and Singen with Nöttingen also being included on 1 January 1975.

Neighbouring municipalities are Pfinztal, Königsbach-Stein, Kämpfelbach, Keltern and Karlsbad.

The Pfinz River flows through Remchingen. The Auerbach, Stockwiesengraben, Rannbach and Seebach streams flow into the Pfinz in Remchingen. The small Stockmühlsee lake is located in Remchingen.

=== Climate ===
Remchingen has a relatively mild climate. This is characterized by the Pfinztal and the Rhine valley.

Climate data for Remchingen
Month	Jan	Feb	Mar	Apr	May	Jun	Jul	Aug	Sep	Oct	Nov	Dec	Year
Record high °C	17.9	19.3	23.7	26.7	30.6	34.6	36.9	35.1	31.5	28.1	21.9	18.4	36.9
Mean daily maximum °C	5.5	8.5	11.8	14.2	19.2	25.1	25.6	25.7	21.7	15.6	9.6	6.2	16.4
Daily mean °C	2.4	4.6	6.7	8.9	13.7	19.2	19.5	19.5	15.7	11.8	5.9	3.6	11.3
Mean daily minimum °C	−0.4	1.0	1.8	3.8	8.0	12.3	13.4	13.0	10.6	7.3	2.7	0.9	6.8
Record low °C	−10.4	−17.5	−4.8	−3.4	−1.6	4.2	5.8	5.3	2.8	−0.5	−6.4	−12.8	−17.5
Average precipitation mm	66	56	56	67	66	76	96	63	72	69	62	61	760
Average snowfall mm	39.4	25.7	16.1	2.6	0.4	0.0	0.0	0.0	0.0	0.1	12.3	45.2	141.8
Record high °F	64.2	66.7	74.7	80.1	87.1	94.3	98.4	95.2	88.7	82.6	71.4	65.1	98.4
Mean daily maximum °F	41.9	47.3	53.2	57.6	66.6	77.2	78.1	78.3	71.1	60.1	49.3	43.2	61.5
Daily mean °F	36.3	40.3	44.1	48.0	56.7	66.6	67.1	67.1	60.3	53.2	42.6	38.5	52.3
Mean daily minimum °F	31.3	33.8	35.2	38.8	46.4	54.1	56.1	55.4	51.1	45.1	36.9	33.6	44.2
Record low °F	13.3	0.5	23.4	25.9	29.1	39.6	42.4	41.5	37.0	31.1	20.5	9.0	0.5
Average precipitation inches	2.6	2.2	2.2	2.6	2.6	3.0	3.8	2.5	2.8	2.7	2.4	2.4	29.9
Average snowfall inches	1.55	1.01	0.63	0.10	0.02	0.0	0.0	0.0	0.0	0.00	0.48	1.78	5.58
Average precipitation days	18	14	13	14	12	14	14	13	14	16	17	18	177

== Sister cities, twin towns and friendship agreements ==
Remchingen has sister city agreements with the following cities:

- San Biagio Platani in Italy
- Sisak, Croatia.

Approximately 300 Sanbiagesi along with their families now live in Remchingen as well as another 100 former residents of Remchingen can be found in San Biagio Platani having returned to their hometown.

== Structure ==
Districts of Remchingen Wilferdingen Singen Nöttingen Darmsbach

Remchingen is made up of four districts which are very dense and central. The largest district is Wilferdingen. It is located in the middle of Remchingen. This is where most of the infrastructure and the town center can be found. Singen is on the northern side in the direction of Karlsruhe. Singen is the second largest district and is right next to Wilferdingen. Nöttingen is the third largest and southernmost district. Darmsbach, by far the smallest district of Remchingen, lies between Nöttingen and Wilferdingen. All four districts are very close to each other and can be reached very quickly.

=== Population distribution ===
- Wilferdingen (5218 inhabitants)
- Singen (3807 inhabitants)
- Nöttingen (2434 inhabitants)
- Darmsbach (558 inhabitants)

== Districts ==
The four districts are Wilferdingen, Singen, Nöttingen and Darmsbach.

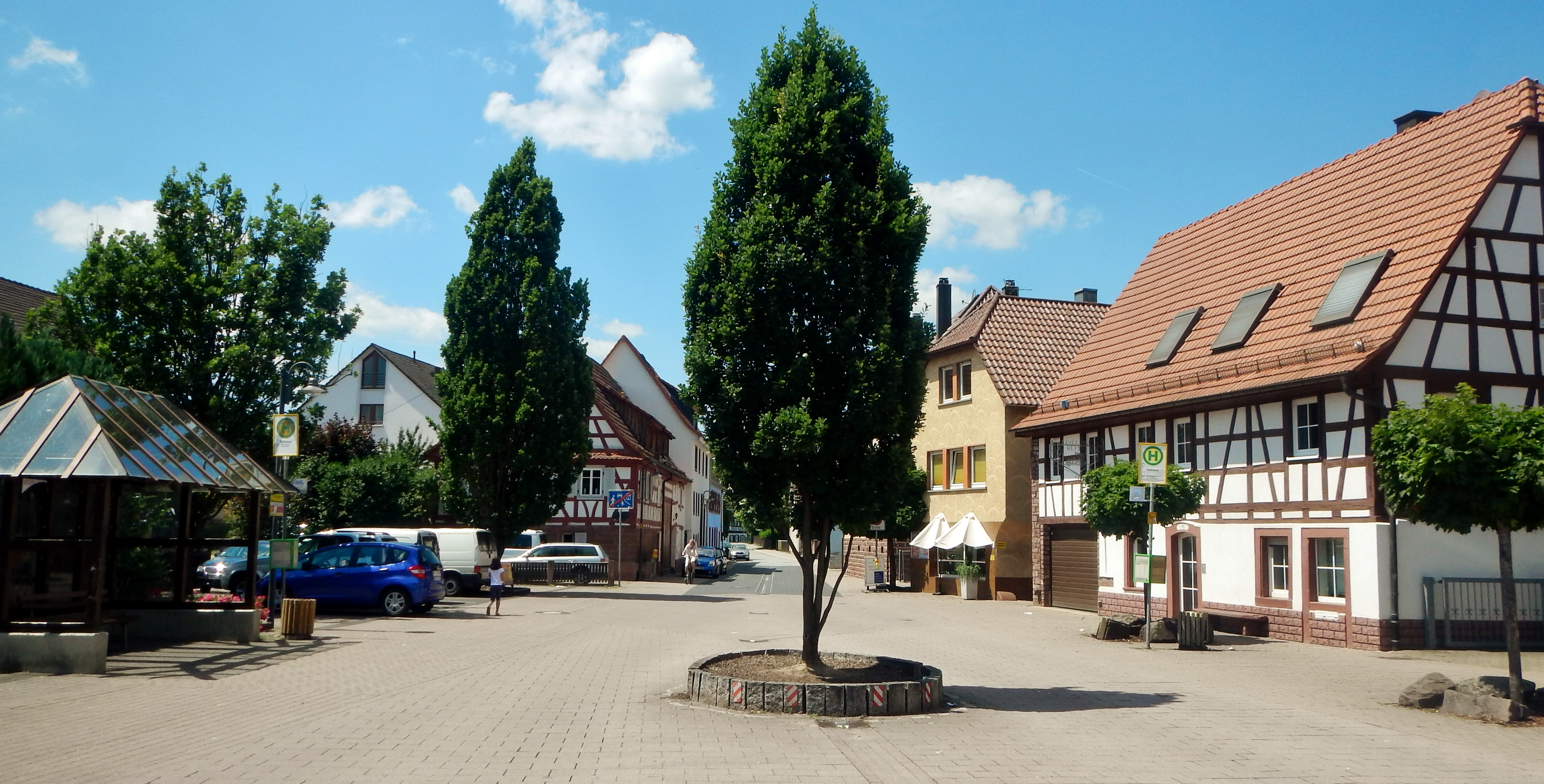
The Wettplatz, a public place, in Wilferdingen

=== Wilferdingen ===
Wilferdingen is the largest district in the municipality of Remchingen.

Wilferdingen used to be inhabited by Romans. An old Roman house was excavated on the Niemandsberg in Wilferdingen. Wilferdingen was an independent municipality until 1973. On January 1, 1973, Wilferdingen joined forces with Singen to form the Remchingen community.

Wilferdingen is in the center of Remchingen and is separated from Singen and Darmsbach. Darmsbach delimits the district on the southwestern tip. The northern border of Wilferdingen converges at the border of Singen. The river Pfinz, which is a tributary of the Rhine, runs through Wilferdingen.

The federal highway 10 runs through Wilferdingen and continues to Karlsruhe and Pforzheim. The Karlsruhe-Mühlacker railway runs on the border between Wilferdingen and Singen. There is the Wilferdingen-Singen train station in Wilferdingen, connected to Wilferdingen and Singen with the help of an underpass. From the train station you can get to Karlsruhe, Pforzheim and Stuttgart, among others. Light rail vehicles, the Interregio-Express and the Regional-Express stop here. There is also a small airfield in Wilferdingen.

There are several sports grounds, sports halls and athletics fields in Wilferdingen. Wilferdingen has, among a football club, an athletics club and many more. There is a wide range of sports on offer in Wilferdingen, from hockey to boules.

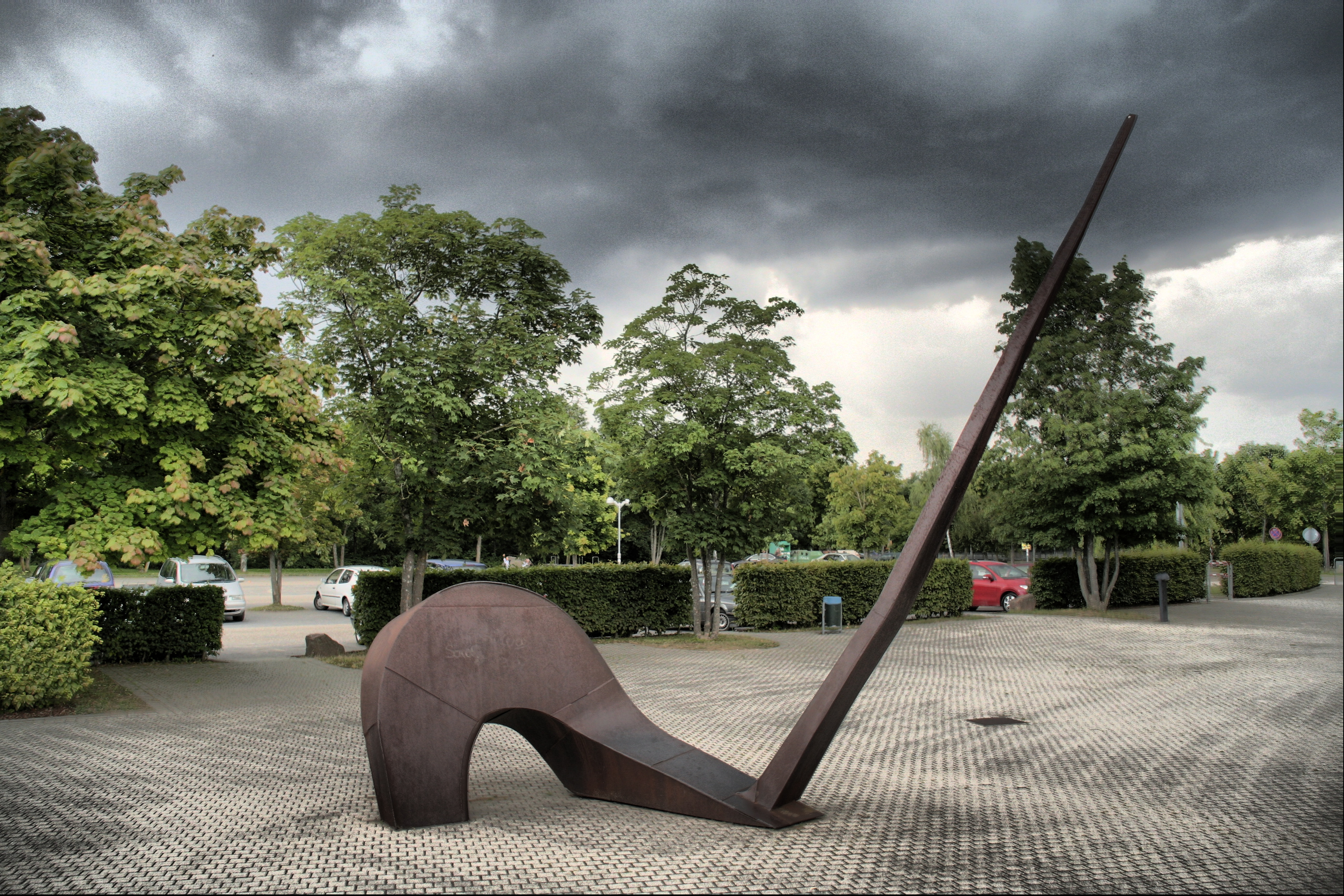
A statue in Wilferdingen at the Kulturhalle

Remchingen's central infrastructure is in Wilferdingen. So you can find the new Remchingen city centre there. In the city centre there are cultural offers such as the Remchingen cultural hall, the new town hall, a brewery and much more. You can also find the shopping street in Remchingen there. There are many shops along the B10. There are also many supermarkets, a hardware store, gas stations and also a primary and secondary school. Wilferdingen is the Remching district that has the most modern infrastructure. There are also some industrial parks, a police station, a fire station and a stationed ambulance in Wilferdingen.

=== Singen ===
Singen is the second largest district in the municipality of Remchingen.

Singen is the northernmost district of Remchingen, its settlement area lies predominantly on the right side of the Pfinz, which runs north-north-west there and which flows into the Kämpfelbach in the local area from the east. There is a weir and a watermill on the river. The district extends far to the south-west over the Pfinz and includes the large Buchwald forest and further north-north-east into the Hegenach forest.

Singen borders in the south on the settlement area of Wilferdingen, which is mostly on the other side of the Pfinztalbahn, which runs from the Kämpfelbachtal into the lower Pfinztal. The federal road 10 on the left Pfinzufer connects Singen with Pforzheim in the southeast and Karlsruhe in the northwest. The place is on the Bertha Benz Memorial Route.

Singen borders on the communities Pfinztal in the northwest, Königsbach-Stein in the east, Nöttingen and Karlsbad in the southwest.

Singen merged with Wilferdingen on January 1, 1973, to form the community of Remchingen. On this day, the Enzkreis was also created in its current form.

There is a train station in Singen, which forms the border with Wilferdingen. The Wilferdingen-Singen train station connects Singen with Wilferdingen via an underpass. From the train station you can reach Karlsruhe, Pforzheim and Stuttgart, among others. Light rail vehicles, the Interregio-Express and the Regional-Express stop here.

In Singen there is a Werkrealschule, a primary school and a grammar school. There are also supermarkets and many retail stores. Wilferdingen, which has a significantly better infrastructure, can be reached quickly from Singen via two bridges and two underpasses.

In Singen there is a soccer field, several sports halls, an indoor swimming pool, a tennis court and other sports grounds. There are gymnastics clubs that offer many sports such as gymnastics or Zumba in Singen, so overall a wide range of sports.

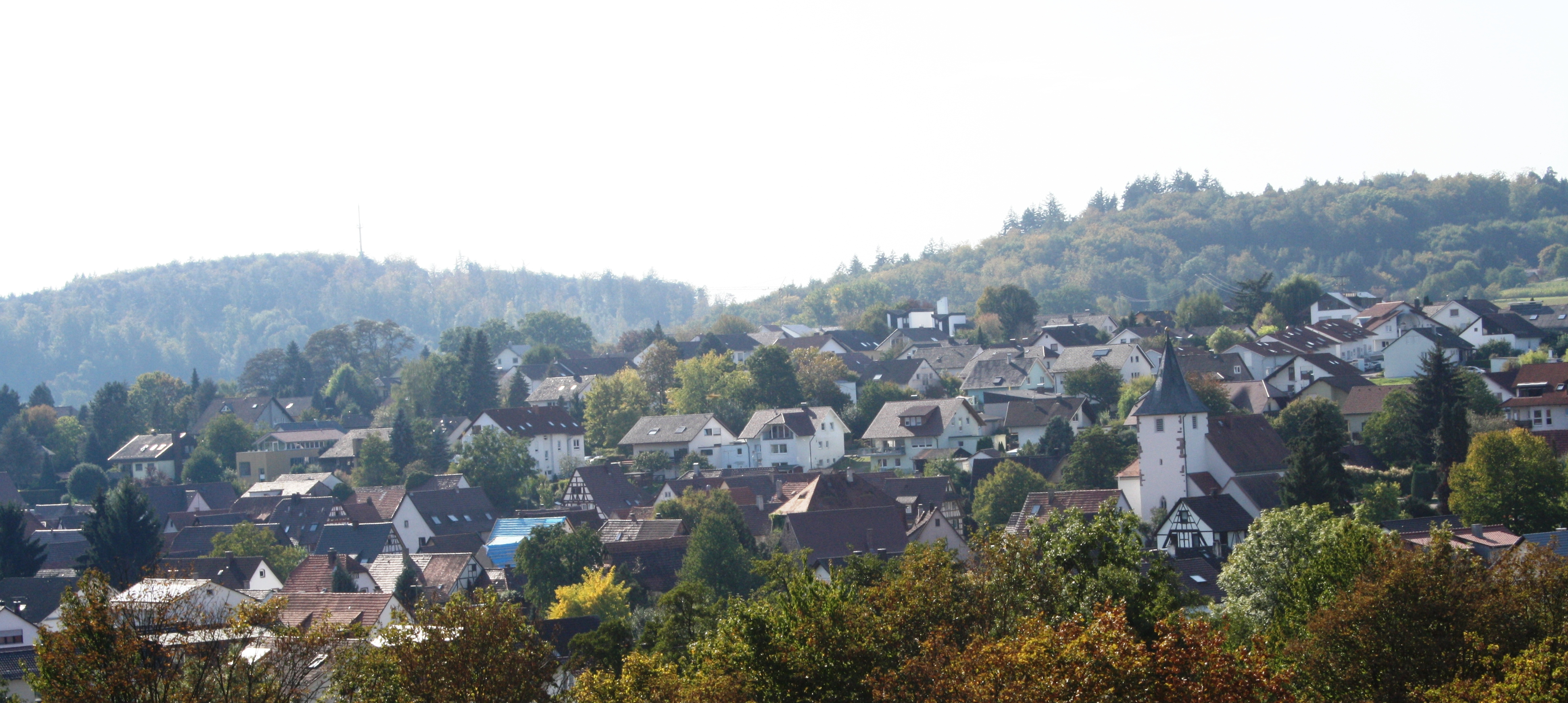
Photo from Nöttingen

=== Nöttingen ===
Nöttingen is a district of the southwest German municipality of Remchingenexactly between Pforzheim and Karlsruhe, which is why the place was an important transit point in history. The Church of St. Martin bears witness to this. Until the community reform, which came into force on January 1, 1975, Nöttingen was an independent community together with the smallest district of Darmsbach and the Dietenhäuser Mühle houses. Today 2500 people live in the place.

The local football club FC Nöttingen played in the then third-rate Regional League South in the 2004/05 season, after several years in the Baden-Württemberg Oberliga, Nöttingen returned to the Regional League, now the fourth division in the German league system, in the 2014/15 season, rose but immediately off again. In 2016/17 they entered the regional league again, followed by relegation. The venue is the Kleiner Arena.

The trampoline department of the Turnverein Nöttingen competes in the trampoline Bundesliga, the gymnastics department forms a gymnastics community with TB Wilferdingen in the Oberliga Baden-Württemberg.

=== Darmsbach ===
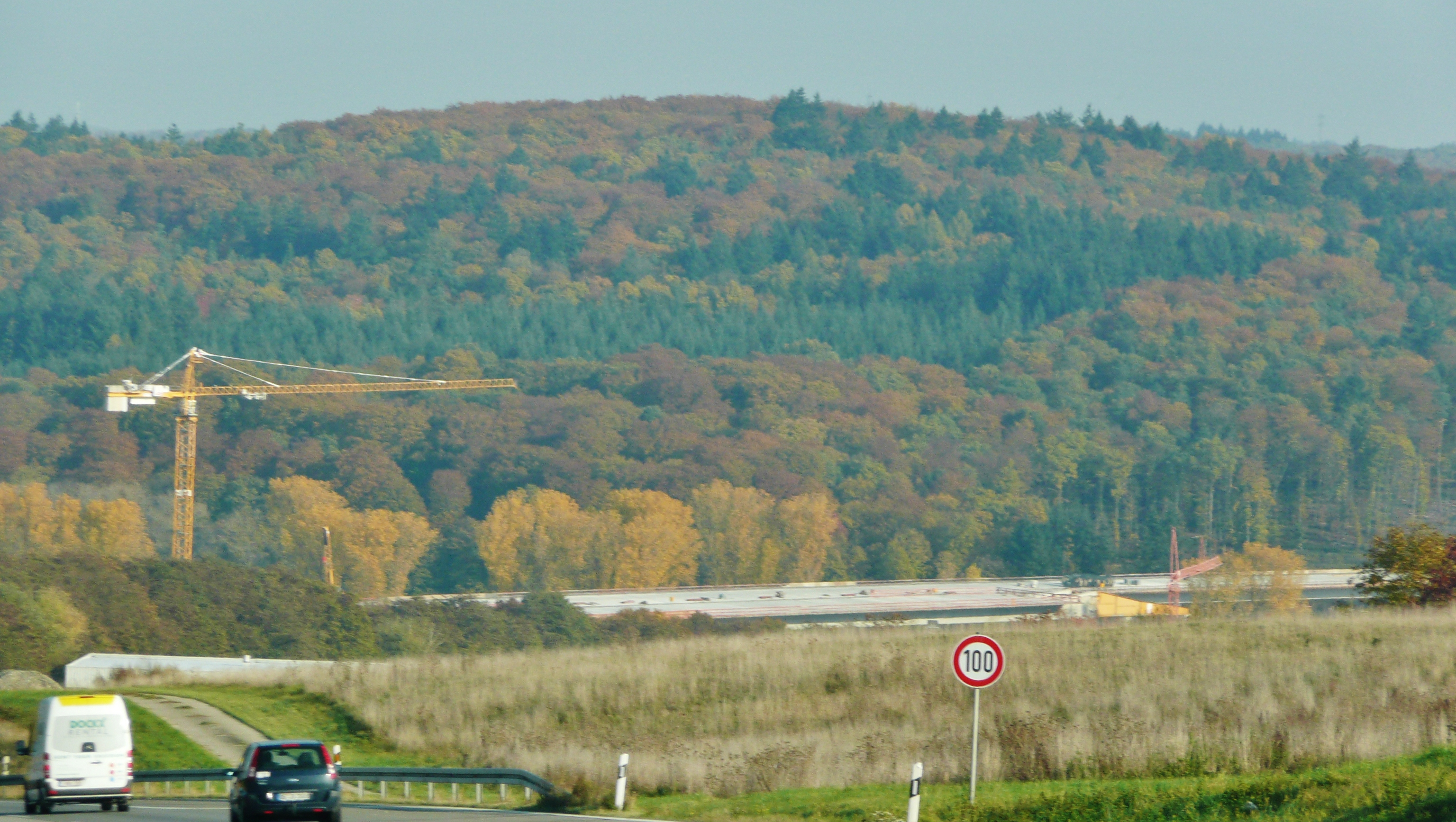
The Bundesautobahn 8 about Darmsbach

Darmsbach is the smallest district in the municipality of Remchingen.

Darmsbach is mentioned in 1278 as a settlement that only developed in the High Middle Ages. Darmsbach was part of the municipality of Nöttingen together with Nöttingen. Darmsbach is incorporated into Remchingen on January 1, 1975, with the municipality of Nöttingen.

Darmsbach is located directly between Wilferdingen and Nöttingen on the federal motorway 8. It is the most south-westerly point of Remchingen. Darmsbach is also on the border of the municipality of Karlsbad in the district of Karlsruhe.

Darmsbach has a town center, a day-care center and several playgrounds, football fields, etc. Due to its location, the town is well connected to Wilferdingen with bike paths, walking paths, field lanes, roads and buses. Wilferdingen, which offers the central infrastructure of Remchingen, can be reached within two minutes.

Darmsbach has had a football club, FC Baden Darmsbach, since the 2010s.

== Politics ==
=== Local council ===
The municipal council consists of 22 elected honorary councilors and the mayor as chairman. The mayor is entitled to vote in the municipal council.

The local elections was on May 29, 2019.

Party	Result	Seats	Results 2014
Christian Democratic Union of Germany	35,1 %	8	45,5 %, 10 Seats
Free Voters	19,7 %	4	24,9 %, 5 Seats
Alliance 90/The Greens	16,4 %	4	8,9 %, 2 Seats
Social Democratic Party of Germany	14,0 %	3	20,6 %, 5 Seats
Citizens list for the environment, transparency and progress	14,8 %	3	–

The turnout in 2019 was 63.4% (2014: 52.4%).

=== State election results ===
The results of the 2021 Baden-Württemberg state election in Remchingen.

Party	Votes	%
Alliance 90/The Greens (GRÜNE)	1.695	28.74
Christian Democratic Union of Germany (CDU)	1.271	21.55
Social Democratic Party of Germany (SPD)	555	9.41
Free Democratic Party (FDP)	786	13.33
Alternative for Germany (AfD)	747	12.67
The Left (LINKE)	167	2.83
Free Voters (FW)	138	2.34
Climate List Baden-Württemberg	44	0.75
Party WIR2020	113	1.92
Ecological Democratic Party	33	0.56
Volt Germany	26	0.44
Alliance C – Christians for Germany	322	5.46
Total	5.939	100.0
Invalid/blank votes	42	0.71
Registered voters/turnout	8.885	66.84

=== Mayor ===
In November 2009, Luca Wilhelm Prayon was elected the new mayor with 68.7 percent of the valid votes in the first ballot; he was re-elected in 2017 with 96% and a 34% turnout. In 2023, Julia Wieland won the election with 69.9 percent of all votes.

Result of the 2023 mayor election
Candidate	Result (in percent)
Julia Wieland	69.93
Gerd Kunzmann	21.33
Phillip Hildinger	7.19
Andreas Wagner	1.16

=== Parties ===
In Remchingen there are local groups of several parties:

- The Christian Democratic Union of Germany (CDU),
- Alliance 90/The Greens,
- the Social Democratic Party of Germany (SPD),
- the Free Voters,
- the local party Citizens List for Environment, Transparency and Progress,
- the Free Democratic Party (FDP),
- the Alternative for Germany (AfD) and
- the party Die PARTEI.

== Economy and infrastructure ==
=== Infrastructure ===
==== Railway ====
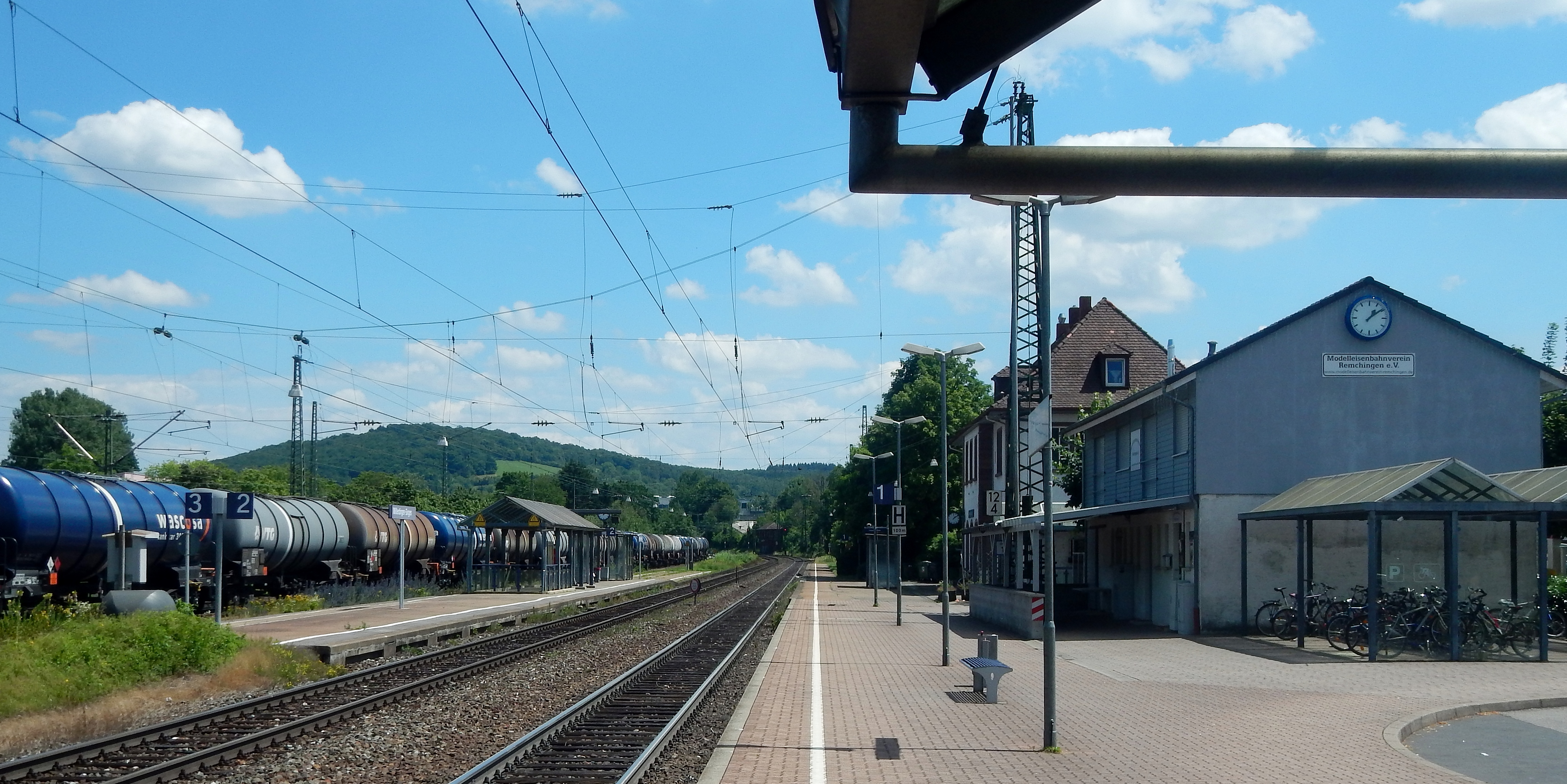
Train station in Remchingen

Remchingen is situated on the Karlsruhe-Mühlacker railway. The Wilferdingen-Singen station is the railway station in Remchingen. The Karlsruhe Stadtbahn drives to the station with the lines S5 and S51. It connects the station with Karlsruhe and Pforzheim. The trains come every 30 minutes. In addition, the IRE1 line stops in Remchingen every two hours. The regional train RB17a stops twice in the morning. It connects Remchingen with Karlsruhe, Heidelberg and Stuttgart.

==== Bus ====
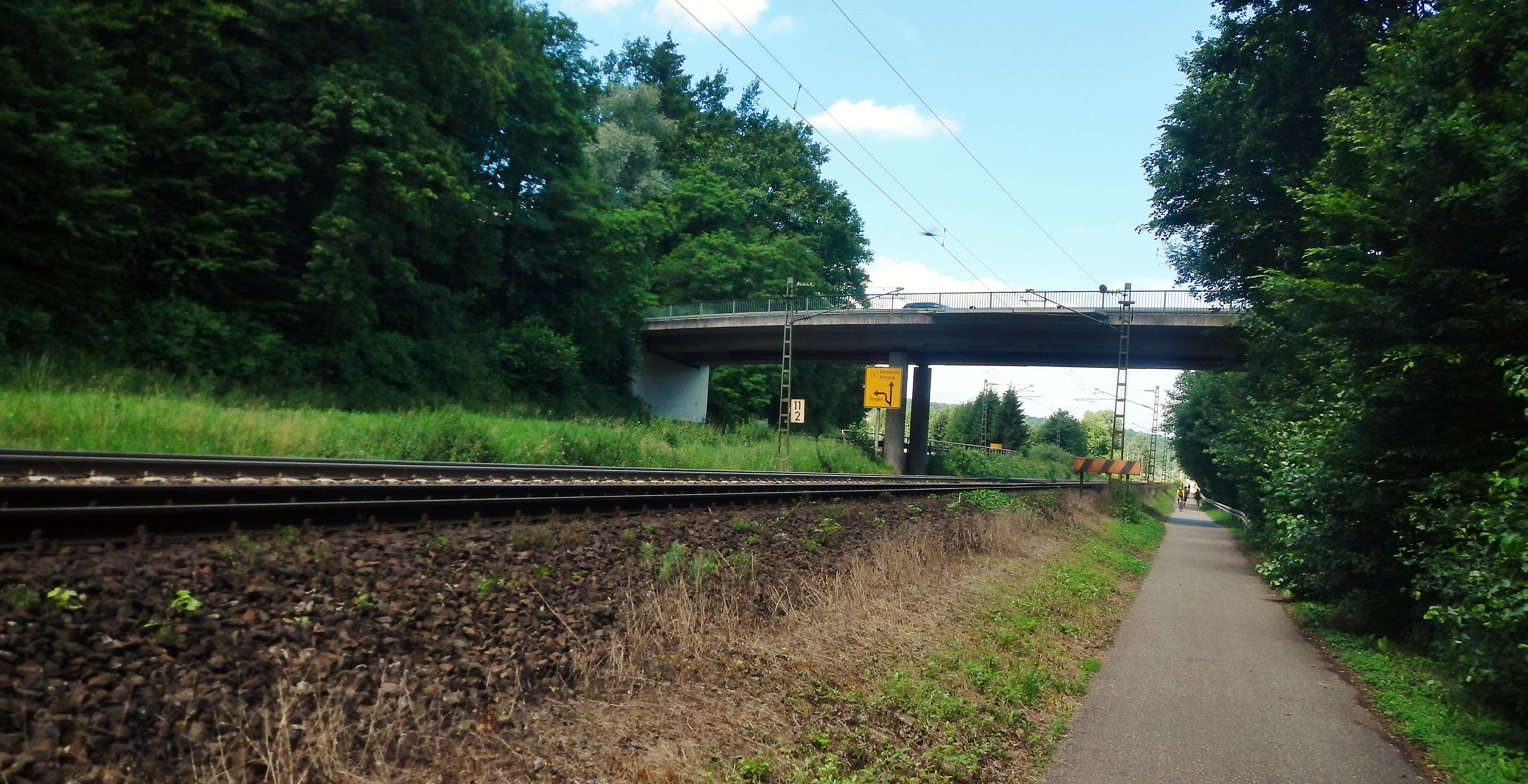
Stadtbahn in Remchingen

There are 22 bus stops in Remchingen. The central point is the bus station at the train station. Lines 722 and 721 connect Remchingen with Pforzheim. The lines 922 and 923 are driving in Remchingen too.

===== On-Demand Transportation =====
Remchingen also offers the bwshuttle, an on-demand transport service. It runs between 7:00 p.m. and 1:30 a.m. on weekdays and between 7:00 p.m. and 4:00 a.m. on weekends. It complements the public transportation system and can be booked via an app. There are over 100 stops in Remchingen. It is free with a Deutschlandticket or a KVV or VPE ticket.

==== Car ====
The Bundesstraße 10 and the Bundesautobahn 8 link the municipality to the national road network. The Pfinztal Bridge is a bridge in Remchingen-Nöttingen and part of the Bundesautobahn 8.

==== Cycling ====
Remchingen is connected to Karlsruhe and Pforzheim by an "everyday route" from the Baden-Württemberg cycle network.

The Stromberg-Murrtal Cycle Route is a long-distance state cycle route from Karlsruhe to Gaildorf and thus connects the EU Rhine Cycle Route with the Kocher-Jagst Cycle Route. It comes to Remchingen via Pfinztal and continues through both districts of Königsbach-Stein to Neulingen and Maulbronn.

=== Education ===
In Remchingen you can find a Realschule (Carl-Dittler-Realschule) in Wilferdingen. Further more there is a Gymnasium and an elementary school and a Hauptschule with Werkrealschule in Singen. There are other elementary schools in Wilferdingen and Nöttingen.

type of school	students
Elementary school	441
Werkreal-/Hauptschulen (secondary school)	189
Realschulen (secondary school)	369
Gymnasium (secondary school)	480
Special education	30
Total	1.509

== Culture and sights ==
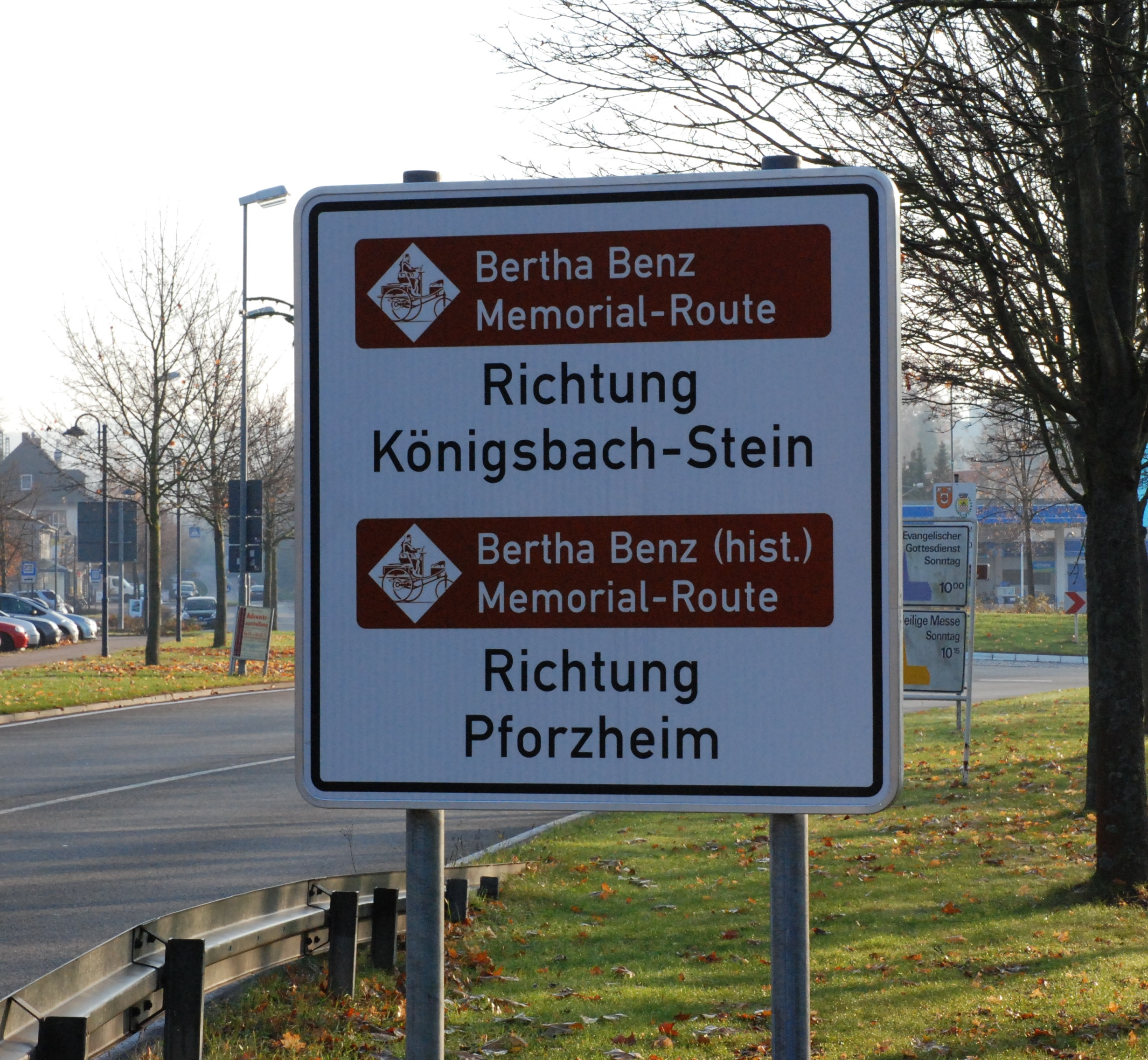
Sign for the Bertha Benz Memorial Route in Remchingen-Wilferdingen

Remchingen is located on Bertha Benz Memorial Route which leads from Mannheim to Pforzheim. Johann Gottfried Tulla, who got known for straightening the river Rhine, grew up in Nöttingen.

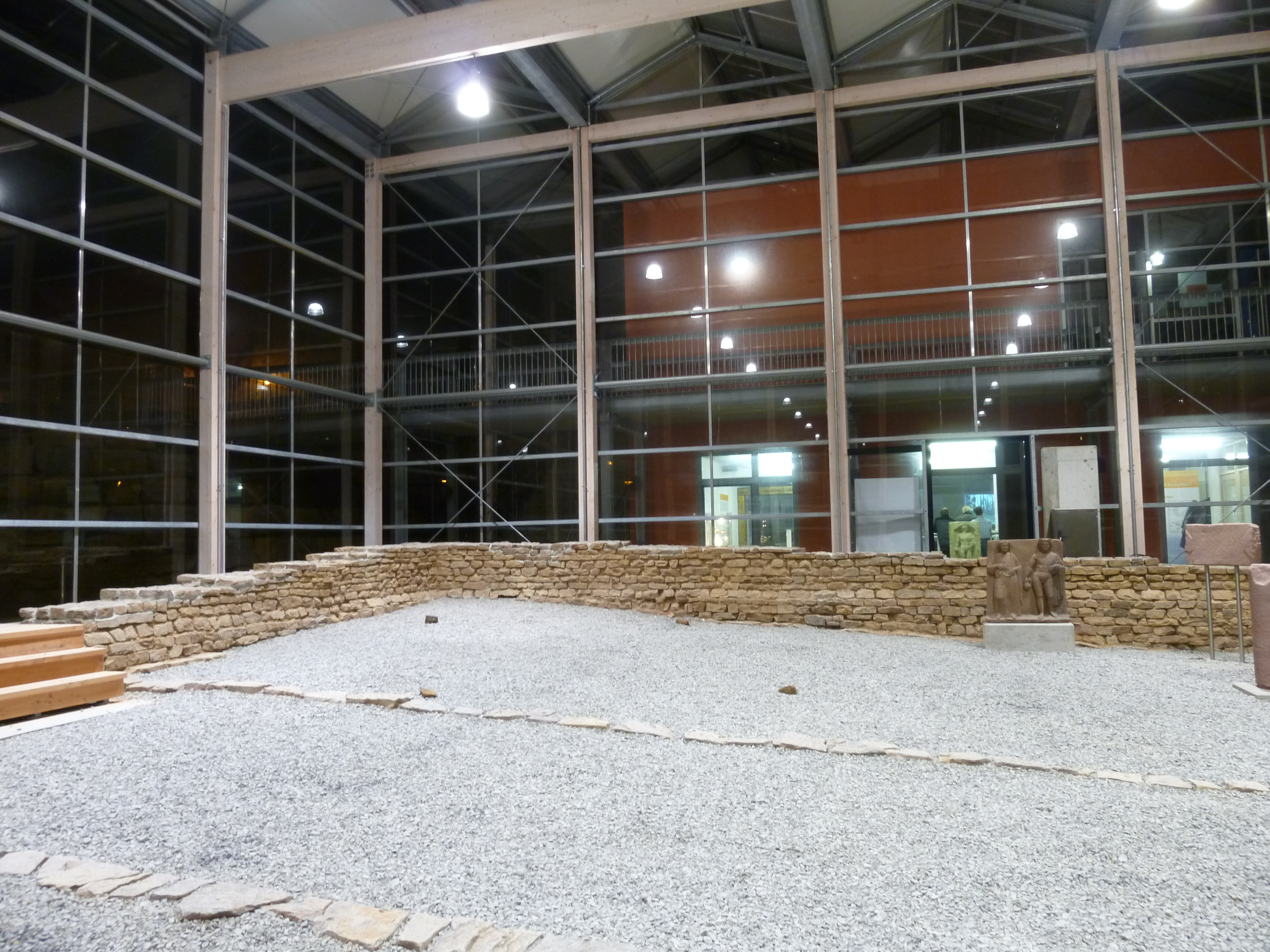
The Römermuseum Remchingen

=== Museums ===
The Roman Museum Remchingen (German: Römermuseum Remchingen) is in Remchingen-Wilferdingen. There is an old Roman house and many finds from Remchingen to see. The telephone booth museum (German: Telefonzellenmuseum) is on the railroad tracks. There are many telephones and telephone booths there.

=== Excavations ===
Discoveries of remains from the Roman Empire were made in and around the church of Nöttingen, which can partly be seen in the church and in a museum in Karlsruhe.

In the development area "Niemandsberg" in Wilferdingen an archeological excavation of a Roman farm can be found, which was turned into a museum.

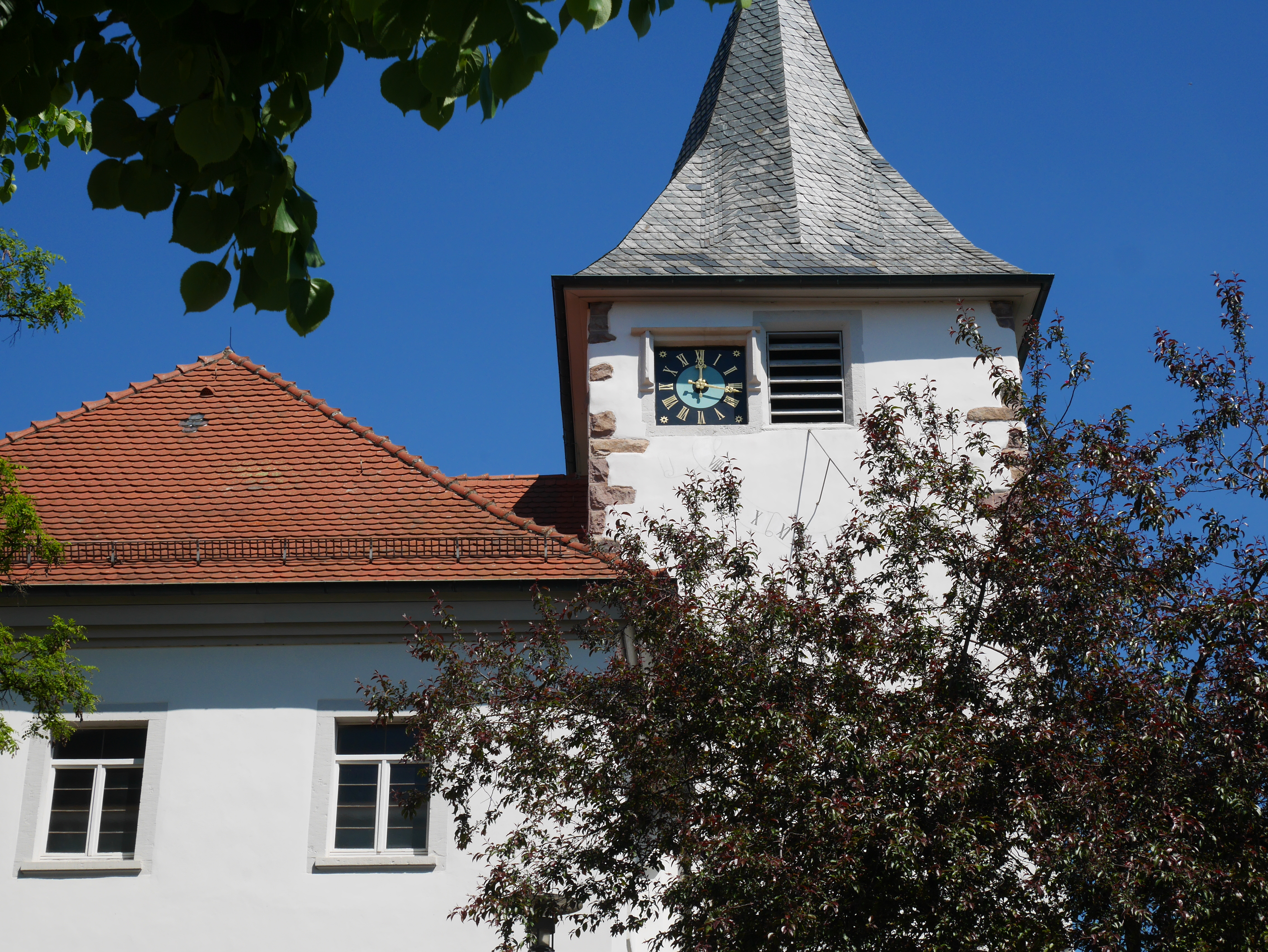
The Nöttingen St. Martin Süd

=== Churches ===
The Martinskirche in Nöttingen was first mentioned in a document in 1170. The church tower is built on the remains of a Roman watchtower, an indication that Nöttingen was already settled in Roman times. The St. Martin's patronage points to the preferred Frankish saint in the period from 7th to 9th centuries. Century (see St. Martin in the old town of Pforzheim). As here, the Martinskirchen were mostly built on the site of Gallo-Roman sanctuaries or on the foundations of secular buildings. In 1609 the church was redesigned and enlarged and in 1785 it was expanded again. When the church was repaired in 1936, the choir in particular was renovated and redesigned. The corner cubes that are now exposed again and the contrasting color of the window frames, like the sundial, were restored in 2006 based on the historical model. The Nöttinger Church is the oldest church in the area.

There are seven other churches in Remchingen like the Old Protestant Church of Wilferdingen.

=== Concerts, theatre and conventions ===
The Kulturhalle Remchingen is the central location for cultural events in Remchingen. It is an concert hall and event and conference center. There are multiple events:

- Theatre, concerts, cabaret and readings
- Festivals such as the No Playback Festival
- Events of local clubs
- Corporate events, trade fairs, and conferences (Like wedding or Tattoo conventions)
- Cultural events such as the municipality’s multi-part theater subscription
- Special events like the Remchinger Bierkultur, poetry slams, or children’s events

Additionally, there is the Löwensaal (a smaller concert hall) in the Remchingen district of Nöttingen.

Artists such as Motörhead guitarist Phil Campbell, Max Giesinger, Culcha Candela, Glasperlenspiel and much more have performed at the Kulturhalle.

== Sports ==
The football club FC Nöttingen played in the Fußball-Regionalliga in 2004, which was the third highest football league in Germany at that time. Currently they are playing in the Fußball-Oberliga Baden-Württemberg. The venue of the FC Nöttingen is the Kleiner Arena.

Other clubs in Remchingen are FC Germania Singen and FC Alemannia Wilferdingen.

The women's basketball department of FC Nöttingen plays under the name Rutronik Stars Keltern, formerly Grüner Stern Keltern, in the highest women's basketball league in Germany. The team is also playing in the EuroLeague Women. They have won the national championship.

The motorsport racing team Rutronik Racing is based in Remchingen.

== Notable people from Remchingen ==
- Johannes Reuchlin (1455–1522), philosopher and humanist; worked at the Maria zur Aych Monastery, today Sperlingshof
- Gottfried Leonhard (1895–1983), politician (CDU)
- Eva Rittmeister (1913–2004), German antifascist and paediatric nurse
- Johann Gottfried Tulla (1770–1828), engineer; known for straightening the Rhine; grew up in Remchingen-Nöttingen
- Max Giesinger (born 1988), singer, songwriter and music producer, grew up partially in Remchingen
- Simon Gegenheimer (born 1988), mountain biker and two-time vice world champion, was born in Remchingen and lives there
- Jeff S. Klotz (born 1990), Author, publisher, museum director and entrepreneur
- Jochen Reiser Professor, Doctor (born 1971), Physician-Scientist-Executive, Biotech-Founder, Member of German National Academy (Leopoldina)
