= Darmsbach =

- Ortsteil of Remchingen
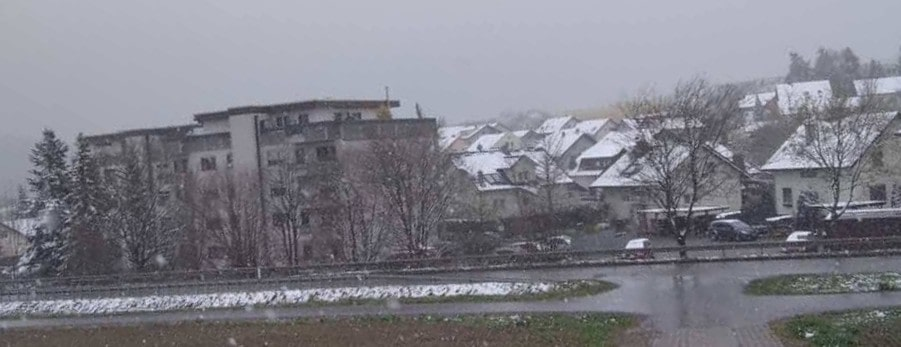

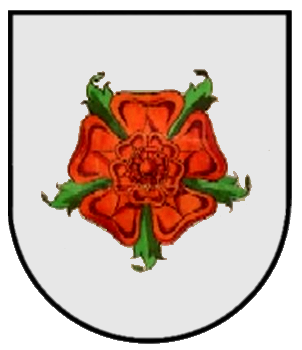
- Coat of arms
- Interactive map of Darmsbach
- Location within Germany Location within Baden-Württemberg
- Coordinates: 48°56′14.09″N 8°33′48.04″E
- Country: Germany
- State: Baden-Württemberg
- District: Enzkreis
- Municipality: Remchingen
- Elevation: 167 m (548 ft)

Population (2022)
  - Total: 591
- Time zone: UTC+01:00 (CET)
  - Summer (DST): UTC+02:00 (CEST)
- Postal codes: 75196
- Dialling codes: 07232
- Vehicle registration: PF
- Website: remchingen.de/wilferdingen

Darmsbach is the smallest district of the municipality of Remchingen in Baden-Württemberg, Germany.

== Geography ==
Darmsbach is located directly between Wilferdingen and Nöttingen on the Bundesautobahn 8. It is the most southwestern point of Remchingen. Furthermore, Darmsbach is located on the border of the municipality of Karlsbad in the district of Karlsruhe.

== History ==
In 1278 Darmsbach is mentioned as an extension settlement that was only established in the High Middle Ages. Darmsbach was a district of the municipality of Nöttingen, which was incorporated into Remchingen on January 1, 1975.

== Infrastructure ==
Darmsbach has a village center, a day care center and several playgrounds, ball fields, etc. Due to its location, the village is well connected to Wilferdingen with bicycle paths, walking trails, field paths, roads and buses. One can reach Wilferdingen, which offers the central infrastructure of Remchingen, within two minutes. Darmsbach has a soccer club, FC Baden Darmsbach, since the 2010s.
