= Rannbach (Pfinz) =

River in Baden-Württemberg, Germany

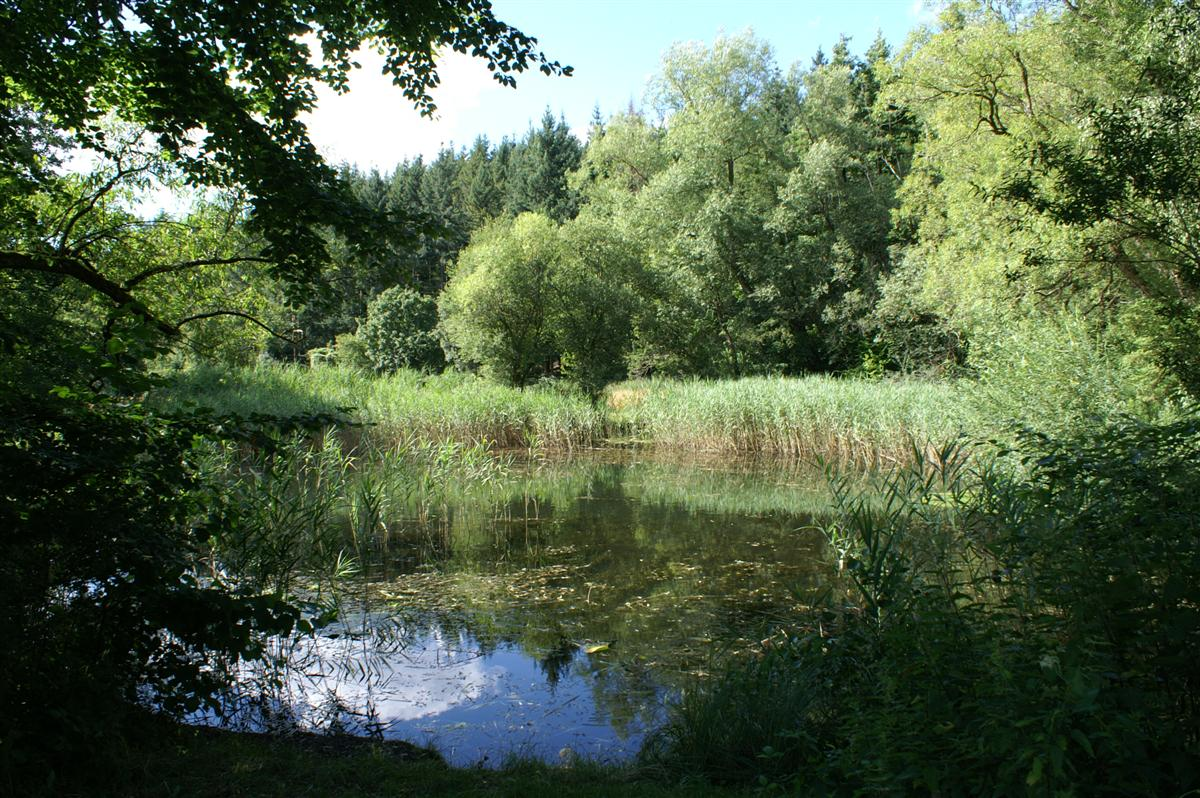
- The Rannbach flowing through the Ranntal near Dietlingen

Location
- Country: Germany
- State: Baden-Württemberg
- District: Enzkreis

Physical characteristics
- Source: Rannwald forest near Dietlingen (Keltern)
  - location: Keltern-Dietlingen
  - coordinates: 48.906752°N 8.609274°E
  - elevation: 252 m (827 ft)
- Mouth: Pfinz
  - location: Remchingen-Nöttingen
  - coordinates: 48.931235°N 8.572886°E
  - elevation: 162 m (531 ft)
- Length: 3.7 km (2.3 mi)
- Basin size: 8.2 km^{2} (3.2 sq mi)

Basin features
- Tributaries
  - left: Neue Neubrüch, other headstream
- River system: Rhine

The Rannbach is a small river of about 3.7 kilometres in length and a right tributary of the Pfinz in the district of Enzkreis in Baden-Württemberg, Germany. It flows mostly through forested terrain before joining the Pfinz in Remchingen-Nöttingen.

== Geography ==
=== Course ===
The Rannbach rises at an elevation of about 252 m (827 ft) in the Rannwald forest north of Dietlingen, part of the municipality of Keltern. The source lies within wooded terrain that belongs to the natural region of the Kraichgau.

A smaller source branch, known as the Einsiedlerbrunnen, originates at around 280 m (920 ft) within the same forest and joins the main stream after roughly 500 metres at about 248 m (814 ft) from the left.

The Rannbach flows northwest through the small valley known as the Ranntal, passing an artificial pond of roughly 0.2 a water surface at about 325 m (1,066 ft) elevation.

In the section called Untere Rann, a small stream called Neue Neubrüch joins from the left at around 197 m (646 ft). This tributary is approximately 800 m long and rises near the field area called Neue Neubrüch at about 210 m (690 ft).

After about 3.7 kilometres, the Rannbach reaches the Pfinz near Remchingen-Nöttingen at around 162 m (531 ft).

=== Basin ===
The basin area of the Rannbach covers approximately 8.2 km² and lies entirely within the municipalities of Keltern and Remchingen in the Enzkreis district. The upper section is mostly forested, while the lower course transitions into open farmland.

=== Tributaries ===
- Other headstream (left), about 0.5 km
- Neue Neubrüch (left), about 0.8 km
