= Singen (Remchingen) =

- Ortsteil of Remchingen
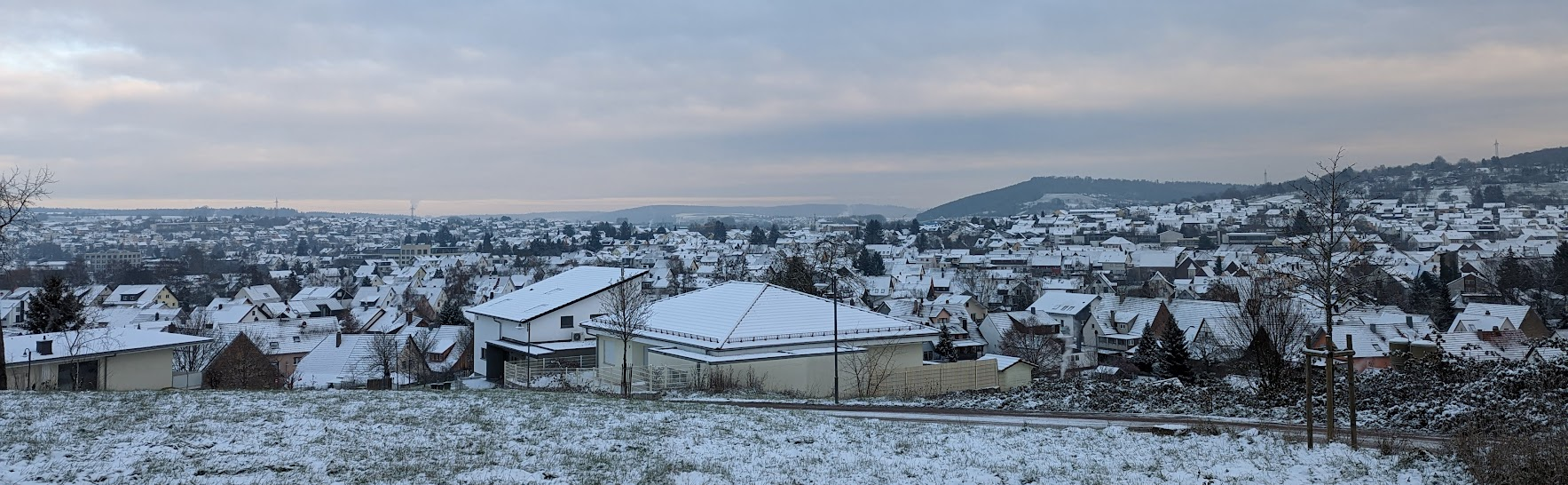

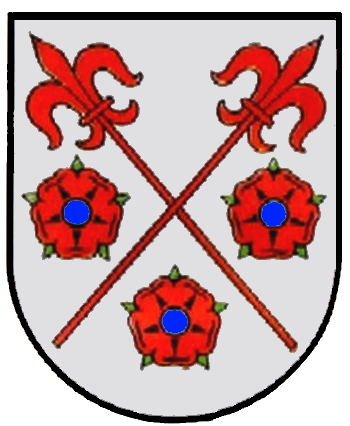
- Coat of arms
- Interactive map of Singen
- Location within Germany Location within Baden-Württemberg
- Coordinates: 48°57′27.18″N 8°34′4.48″E
- Country: Germany
- State: Baden-Württemberg
- District: Enzkreis
- Municipality: Remchingen

Area
  - Total: 7.04 km^{2} (2.72 sq mi)
- Elevation: 160 m (520 ft)

Population (2022)
  - Total: 3,746
  - Density: 532/km^{2} (1,380/sq mi)
- Time zone: UTC+01:00 (CET)
  - Summer (DST): UTC+02:00 (CEST)
- Postal codes: 75196
- Dialling codes: 07232
- Vehicle registration: PF
- Website: remchingen.de/singen

Singen (German pronunciation: [ˈzɪŋən]) is the second largest district of the municipality of Remchingen in the Enzkreis district in Baden-Württemberg, Germany.

== Geography ==
Singen is the northernmost district of Remchingen, its settlement area lies predominantly on the right side of the Pfinz running north-northwest there, which is joined by the Kämpfelbach from the east in the area of the village. There is a weir and a water mill on the river. The district's territory extends far to the southwest across the Pfinz and includes the large forest Buchwald and even further to the north-northeast into the forest Hegenach.

Singen borders in the south on the settlement area of Wilferdingen, which lies for the most part beyond the Pfinztal railroad, which runs from the Kämpfelbachtal into the lower Pfinztal. The Bundesstraße 10 on the left bank of the Pfin River connects Singen with Pforzheim in the southeast and Karlsruhe in the northwest. The town lies on the Bertha Benz Memorial Route.

Singen borders the communities of Pfinztal to the northwest, Königsbach-Stein to the east, Nöttingen and Karlsbad to the southwest.

== History ==
Singen has been settled since the 4th/3rd century BC. Archaeological finds prove Celtic settlement in the Singen area as early as 500 years before Roman times. In 1949, during construction work on Bergstraße in Singen, three Celtic graves dating from the 4th/3rd century BC were discovered on the outskirts of town.

The first written record of Singen dates back to 769 in the Codex of Lorsch Abbey. It mentions Ricger from "Sigincheim," who bequeathed land, a meadow, and a forest to the abbey.

In 1792, Margrave Karl Friedrich granted Singen permission to build its own school, which opened two years later, in 1794. Building materials from the demolished church in Remchingen were used in its construction. The schoolhouse was expanded in 1877, with the addition of a teacher's apartment and an extra classroom. As the number of students continued to rise, a new school building was erected in 1907. After the opening of the Bergschule in 1969, the old schoolhouse was repurposed. In 1972, the Singen town hall moved into the building. Today, the Remchingen town hall is located at San Biagio Square in Wilferdingen.

With the opening of the Residenzbahn railway in 1861, Singen transformed from an agricultural village into a working-class residential community. The railway connection enabled many residents to work in the surrounding cities, particularly Pforzheim and Karlsruhe. In 1888, Bertha Benz drove through the town in the motor vehicle developed by her husband, Carl Benz, on her journey to Pforzheim.

Further infrastructural development continued in the late 19th and early 20th centuries. In 1892, the Zweckverband zur Wasserversorgung der Gemeinden des Hügellandes zwischen Alb und Pfinz (Association for the Water Supply of the Communities of the Hill Country between the Alb and Pfinz Rivers) was founded, and the first water pumping station was built next to the Singen Mill. Singen became part of the telephone network in 1909, and in 1919, the town was connected to the electricity grid. The volunteer fire department was founded in 1928, and in 1934, the bypass was completed to relieve traffic congestion on Marktstraße (Market Street).

Significant expansion of public infrastructure took place from the 1960s onward: The Bergschule (Mining School) was founded in May 1969, followed in 1971 by the indoor swimming pool and the adjoining gymnasium, which was also available to local clubs and associations. On January 1, 1973, Singen merged with Wilferdingen to form Remchingen.

Singen merged with Wilferdingen on January 1, 1973, to form the municipality of Remchingen. The Enzkreis in its current form also came into being on this day.

== Transportation ==
The railroad station of Singen forms the local border to Wilferdingen. The station Wilferdingen-Singen connects Singen with Wilferdingen through an underpass. From the station you can reach Karlsruhe, Pforzheim and Stuttgart, among others. Light rail trains, the Interregio-Express and the Regional-Express stop here.

== Education ==
In Singen there is a Werkrealschule, an elementary school and a high school.

== Demographics ==
=== Population Development ===
- 1871: 627 inhabitants
- 1950: 1,512 inhabitants
- 1970: 2,485 inhabitants
- 2019: 3,793 inhabitants
