= Kulturhalle Remchingen =

Music venue, event and conference center in Remchingen, Germany

Culture Hall Remchingen
- Kulturhalle Remchingen
- Interactive map of Culture Hall Remchingen
- Address: Hauptstraße 115, DE-75196 Remchingen; Remchingen; Germany
- Location: Remchingen-Wilferdingen, Enz district
- Coordinates: 48.952762°N 8.570248°E
- Owner: Municipality of Remchingen
- Operator: Municipality of Remchingen
- Capacity: Up to 600 seated or 1000 standing (main hall)
- Type: Event and conference center
- Public transit: Wilferdingen-Singen station, 200 meters IRE 1 RB 17a S 5 S 51

Construction
- Groundbreaking: 1989
- Built: 1989–1990
- Opened: 1990
- Architect: Helmut Striffler

Website
- kulturhalle-remchingen.de

Kulturhalle Remchingen is a concert hall, event and conference center in Remchingen, located in the Enz district of Baden-Württemberg, Germany. Opened in 1990, the hall is a cultural hub for the region between Karlsruhe and Pforzheim.

Artists such as Motörhead guitarist Phil Campbell, Max Giesinger, Culcha Candela, Glasperlenspiel and much more have performed at the Kulturhalle.

== History ==
The Kulturhalle was constructed between 1989 and 1990 following plans by architect Helmut Striffler. It was designed as a modern, multifunctional hall to consolidate and expand the cultural offerings of the municipality.

== Location ==
The Kulturhalle is situated in Remchingen-Wilferdingen along the federal road Bundesstraße 10. The Wilferdingen-Singen railway station is located directly opposite. There are underground parking facilities and parking spaces available for both cars and bicycles.

== Architecture and Facilities ==
The hall features modern architecture with large glass surfaces and an open foyer. The available spaces include:

- Large hall (approx. 530 m²), suitable for up to 600 people seated or 1000 standing
- Foyer/Lobby (approx. 340 m²) for exhibitions, refreshments during breaks, or smaller events
- Meeting room (approx. 100 m²)
- Ticket office
- Ballet school

Additionally, there is the Löwensaal (a smaller concert hall) in the Remchingen district of Nöttingen.

The technical equipment includes modern sound and lighting technology, stage technology, a mobile orchestra pit, a projector, flexible seating arrangements, and barrier-free access.

== Usage ==
The Kulturhalle serves as a venue for:

- Theatre, concerts, cabaret and readings
- Festivals such as the No Playback Festival
- Events of local clubs
- Corporate events, trade fairs, and conferences (Like wedding or Tattoo conventions)
- Cultural events such as the municipality’s multi-part theater subscription
- Special events like the Remchinger Bierkultur, poetry slams, or children’s events

Artists such as Phil Campbell, Max Giesinger, Culcha Candela, and Glasperlenspiel have performed at the Kulturhalle.

== Management and Organization ==
The Kulturhalle is operated by the municipality of Remchingen. The cultural office is headed by Jeannine Pfrommer.
