= Roman Museum Remchingen =

Coordinates: 48°56′25.08″N 8°34′13.8″E

- Römermuseum Remchingen
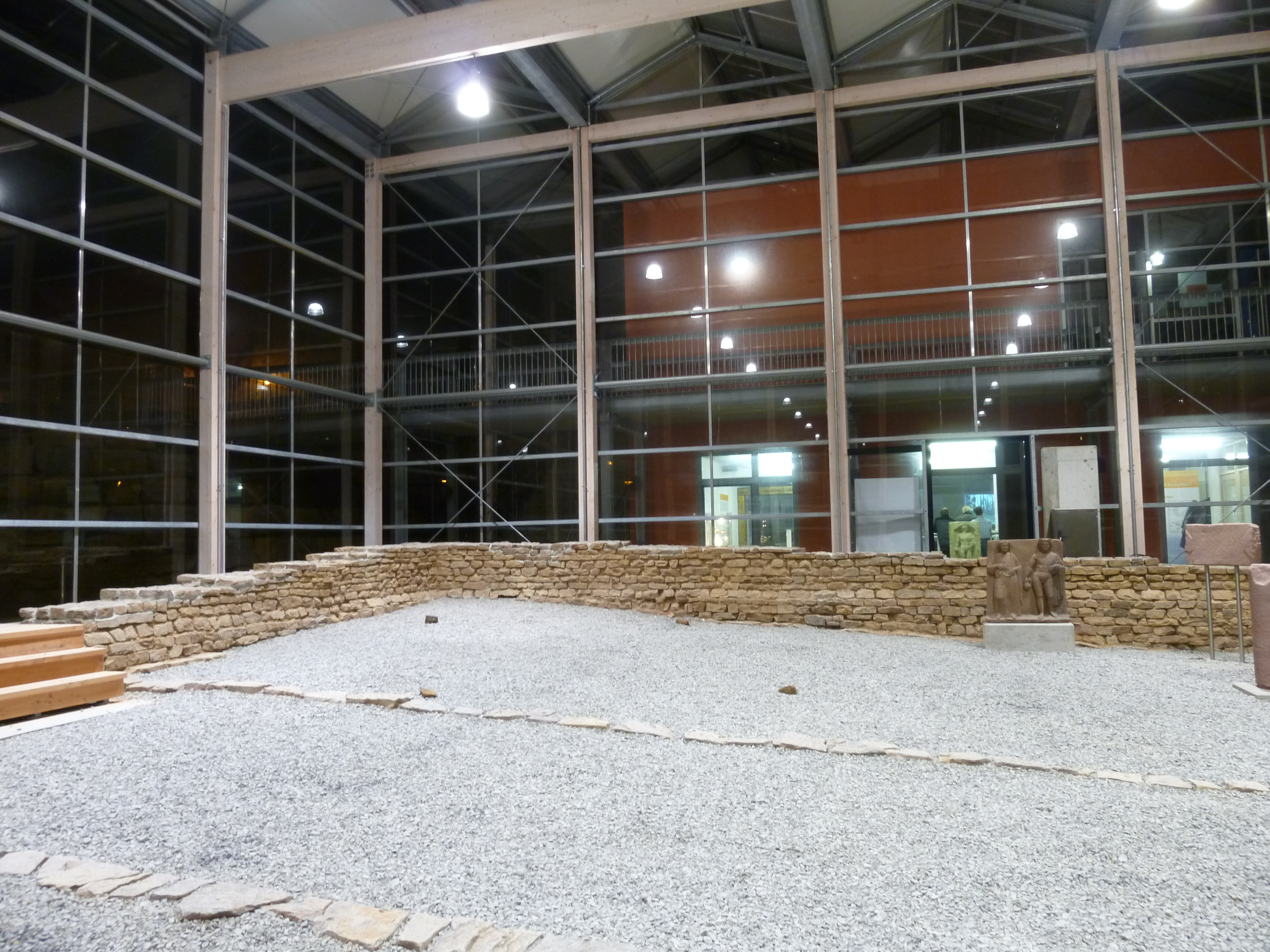

- Location within Germany
- Established: 2009
- Location: Remchingen, Germany
- Type: History museum
- Founder: Heimatverein Remchingen
- Directors: Jeff S. Klotz, Anna Panteleit, Monika Foemer
- Public transit access: IRE 1 RB 17a S 5 S 51 Wilferdingen-Singen station
- Parking: Roman Museum Remchingen parking
- Website: roemermuseum-remchingen.de

The Roman Museum Remchingen (German: Römermuseum Remchingen) is a Museum in Remchingen, Germany.

In the museum you can find, among other things, the walls of a Roman house.

== History ==
In 2007, when a house was being built in Remchingen, a Roman wall was uncovered, according to studies it was part of a Roman-era house. After that, more Roman things were found in the area. After the foundation walls had been completely exposed, the Roman Museum Remchingen project was launched. The museum was opened in 2009 under the leadership of Jeff Klotz.

In 2016, a floor and other Roman artifacts were found in the museum area. The floor was shown as part of a traveling exhibition in Berlin, among other places. A small park was created at the site where other finds, such as a piece of a Roman court floor, are presented.

== Exhibitions ==
- 2014: Look where you live (Schau mal, wo du lebst)
- 2016: Women on the move (Frauen im Aufbruch)
- 2018: Myth of Jerusalem (Mythos Jerusalem)
- 2021: Peregrinatio - The story of pilgrimage and pilgrimage (Peregrinatio – Die Geschichte des Pilgerns und der Wallfahrt)

== Museum offers ==
The museum is open on Sundays. Group tours are offered, also for school classes and other groups. The museum also has a museum cafe. There are various themed exhibitions.

== Management of the museum ==
The museum was founded by volunteers from the Heimatverein Remchingen. The museum is managed by Jeff Klotz, Anna Panteleit and Monika Foemer.

== History around the museum ==
The museum deals with the life of the Romans and Gauls in what is now Remchingen. In the first century, the Romans relocated Gauls to the southwest, where there were only few places. This is how this settlement was laid out in Remchingen.

== List of finds in Remchingen ==
1. Roman estate in Remchingen-Wilferdingen
2. Roman road in the city forest of Remchingen
3. Roman house in the Remchingen district of Wilferdingen
4. Antiques like a vase or screws all over Remchingen

== Gallery ==
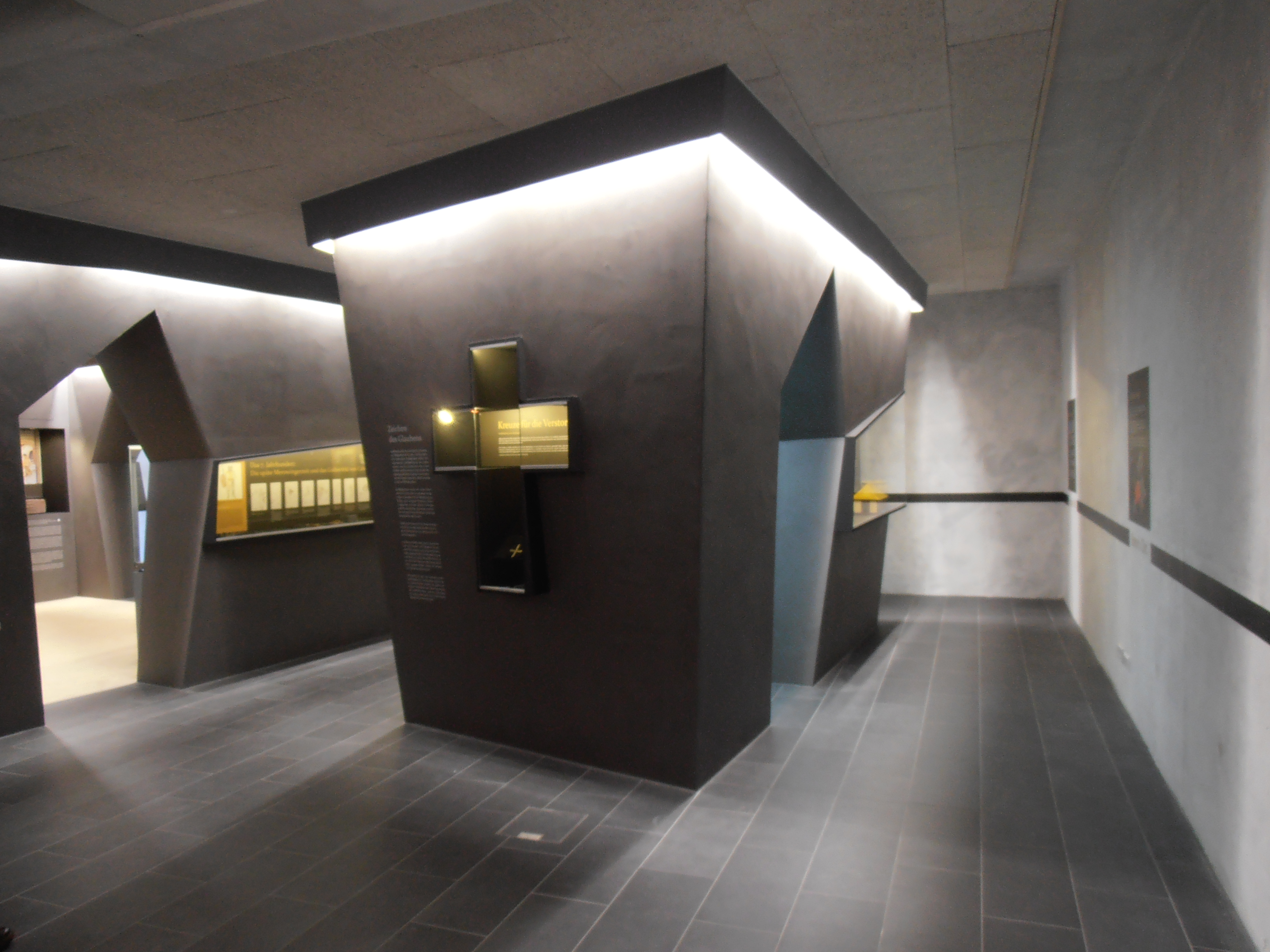
Römermuseum Remchingen interior

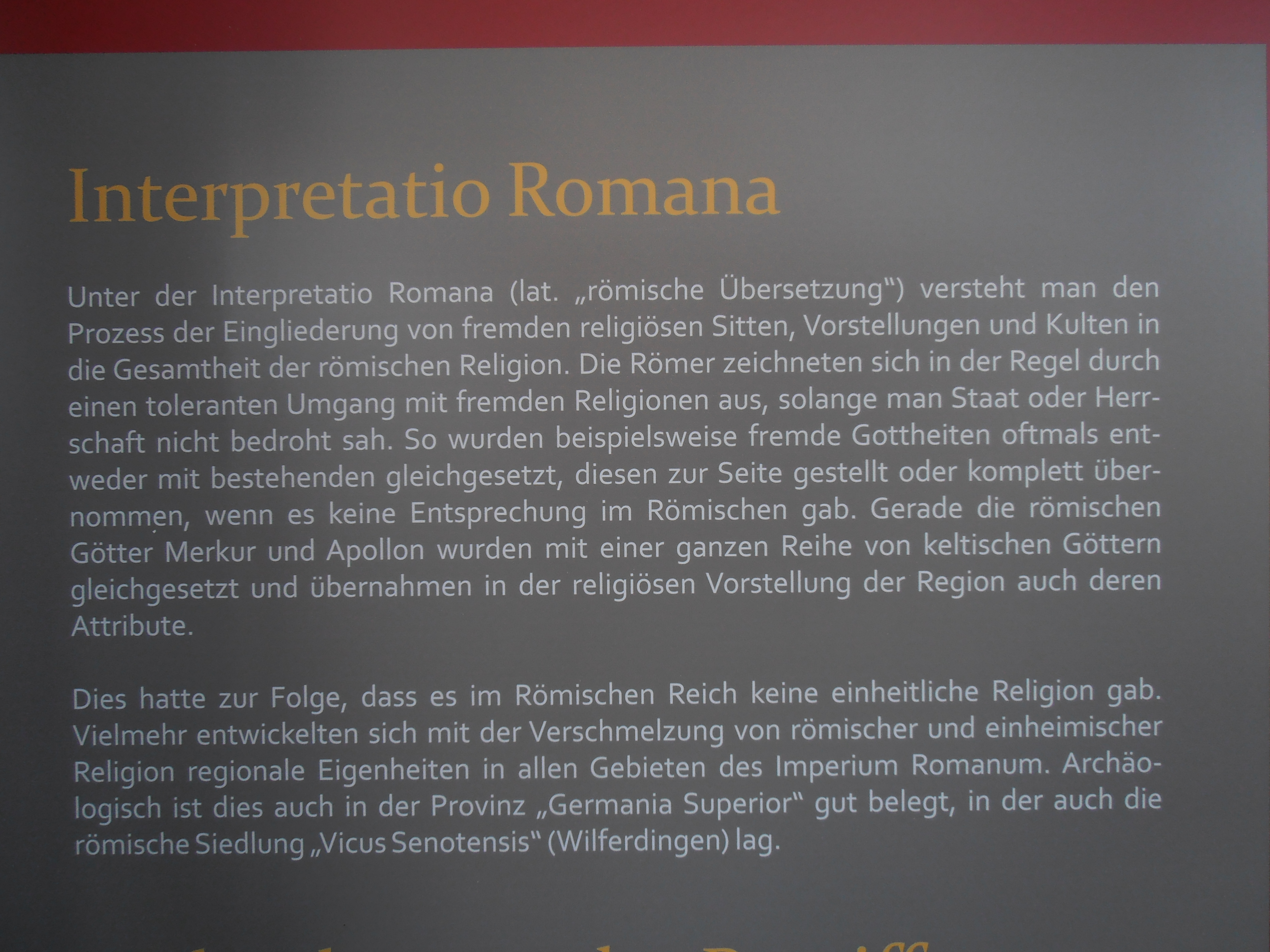
Interpretatio Roman, Infosign

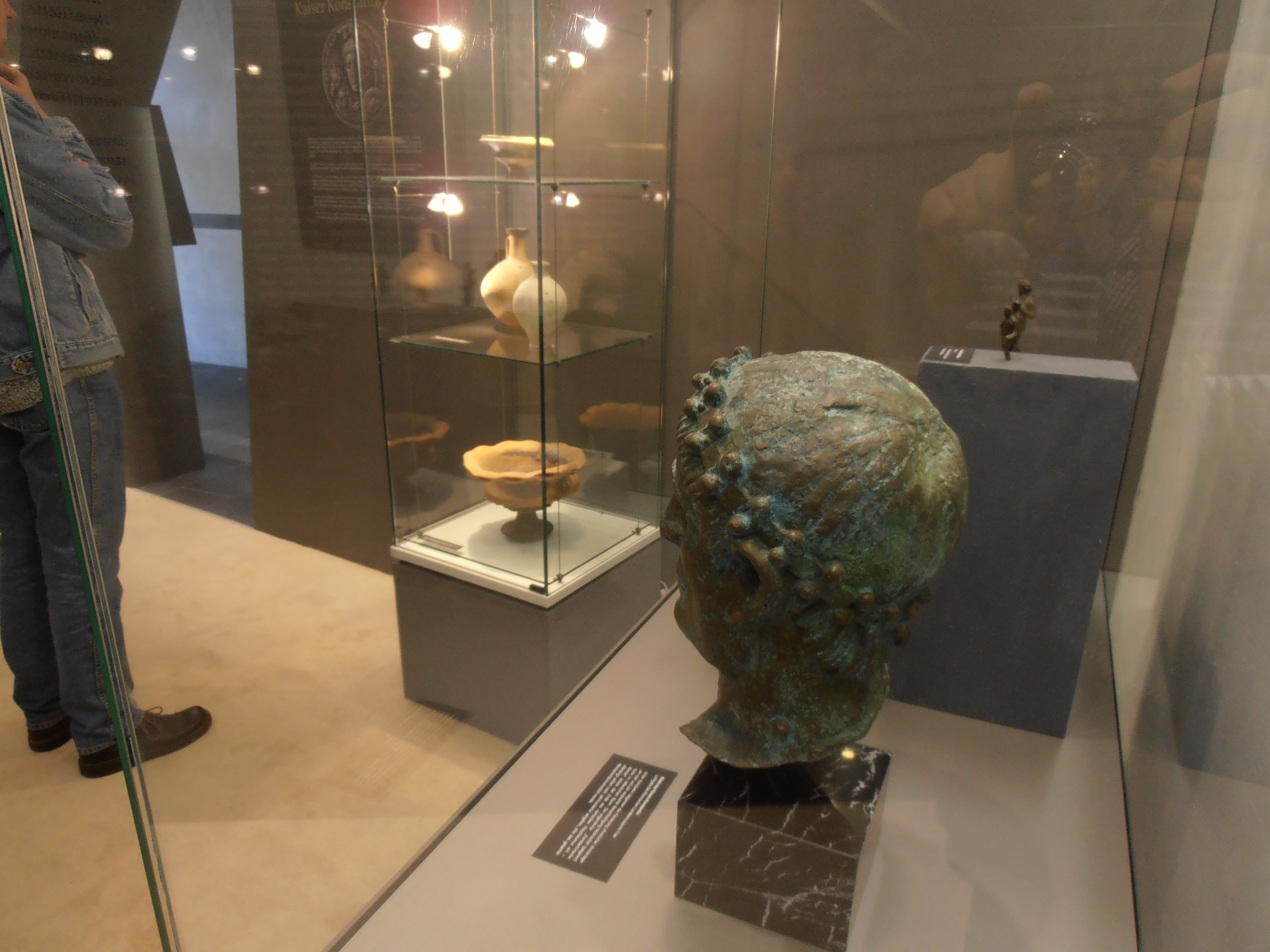
Emperor Kontantinus

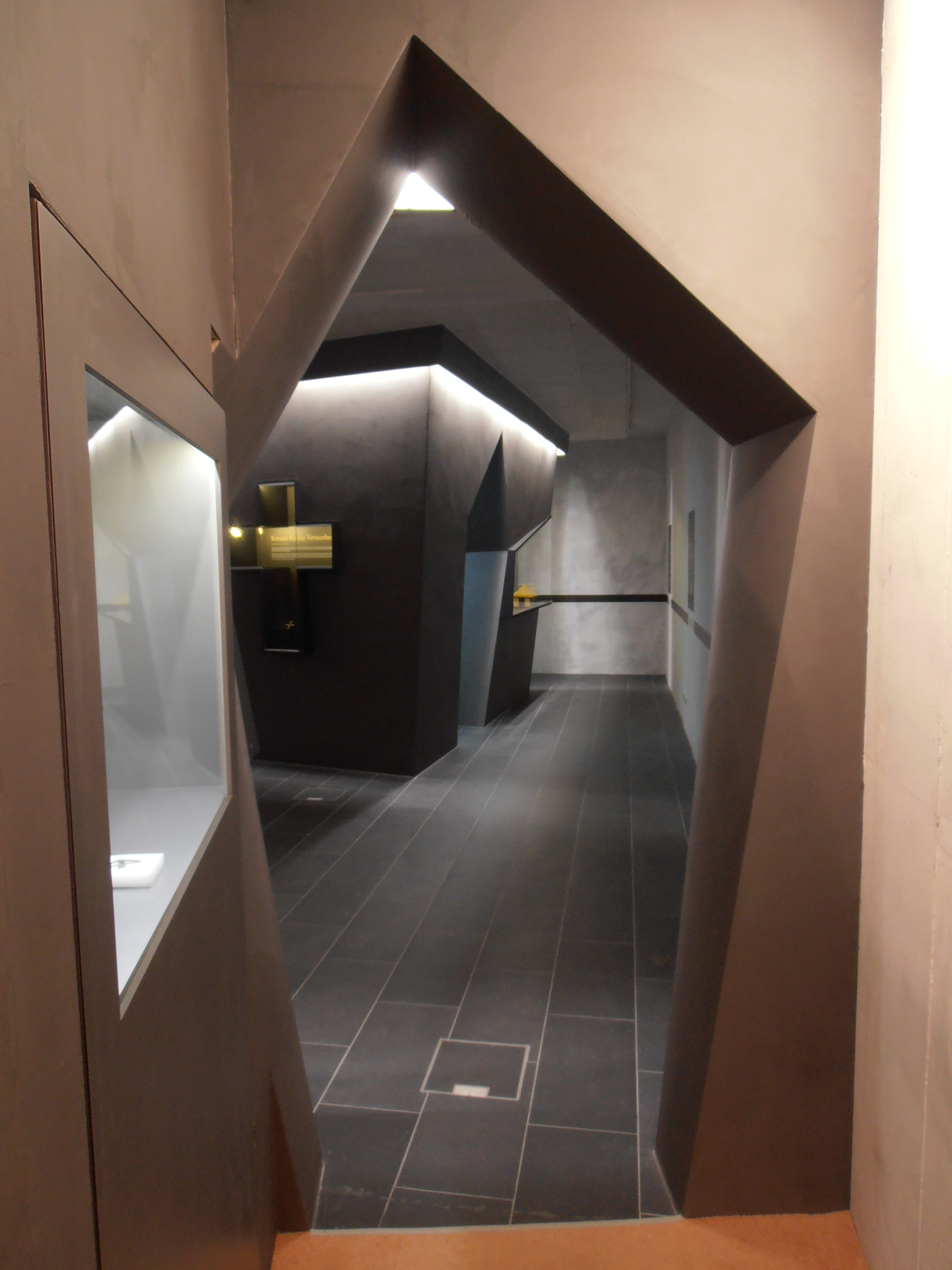
Doorways

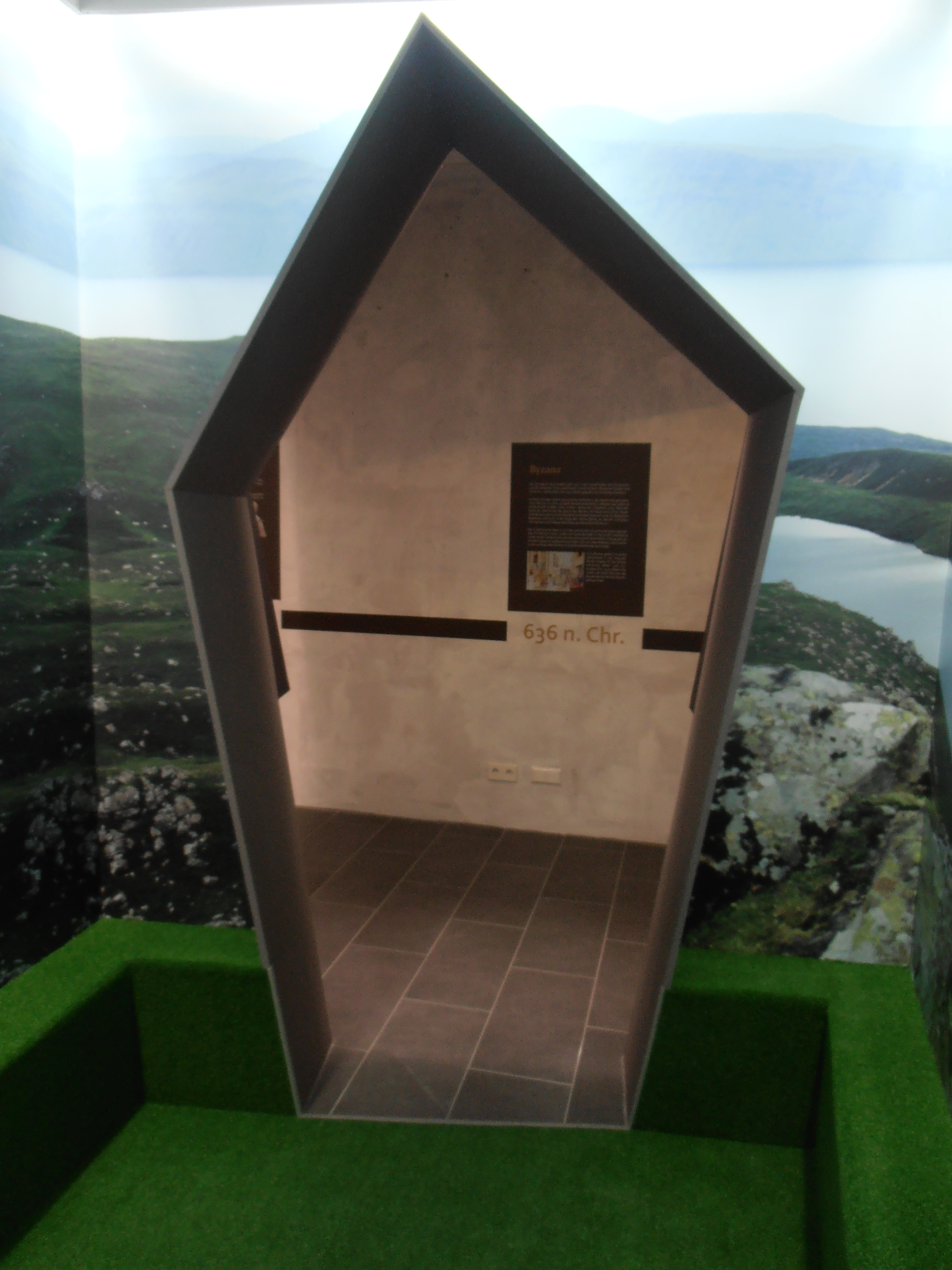
Inside looking

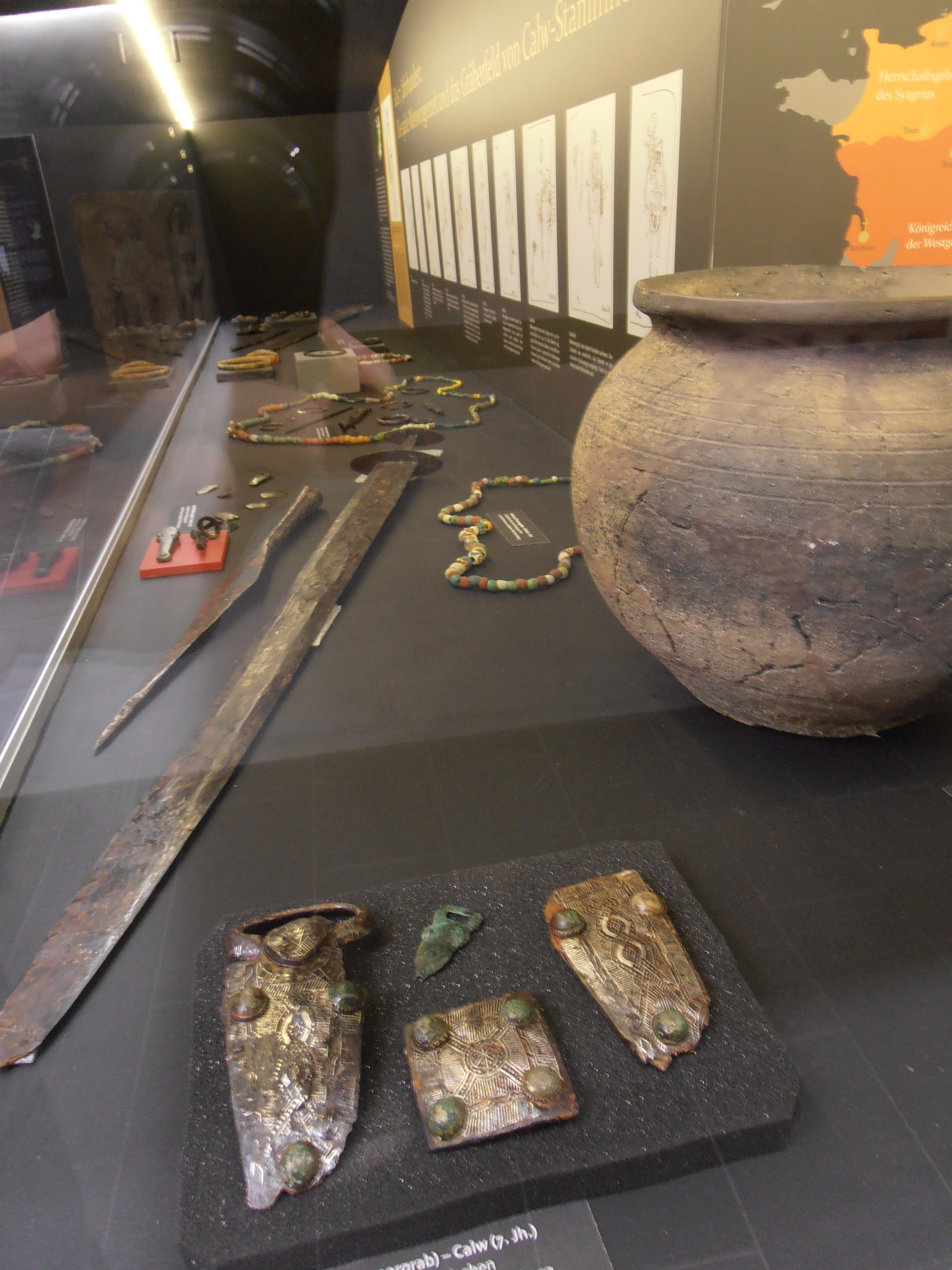
Local burial objects

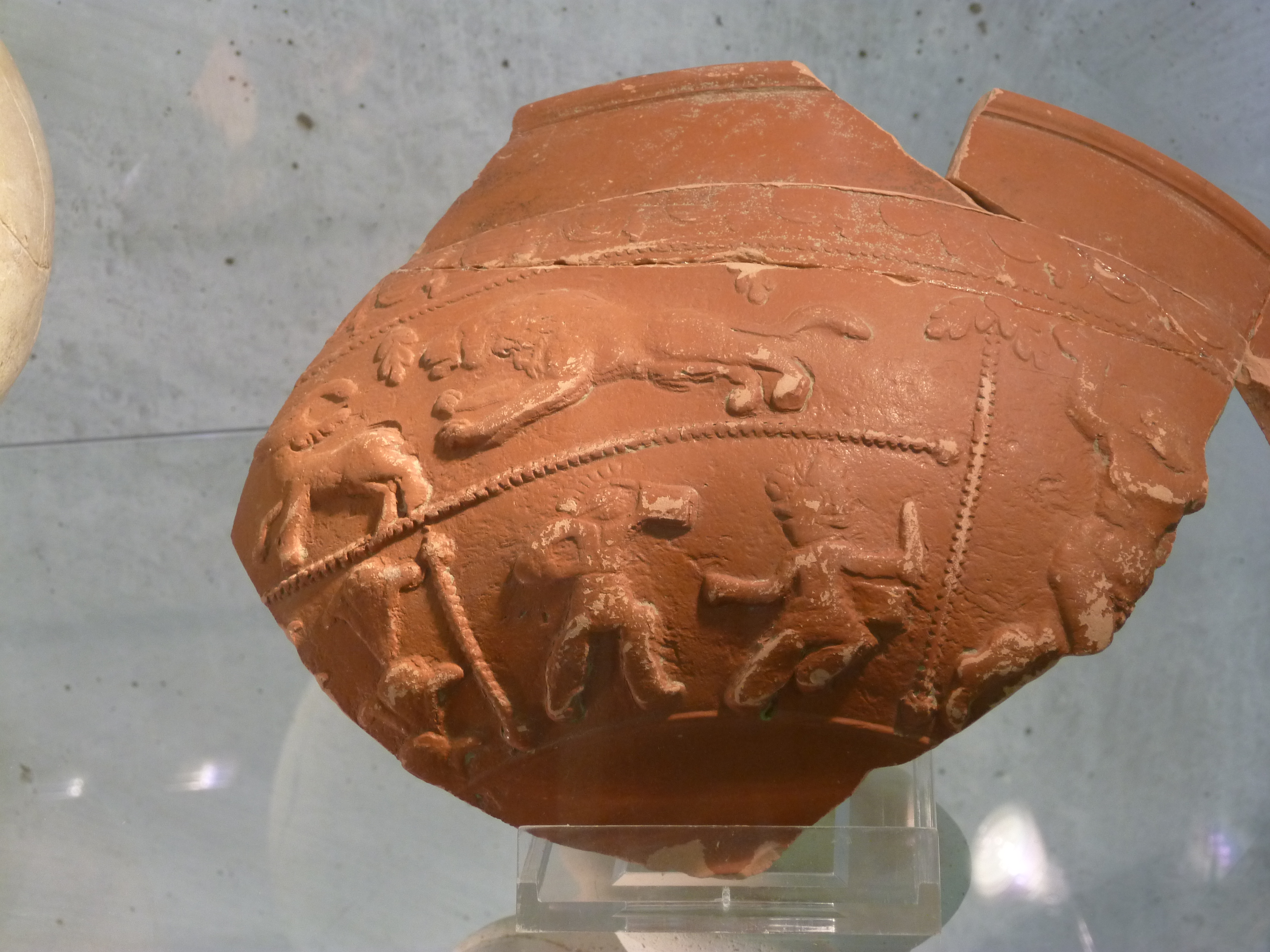
Terra Sigillata
