= Wilferdingen =

- Ortsteil of Remchingen
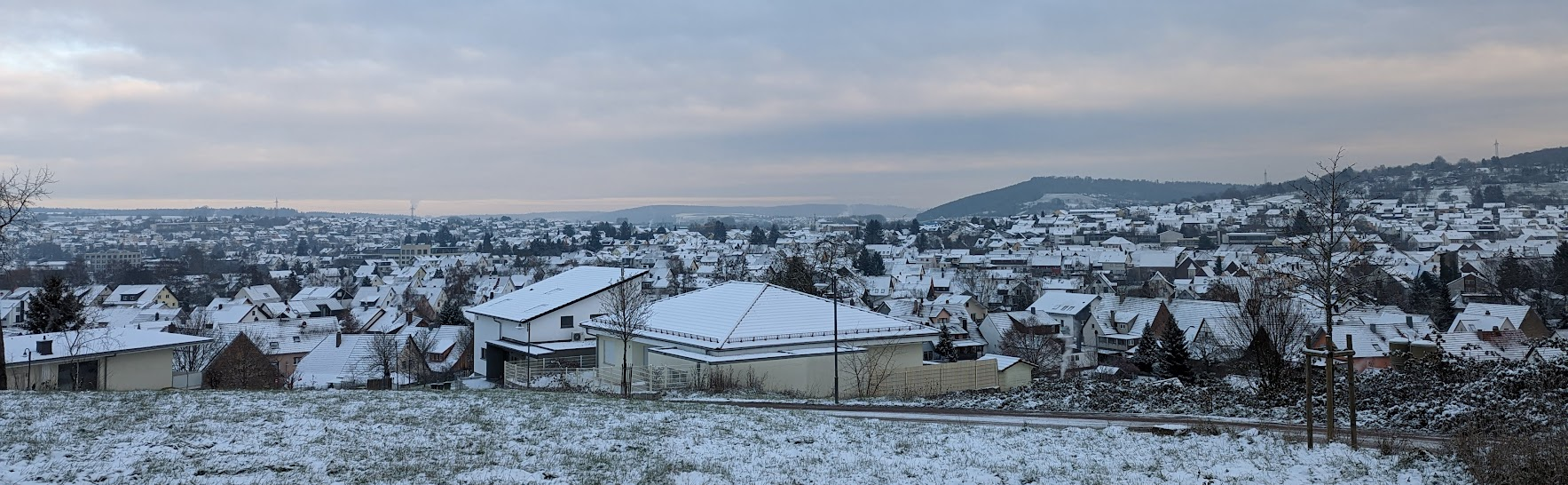

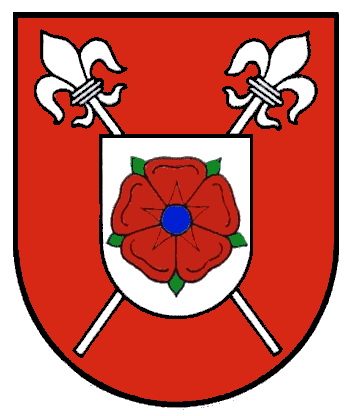
- Coat of arms
- Interactive map of Wilferdingen
- Location within Germany Location within Baden-Württemberg
- Coordinates: 48°56′47.04″N 8°34′42.24″E
- Country: Germany
- State: Baden-Württemberg
- District: Enzkreis
- Municipality: Remchingen

Area
  - Total: 7.34 km^{2} (2.83 sq mi)
- Elevation: 158 m (518 ft)

Population (2022)
  - Total: 5,189
  - Density: 707/km^{2} (1,830/sq mi)
- Time zone: UTC+01:00 (CET)
  - Summer (DST): UTC+02:00 (CEST)
- Postal codes: 75196
- Dialling codes: 07232
- Vehicle registration: PF
- Website: remchingen.de/wilferdingen

Wilferdingen is the largest district of the municipality of Remchingen in the Enzkreis region of Baden-Württemberg, Germany.

== History ==
In former times Wilferdingen was inhabited by Romans. At the Niemandsberg in Wilferdingen an old Roman house could be excavated. Wilferdingen was an independent municipality until 1973. On January 1, 1973, Wilferdingen merged with Singen to form the municipality of Remchingen.

=== Name ===
The name Wilferdingen derives from the Old High German personal name Wulfrich and means "at Wulfrich's family". The oldest recorded spelling comes from a document of Lorsch Abbey from the year 893, in which the place is mentioned as Wulvirincha. In later centuries, the name appears in various forms, often in connection with Remchingen. Around the year 1700, the spelling Wilfertingen is documented in church records.

=== Population development ===
Jahr	Einwohner
1852	873
1871	969
1880	1048
1890	1155
1900	1285
1910	1436
1925	1703
1933	1821
1939	1873
1950	2394
1956	2645
1961	2885
1970	3413
2022	5189
2025	5253

== Geography ==
Wilferdingen is located in the center of Remchingen. It is central and is bordered by Singen and Darmsbach. Darmsbach borders the district at the southwestern tip. The northern border of Wilferdingen converges at the border of Singen. The river Pfinz, which is a tributary of the Rhine, runs through Wilferdingen.

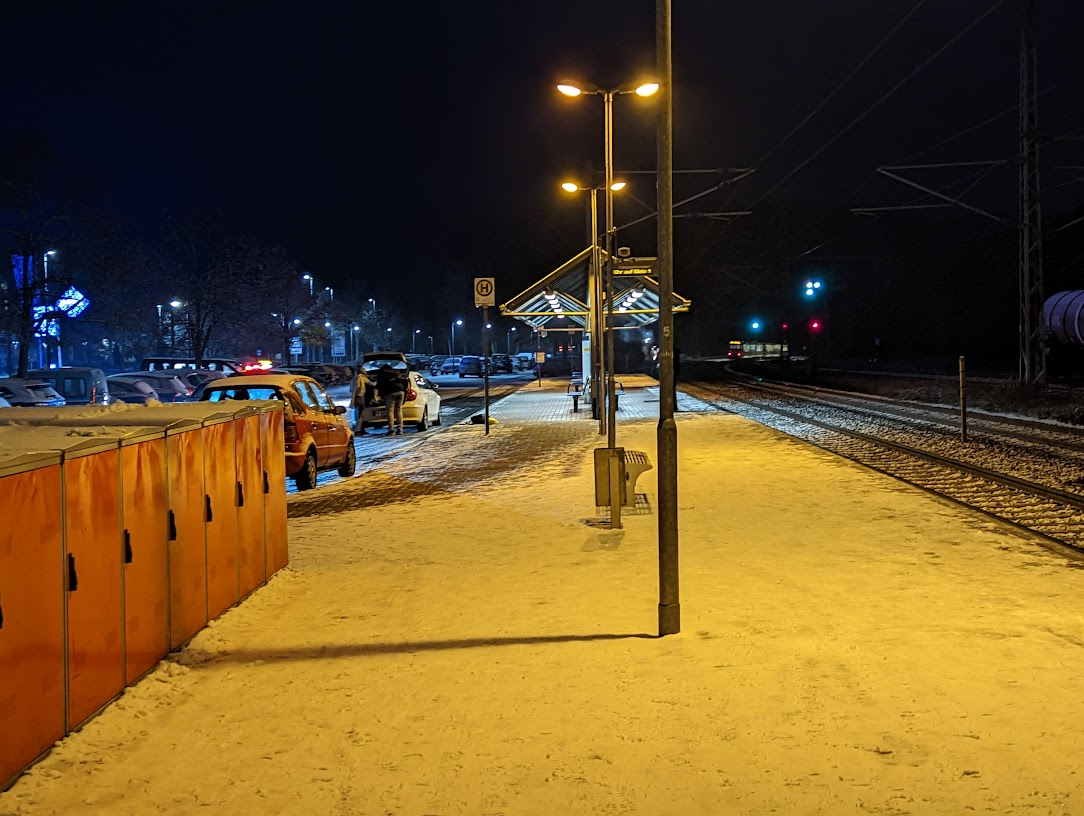
Wilferdingen-Singen station

== Transportation ==
Through Wilferdingen runs the Bundesstraße 10 which leads further to Karlsruhe and Pforzheim. There are also bus stops in Wilferdingen. On the border between Wilferdingen and Singen runs the railroad line Karlsruhe-Mühlacker. Thus, there is the station Wilferdingen-Singen in Wilferdingen. The station also connects Wilferdingen and Singen with the help of an underpass. From the station you can get to Karlsruhe, Pforzheim and Stuttgart, among other places. Light rail, Interregio-Express and Regional-Express stop here. Furthermore, a small airfield can be found in Wilferdingen.

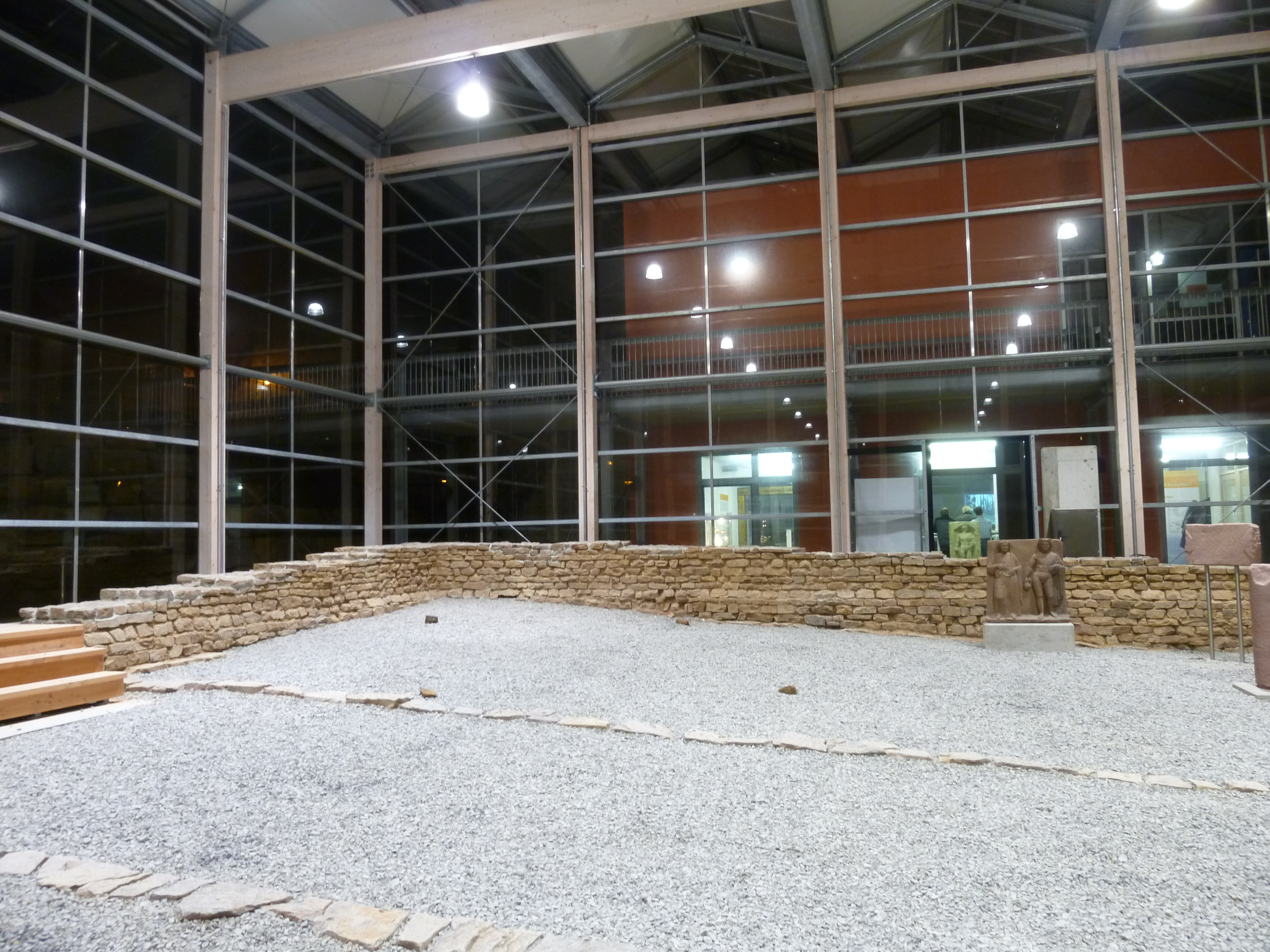
Roman Museum Remchingen

== Tourism ==
=== Museums ===
There are two museums in Wilferdingen. The Roman Museum Remchingen is a museum in Wilferdingen. There an old Roman house is exhibited together with other exhibits. There is also a telephone booth museum on the Wilferdingen side of the railroad tracks at the "Old Signal Box", which exhibits telephones and telephone booths.

=== Concerts, theatre and conventions ===
There is the Kulturhalle Remchingen in Wilferdingen. It is a concert hall, event and conference center. Artists such as Motörhead guitarist Phil Campbell, Max Giesinger, Culcha Candela, Glasperlenspiel and much more have performed at the Kulturhalle.
