= Verkehrsverbund Pforzheim-Enzkreis =

Former transport association in Baden-Württemberg, Germany

- Company type: GmbH
- Industry: Public transport
- Founded: 1 June 1997
- Defunct: 1 January 2026
- Fate: Integrated into Karlsruher Verkehrsverbund (KVV)
- Successor: Karlsruher Verkehrsverbund (KVV)
- Headquarters: Pforzheim, Germany
- Area served: Pforzheim and Enzkreis
- Key people: Daniel Peikert (CEO); Dirk Büscher (Chairman)
- Number of employees: 12 (2023)
- Website: www.vpe.de

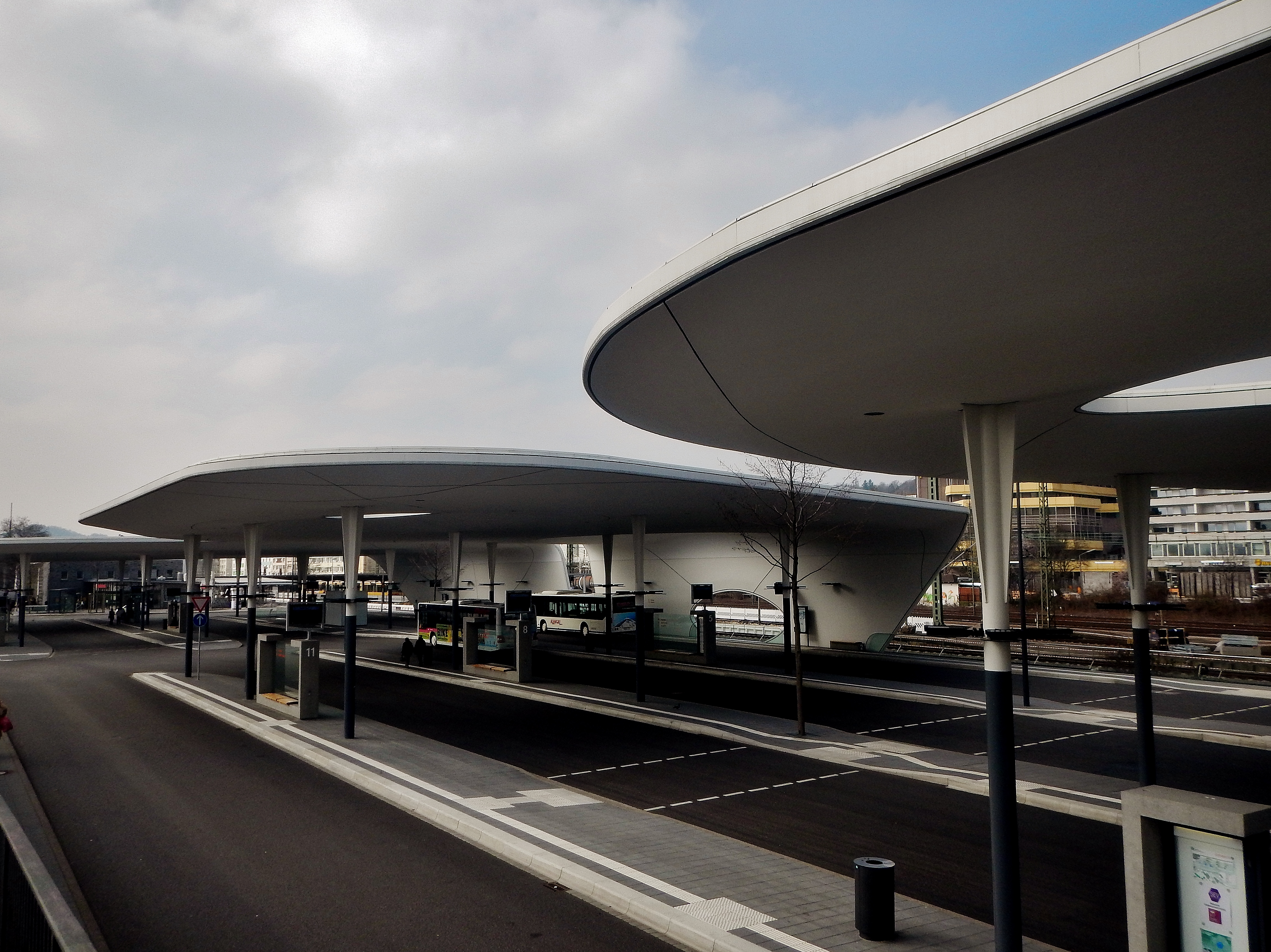
Pforzheim bus station, the central interchange point

The Verkehrsverbund Pforzheim-Enzkreis (VPE) (English: Pforzheim-Enzkreis transport association) was a transport association in the German state of Baden-Württemberg. It covered the independent city of Pforzheim and the surrounding district of Enzkreis. Founded on 1 June 1997, the association was officially integrated into the Karlsruher Verkehrsverbund (KVV) on 1 January 2026. During a transition period expected to last until December 2026, the existing VPE fare system remains valid before a unified KVV tariff is introduced.

The former VPE area covers around 938 km^{2} with a population of about 400,000. It includes 40 train stations and approximately 1,400 bus stops. Annual traffic volume is about 12.5 million vehicle-kilometres.

About 20 transport companies were part of the association, which transported over 40 million passengers in 2005.

On railway lines within the former VPE area, season tickets of the Karlsruher Verkehrsverbund are accepted during the transition phase, but not single tickets. Day tickets of KVV are valid with a surcharge (RegioSpezial).

Old logo of the VPE

== Area and neighbouring associations ==
The VPE bordered the following transport associations: Heilbronn Transport Association, Karlsruher Verkehrsverbund (KVV; now the absorbing association), Verkehrs- und Tarifverbund Stuttgart (VVS) and the Verkehrsgesellschaft Bäderkreis Calw (VGC).

== Tickets and information ==
Tickets are currently still available digitally via the DB Navigator app or through the "Handyticket Deutschland" service. Timetable information can be accessed through the DB Navigator, the VPE's own "VPE mobi" platform, and the statewide mobility portal bwegt.

The former association area remains part of the area of validity of the Metropolregion Stuttgart Ticket and the RegioXTicket.

== Transport companies ==
As of 2023, 20 companies operated services within the VPE, including:

- Albtal-Verkehrs-Gesellschaft mbH (AVG)
- Arverio Baden-Württemberg GmbH
- Regionalverkehr Alb-Bodensee GmbH (RAB)
- DB Regio AG
- SWEG Bahn Stuttgart GmbH
- RVS Regionalbusverkehr Südwest GmbH (SüdwestBus)
- Richard Eberhardt GmbH

(and others)

=== Rail transport operators (SPNV) ===
Four railway companies provide regional rail services in the former VPE area:

- Albtal-Verkehrs-Gesellschaft (lines S5, S51, S6 within the Karlsruhe S-Bahn)
- Arverio Baden-Württemberg (RE1)
- SWEG Bahn Stuttgart (MEX/RE/RB lines 17)
- DB Regio (RB74)

== Municipalities covered ==
The following municipalities are part of the former VPE area:

- Birkenfeld
- Heimsheim – also part of Verkehrs- und Tarifverbund Stuttgart -
- Illingen
- Ispringen
- Keltern
- Knittlingen – was already part of Karlsruher Verkehrsverbund before the merger –
- Maulbronn
- Mühlacker
- Niefern-Öschelbronn
- Ölbronn-Dürrn
- Pforzheim
- Remchingen – was already part of Karlsruher Verkehrsverbund before the merger –
- Straubenhardt
- Vaihingen
- Eisingen
- Königsbach-Stein
- Engelsbrand
- Friolzheim
- Kämpfelbach
- Kieselbronn
- Mönsheim
- Neuenbürg
- Neuhausen
- Neulingen
- Ötisheim
- Sternenfels
- Tiefenbronn
- Wiernsheim
- Wimsheim
- Wurmberg

== Integration into Karlsruher Verkehrsverbund ==
Due to the small size of the association compared to other networks in Baden-Württemberg (there are 19 associations in the state), the alignment and future of the VPE had been under discussion for years. In July 2021, members of the city council of Pforzheim (FDP and Greens) submitted a proposal to dissolve the VPE and integrate it into a neighbouring association such as KVV or VVS. In January 2022, CDU representatives proposed creating a larger "Nordschwarzwald-Rhein-Verbund" integrating VPE with neighbouring associations.

In February 2025, shareholders of VPE and KVV signed a memorandum of understanding on the integration of VPE into the Karlsruhe Transport Association. In December 2025, the city council of Pforzheim and the district council of Enzkreis officially approved the merger. The integration was notarised on 18 December 2025, making the city of Pforzheim and the Enzkreis shareholders of the KVV as of 1 January 2026.

While the organisational structure of the VPE is being dissolved, the existing VPE fare system continues to apply transitionally until the planned introduction of a unified KVV tariff in December 2026.

== See also ==
- List of German transport associations
