= Enz (electoral district) =

State electoral district of Germany

44: Enz
- Electoral district for the Landtag of Baden-Württemberg
- Enz in 2026
- District: Enzkreis
- Electorate: 126,268 (2026)
- Major settlements: Eisingen, Friolzheim, Heimsheim, Illingen, Kämpfelbach, Keltern, Knittlingen, Königsbach-Stein, Maulbronn, Mönsheim, Mühlacker, Neuenbürg, Neuhausen, Neulingen, Niefern-Öschelbronn, Ölbronn-Dürrn, Ötisheim, Remchingen, Sternenfels, Straubenhardt, Tiefenbronn, Wiernsheim, Wimsheim, and Wurmberg

Current electoral district
- Party: CDU
- Member: Nico Gunzelmann

Enz is an electoral constituency (German: Wahlkreis) represented in the Landtag of Baden-Württemberg.

Since 2026, it has elected one member via first-past-the-post voting. Voters cast a second vote under which additional seats are allocated proportionally state-wide. Under the constituency numbering system, it is designated as constituency 44.

It is wholly within the district of Enzkreis.

== Geography ==
The constituency includes the municipalities of Eisingen, Friolzheim, Heimsheim, Illingen, Kämpfelbach, Keltern, Knittlingen, Königsbach-Stein, Maulbronn, Mönsheim, Mühlacker, Neuenbürg, Neuhausen, Neulingen, Niefern-Öschelbronn, Ölbronn-Dürrn, Ötisheim, Remchingen, Sternenfels, Straubenhardt, Tiefenbronn, Wiernsheim, Wimsheim, and Wurmberg, within the district of Enzkreis.

There were 126,268 eligible voters in 2026.

== Members ==
=== First mandate ===
Both prior to and since the electoral reforms for the 2026 election, the winner of the plurality of the vote (first-past-the-post) in every constituency won the first mandate.

Election	Member	Party	%
1976	Hans Roth	CDU	
1980	Hans Roth	CDU	
1984	Hans Roth	CDU	
1988	Winfried Scheuermann	CDU	
1992	Winfried Scheuermann	CDU	
1996	Winfried Scheuermann	CDU	
2001	Winfried Scheuermann	CDU	
2006	Winfried Scheuermann	CDU	40.1
2011	Viktoria Schmid	CDU	40.7
2016	Stefanie Seemann	Grüne	26.9
2021	Stefanie Seemann	Grüne	30.9
2026	Nico Gunzelmann	CDU	28.8

=== Second mandate ===
Prior to the electoral reforms for the 2026 election, the seats in the state parliament were allocated proportionately amongst parties which received more than 5% of valid votes across the state. The seats that were won proportionally for parties that did not win as many first mandates as seats they were entitled to, were allocated to their candidates which received the highest proportion of the vote in their respective constituencies. This meant that following some elections, a constituency would have one or more members elected under a second mandate.

Prior to 2011, these second mandates were allocated to the party candidates who got the greatest number of votes, whilst from 2011-2021, these were allocated according to percentage share of the vote.

Election	Member	Party	Member	Party	Member	Party	Member	Party
1976	Gottfried Haase	SPD	Hans Albrecht	FDP				
1980	Bernd Kielburger	SPD	Hans Albrecht	FDP				
1984	Bernd Kielburger	SPD	Hans Albrecht	FDP	Hans Albrecht	Grüne		
1988	Bernd Kielburger	SPD	Hans Albrecht	FDP	Hans Albrecht	Grüne		
Jan 1992	Bernd Kielburger	SPD	Hans Albrecht	FDP	Ulrich Noller	Grüne		
1992	Bernd Kielburger	SPD	Hans Albrecht	FDP	Rezzo Schlauch	Grüne	Klaus Rapp	REP
Dec 1994	Bernd Kielburger	SPD	Hans Albrecht	FDP	Ivo Krieg	Grüne	Klaus Rapp	REP
Mar 1995	Bernd Kielburger	SPD	Ewald Veigel	FDP	Ivo Krieg	Grüne	Klaus Rapp	REP
1996	Bernd Kielburger	SPD	Ewald Veigel	FDP	Renate Thon	Grüne	Klaus Rapp	REP
2001	Thomas Knapp	SPD						
2006	Thomas Knapp	SPD	Hans-Ulrich Rülke	FDP				
2011			Hans-Ulrich Rülke	FDP				
2016	Bernd Gögel	AfD	Erik Schweickert	FDP				
2021	Bernd Gögel	AfD	Erik Schweickert	FDP				

== Election results ==
=== 2026 election ===
State election (2026): Enz
Notes:	Blue background denotes the winner of the electorate vote. Pink background denotes a candidate elected from their party list. Yellow background denotes an electorate win by a list member, or other incumbent. A ✓ or ✗ denotes status of any incumbent, win or lose respectively.						
Party	Candidate	Votes	%	±%	Party votes	%	±%
CDU	Nico Gunzelmann	28,047	31.2	▲11.7	25,964	28.8	▲9.3
AfD	Alexander Steblau	20,458	22.8	▲9.8	20,416	22.6	▲9.7
Greens	✗ Stefanie Seemann	18,567	20.7	▼10.2	23,612	26.2	▼4.7
FDP	Erik Schweickert	11,659	13.0	▼4.0	6,494	7.2	▼9.8
SPD	Michael Hofsäß	6,367	7.1	▼2.4	4,583	5.1	▼4.4
Left	Cedric Strauß	3,098	3.4	▲1.1	2,641	2.9	▲0.6
FW					1,618	1.8	▼1.0
BSW					1,088	1.2	
APT					1,081	1.2	
Volt	Vera Seifert	1,660	1.8	▲1.2	752	0.8	▲0.2
Bündnis C					377	0.4	▼0.8
PARTEI					371	0.4	
Values					273	0.3	
dieBasis					208	0.2	
Pensioners					190	0.2	
Team Todenhöfer					180	0.2	
ÖDP					111	0.1	▼0.6
PdF					73	0.1	
Verjüngungsforschung					65	0.1	
KlimalisteBW					35	0.0	▼0.8
Humanists					24	0.0	
Informal votes		803			503		
Total valid votes		89,856			90,156		
Turnout		90,659	71.8	▲5.5			
CDU gain from Greens	Majority	7,589	8.4				

== See also ==
- Politics of Baden-Württemberg
- Landtag of Baden-Württemberg
