= Knittlingen =

German town

- Town
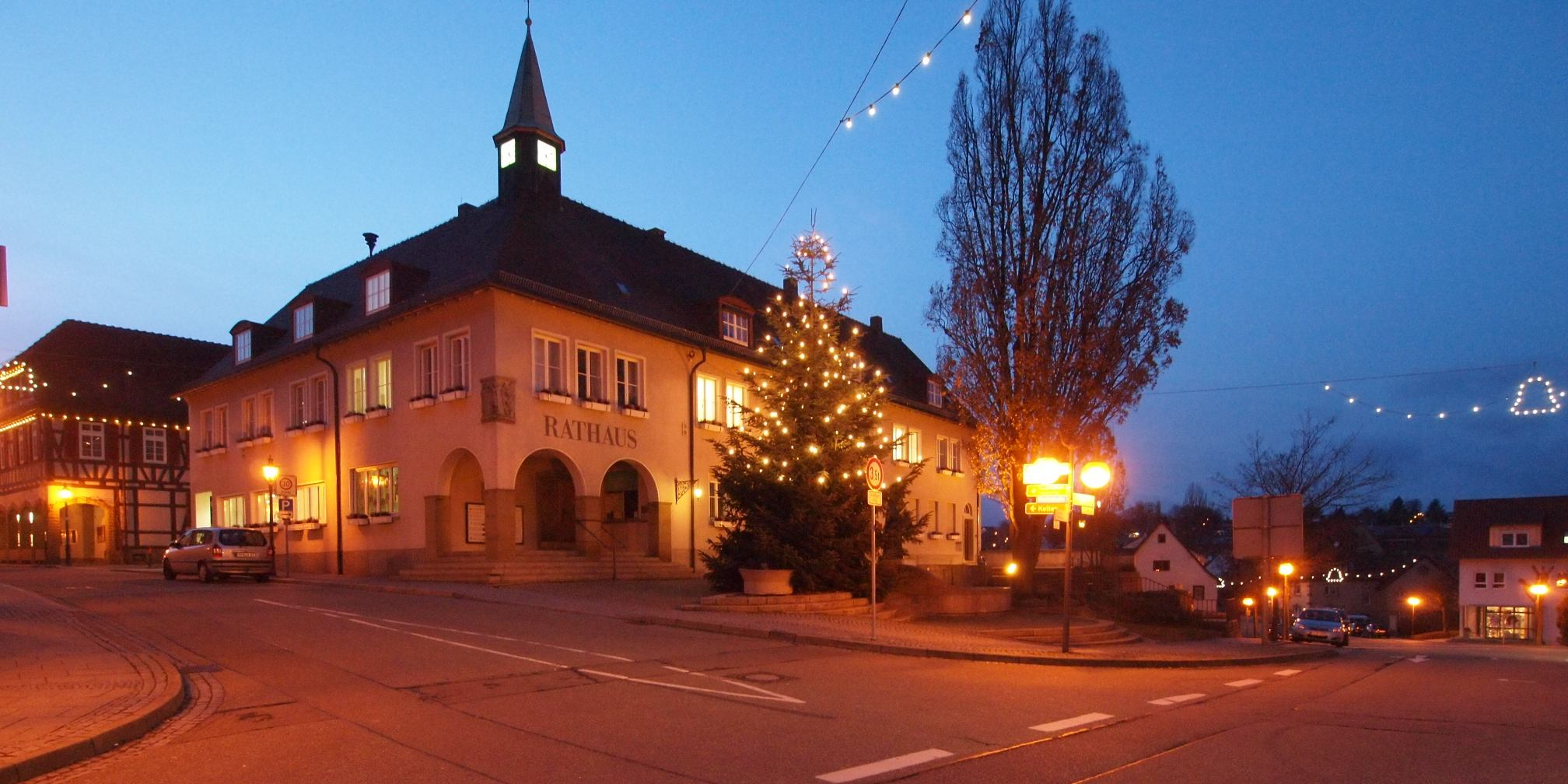
- Town hall

- Coat of arms

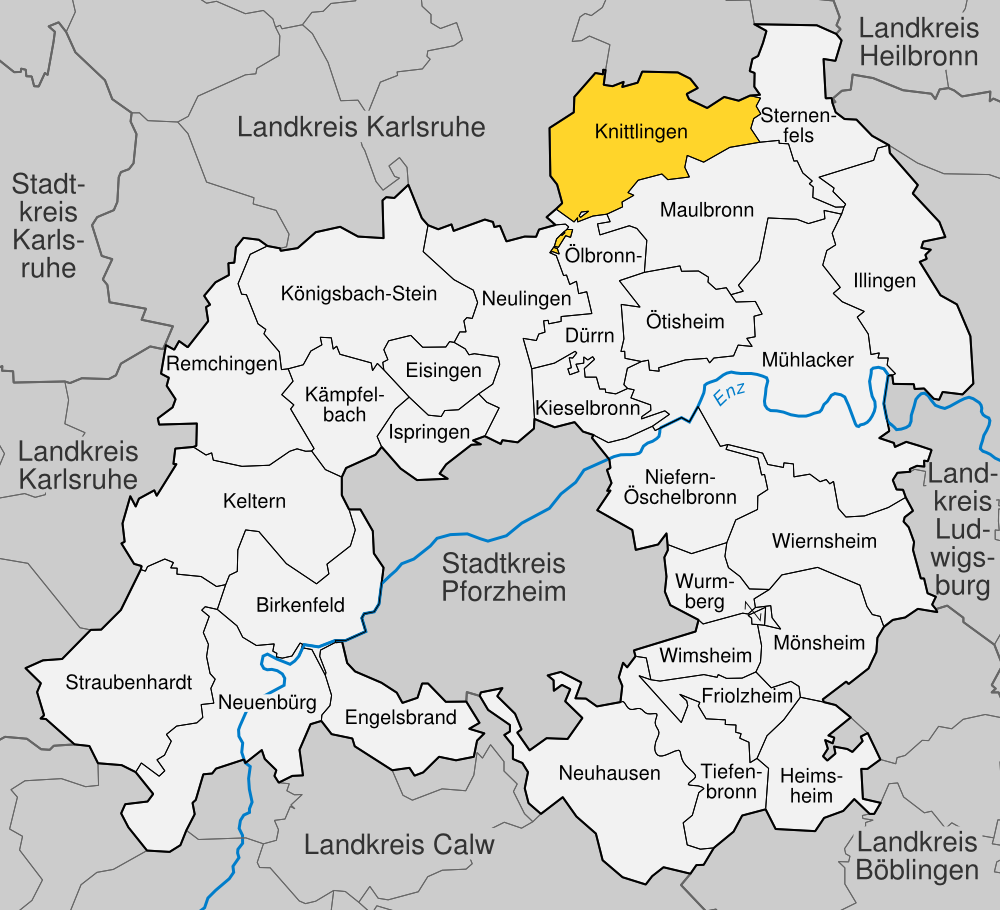
- Location of Knittlingen within Enzkreis district
- Interactive map of Knittlingen
- Location within Germany Location within Baden-Württemberg
- Coordinates: 49°1′26″N 8°45′25″E
- Country: Germany
- State: Baden-Württemberg
- Admin. region: Karlsruhe
- District: Enzkreis

Government
  - Mayor (2021–29): Alexander Kozel

Area
  - Total: 26.33 km^{2} (10.17 sq mi)
- Elevation: 196 m (643 ft)

Population (2025-12-31)
  - Total: 8,138
  - Density: 309.1/km^{2} (800.5/sq mi)
- Time zone: UTC+01:00 (CET)
  - Summer (DST): UTC+02:00 (CEST)
- Postal codes: 75438
- Dialling codes: 07043 und 07045
- Vehicle registration: PF
- Website: www.knittlingen.de

Knittlingen (German pronunciation: [ˈknɪtlɪŋən]) is a town in the Enz district in Baden-Württemberg in southern Germany.

It lies at the eastern edge of the Kraichgau in the centre of a rectangle that is formed by Heidelberg, Karlsruhe, Heilbronn, and Stuttgart.

The centre of Knittlingen consists of many old half-timbered houses.

== Neighbouring municipalities ==
Neighbouring towns and municipalities (clockwise): Sternenfels, Maulbronn, Ölbronn-Dürrn, (all Enz (district)), Bretten, and Oberderdingen, (both Karlsruhe (district)).

== Transport ==
The motorways A5 (Bruchsal or Karlsruhe-Exit), A6 (Eppingen-Exit) and A8 Pforzheim-Exit are reachable within approximately 30 minutes.

Knittlingen-Kleinvillars station is located on the Württemberg Western Railway and is served by Karlsruhe Stadtbahn S 9 services to Karlsruhe, Bruchsal and Mühlacker.

The nearest airport is part of the Baden Airpark (officially Flughafen Karlsruhe/Baden-Baden) about 70 km southwest of Knittlingen, with regular connections to airports in Germany and Europe in general. Frankfurt International Airport can be reach in about an hour and a half by car, whereas Stuttgart Airport can be reached in about one hour.

== History ==
Knittlingen was founded during the Frankish period. Records from the year 843 refer to it by the name "Cnudelingen." It was a possession of various religious and secular territories, including the Margraviate of Baden, until it finally came into the possession of Maulbronn Abbey, which held it from that time forward.

In 1490, Maximilian I, established the first regular postal route in Europe between Innsbruck and the Netherlands. Knittlingen was used as a postal station in 1495 and 1499. It became a station once again in 1563, replacing Diedelsheim bei Bretten. Its use as a postal station brought many people to the town. The service station of the Thurn-und-Taxis-Post in Knittlingen reached the cities from Innsbruck to Brussels.

In 1360, in 1632 and again in 1692, the town was completely destroyed, having suffered greatly from being besieged, set on fire and sacked. Count Palatine Philipp set out from here on 10 May 1534, when he marched with his army to Lauffen to fight in the Battle of Lauffen. In 1632 during the Thirty Years War, Knittlingen was burned down by troops of General Ernesto Montecuccoli who fought on the side of the Empire. The important market road from Frankfurt am Main to Cannstatt via Speyer runs through the center of Knittlingen.

As a possession of Maulbronn Abbey, Knittlingen belonged to the territory of the Palatinate of the Rhine. Knittlingen received the official status of a city in 1840. Beginning in 1806, Knittlingen was part of the Maulbronn district, and from 1938 to 1972 part of the administrative district of Vaihingen an der Enz. After these districts were abolished, Knittlingen became part of the Enzkreis subdistrict in the Karlsruhe district.

The historical Faust, on whom the legends of Faust are based, was supposed to have been born here. Hence the city has a Faust archive and a Faust museum.

== Wine-growing ==
Knittlingen is one of the biggest wine-growing municipalities of Württemberg. Wine-growing was proved there for 700 years. Numerous sorts of wine are growing.

== Education ==
The Dr. Johannes-Faust-School is an elementary and secondary school and is attended by nearly 1000 students from all over the Enz (district). There are elementary schools in Freudenstein and Kleinvillars as well.

== Museum ==
- Dr. Johannes Faust Museum

== Personalities ==
- Johann Georg Faust
- Die Flippers

== Media ==
The Badischen Neuesten Nachrichten (BNN), a daily newspaper operating out of Karlsruhe and the Pforzheimer Zeitung.

== International relations ==
Knittlingen is twinned with:

- Benaojan (Spain)
- Montejaque (Spain)
