= Niemandsberg =

Mountain and residential area in Remchingen, Germany

Coordinates: 48°56′30″N 8°34′09″E

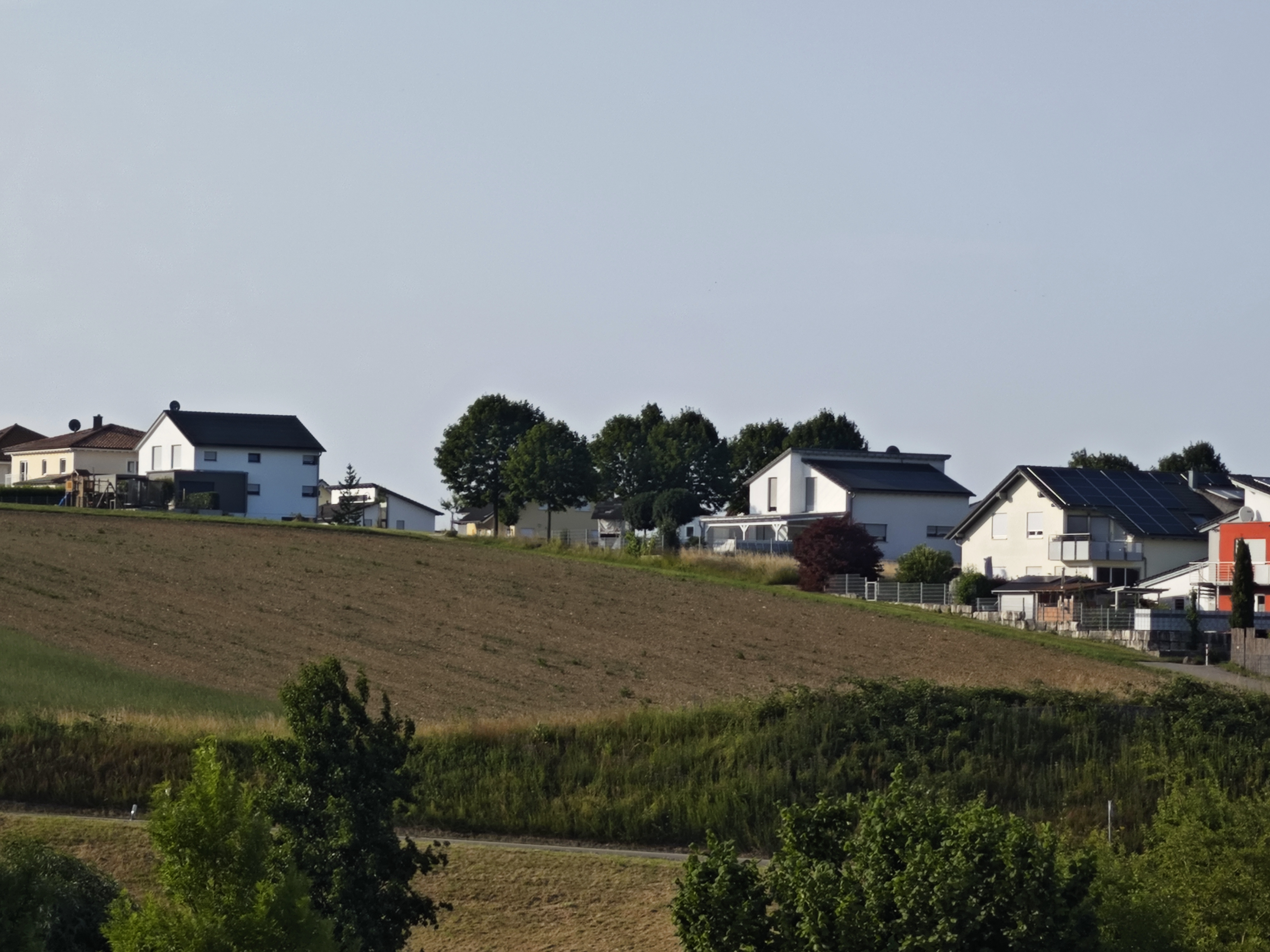

Highest point
- Elevation: 250 m (820 ft)

Naming
- English translation: No body's mountain
- Language of name: German

Geography
- Location: Wilferdingen, Remchingen, Enz district, Baden-Württemberg
- Country: Germany

Niemandsberg is a hill and residential area in the western part of Wilferdingen, a district of the municipality Remchingen in the Enzkreis district of Baden-Württemberg, Germany. Developed in the 2000s, the area is particularly known for its archaeological finds from the Roman Imperial period and its family-friendly urban design.

== Geography ==
Niemandsberg is situated on an elevation between the historic town center of Wilferdingen, Darmsbach, and adjacent fields and meadows. The elevation ranges between 180 and 250 meters above sea level. The area is accessed by the eponymous "Niemandsberg" street, with most of it designated as a traffic-calmed zone.

== History ==
Niemandsberg was the site of a Roman settlement from the 1st to 3rd centuries AD, centered around a villa rustica. This estate included a main building with a hypocaust heating system, outbuildings, and likely a bathhouse, indicating a relatively high standard of living. Finds of Sigillata pottery, coins from the Julio-Claudian to Severan periods, and tools attest to continuous habitation. The site was likely part of the Roman settlement network along the road connecting Portus (Pforzheim) and Grinario (Köngen). Like many Roman settlements in the region, the villa was abandoned around 260 AD during the Crisis of the Third Century. The archaeological finds are now displayed in the Roman Museum Remchingen.

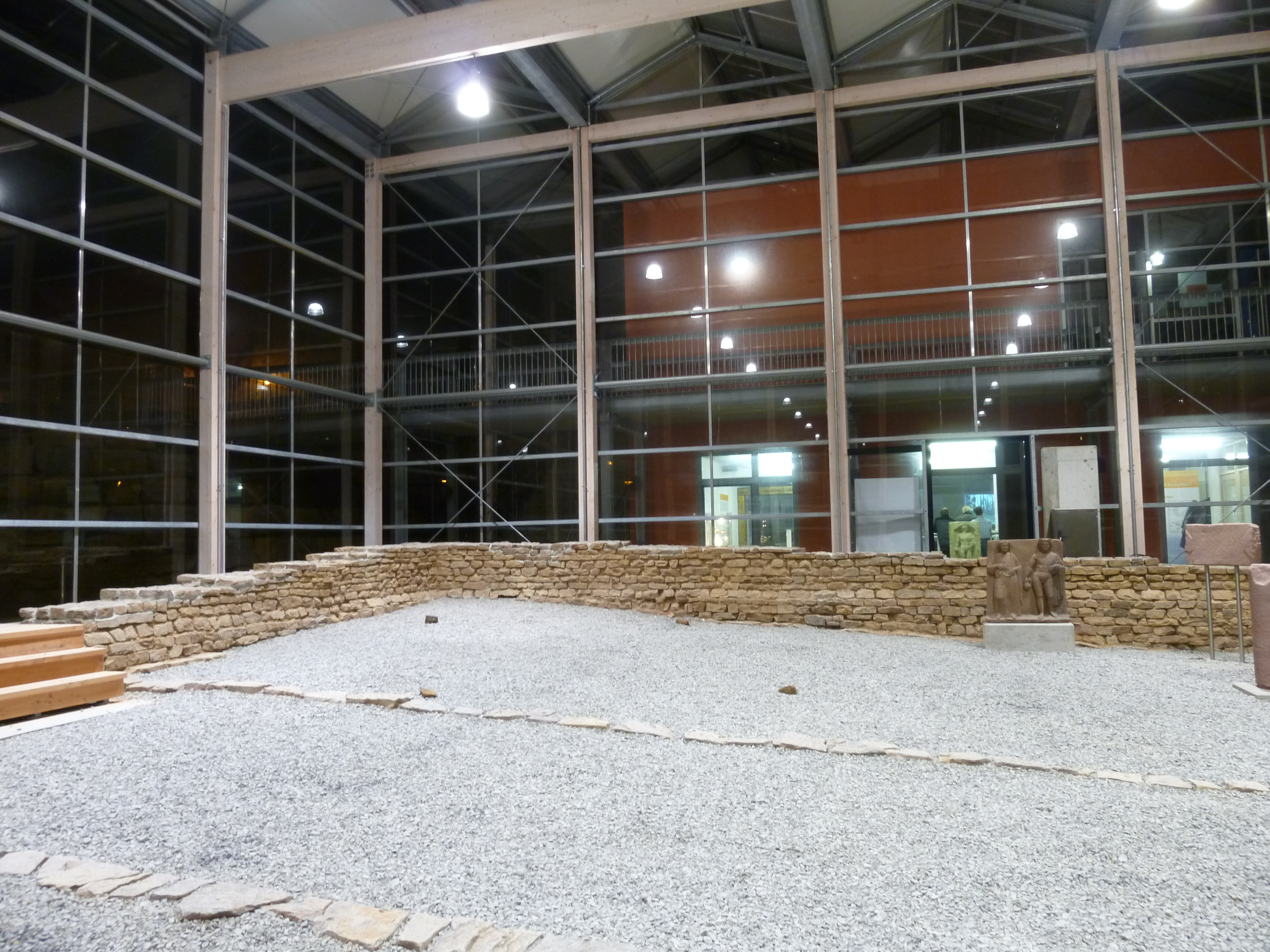
The Roman Museum Remchingen on Niemandsberg

The archaeological discoveries led to the establishment of the Roman Museum Remchingen in 2009, operated by the Remchingen Heritage Association. The museum on Niemandsberg features:

- Wall remains of the Roman estate
- Tools, pottery, and coins
- Reconstructions of Roman everyday objects
- Diorama of the historical use of the site

Before its development as a residential area, the site was used for agriculture. During construction work in the early 2000s, significant archaeological finds were made, leading to the discovery of the Roman villa rustica.

== Development and infrastructure ==
Development of Niemandsberg began in 2002 with:

- Single-family houses
- Semi-detached houses
- Terraced houses

The architecture follows contemporary energy-efficient standards. The concept includes:

- Children's playgrounds
- Green spaces with seating areas
- Kindergarten
- Traffic-calmed residential streets
- Bicycle parking facilities

Public transport is provided by a bus line of the Pforzheim-Enzkreis Transport Association (VPE) to Wilferdingen-Singen station (1.5 km away) and to Pforzheim Central Station. The bus stop is named "Remchingen-Römermuseum."

== Culture and sights ==
Notable attractions on Niemandsberg include:

- Roman Museum Remchingen
- Park with remains of the Villa Rustica cellar

== Gallery ==
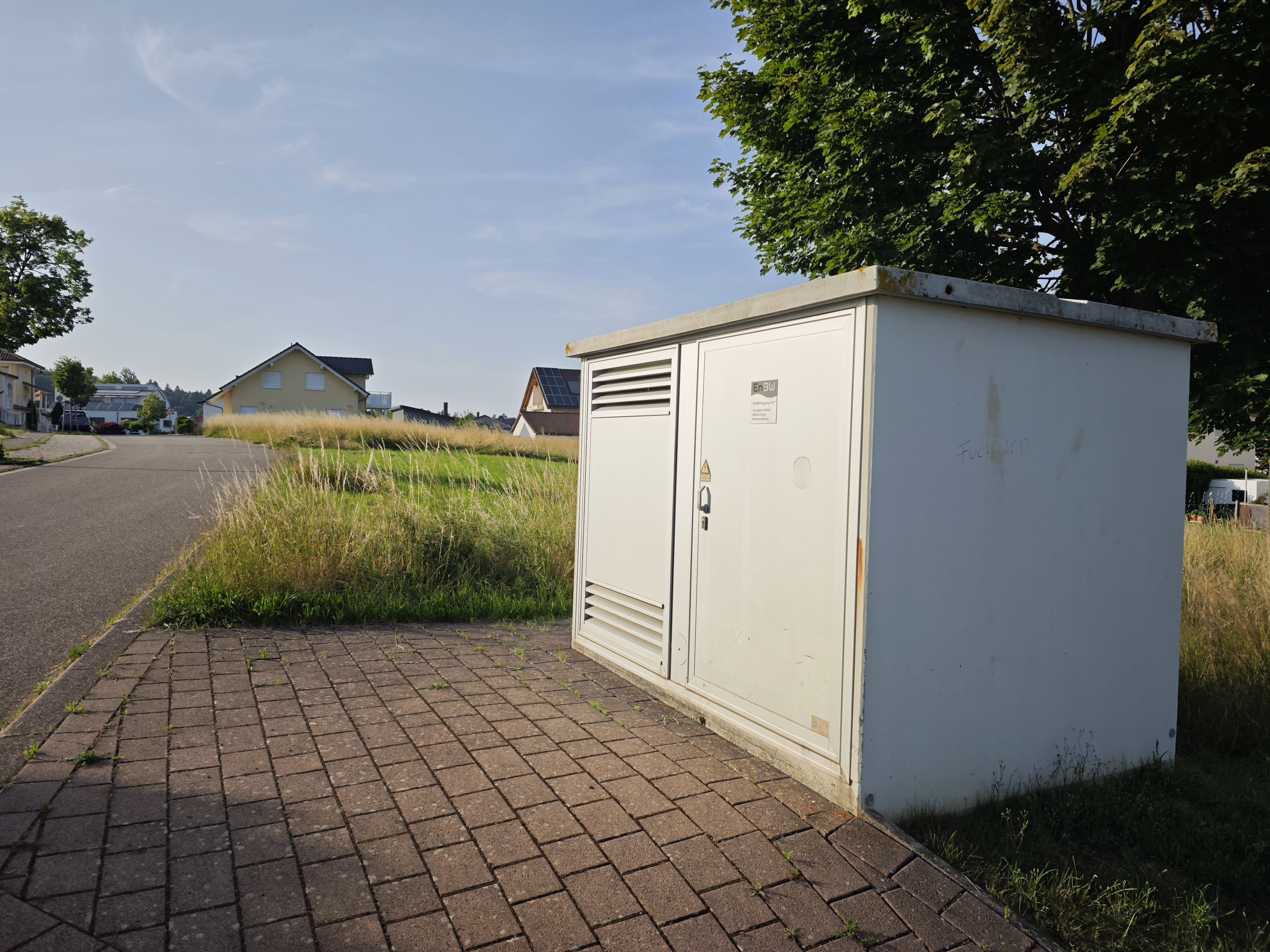
Transformer Station at the Niemandsberg

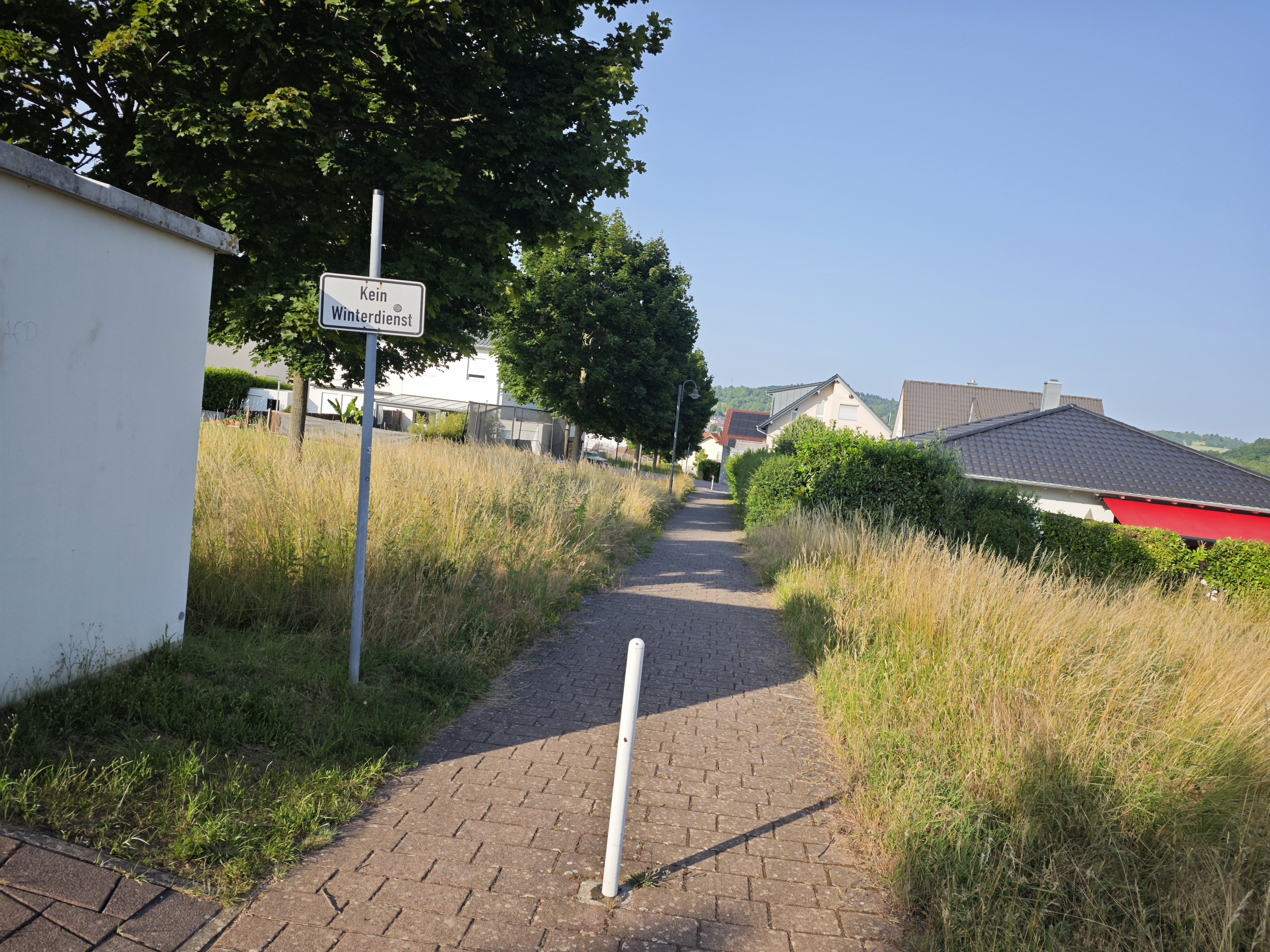
Footpath

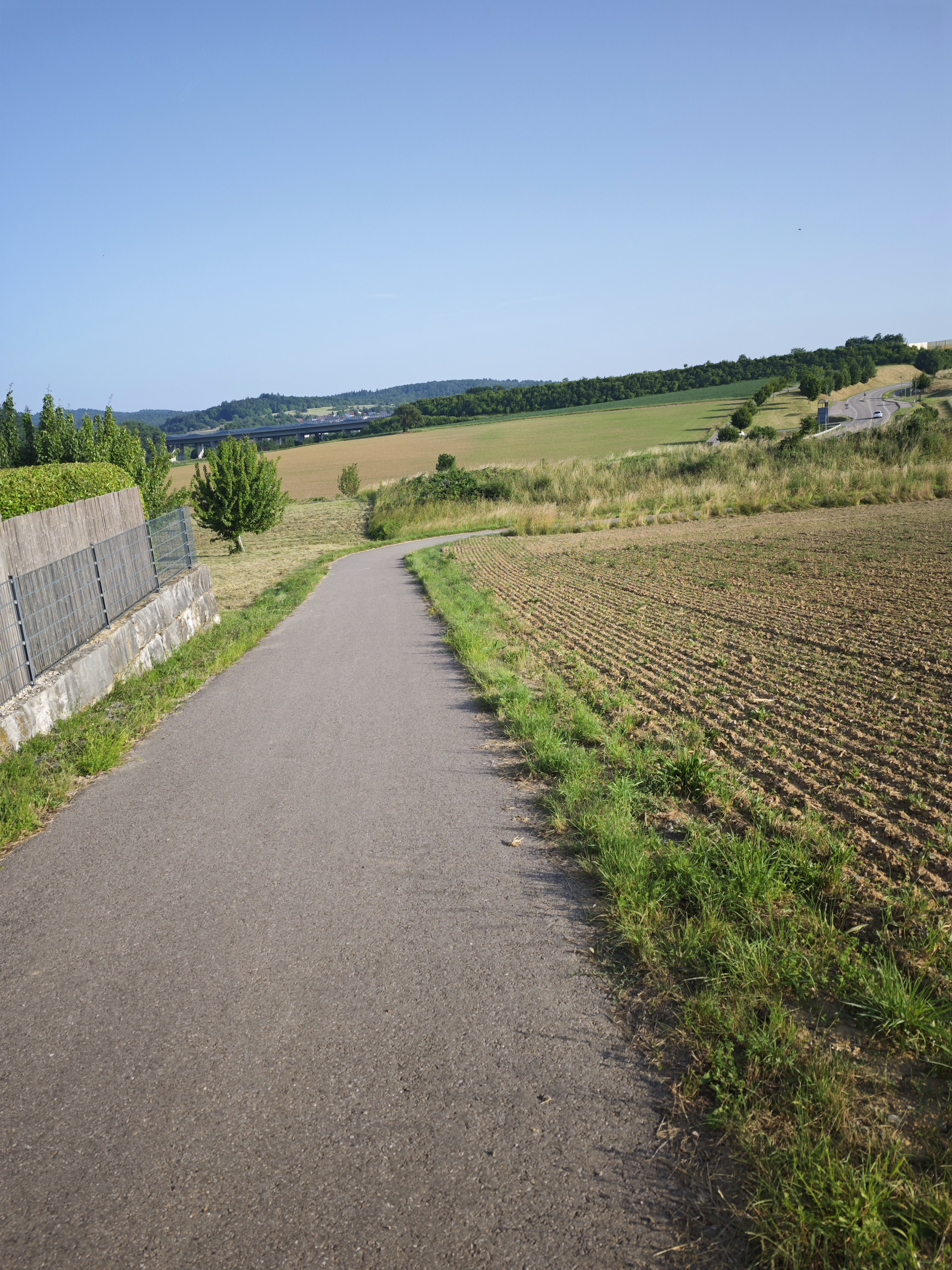
Footpath next to a field
