= Kämpfelbach (river) =

River in Germany

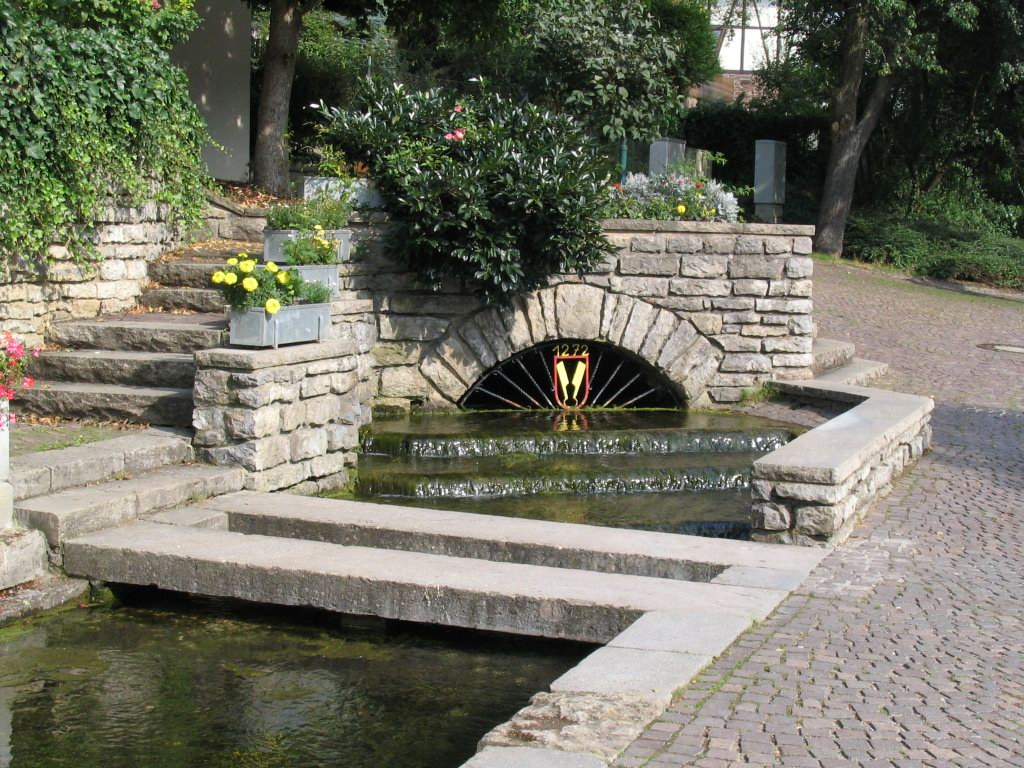

Location
- Country: Germany
- State: Baden-Württemberg

Physical characteristics
- Mouth
  - location: Pfinz
  - coordinates: 48.9558°N 8.5674°E
- Length: 11.3 km (7.0 mi)

Basin features
- Progression: Pfinz→ Rhine→ North Sea

Kämpfelbach is a river of Baden-Württemberg, Germany. It flows into the Pfinz in Remchingen.

== See also ==
- List of rivers of Baden-Württemberg
