= Kieselbronn =

German town

- Municipality
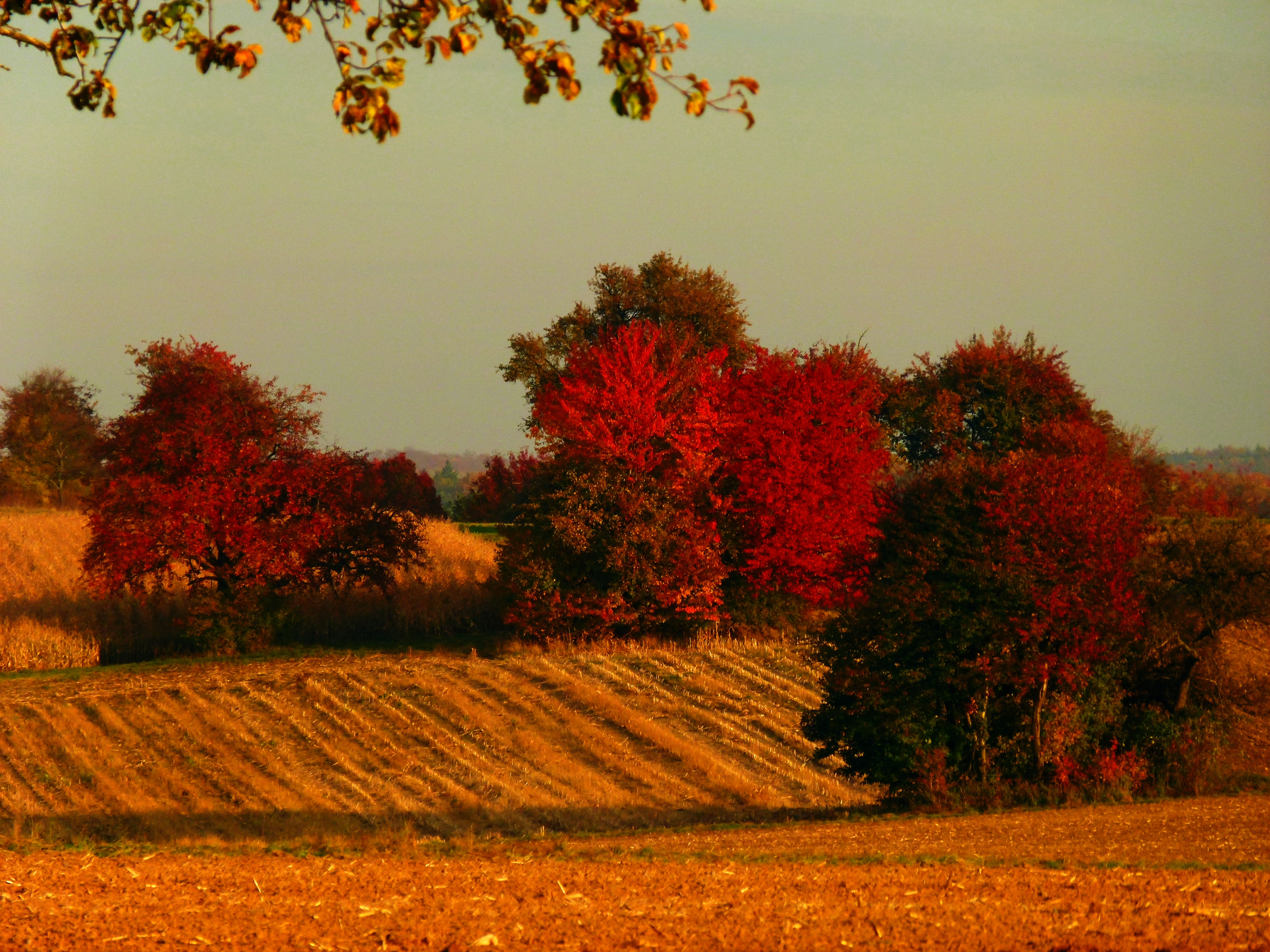
- Countryside near Kieselbronn

- Coat of arms

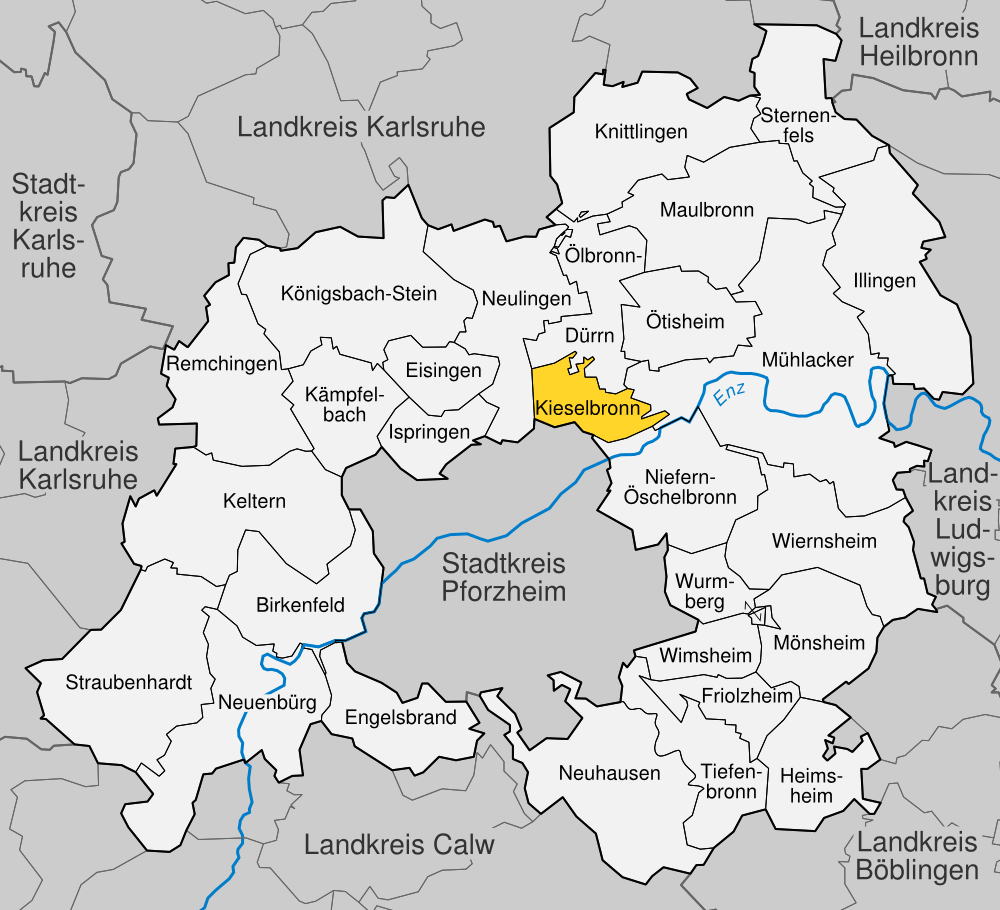
- Location of Kieselbronn within Enzkreis district
- Interactive map of Kieselbronn
- Location within Germany Location within Baden-Württemberg
- Coordinates: 48°56′0″N 8°44′55″E
- Country: Germany
- State: Baden-Württemberg
- Admin. region: Karlsruhe
- District: Enzkreis

Area
  - Total: 8.63 km^{2} (3.33 sq mi)
- Elevation: 346 m (1,135 ft)

Population (2025-12-31)
  - Total: 2,904
  - Density: 337/km^{2} (872/sq mi)
- Time zone: UTC+01:00 (CET)
  - Summer (DST): UTC+02:00 (CEST)
- Postal codes: 75249
- Dialling codes: 07231
- Vehicle registration: PF
- Website: www.kieselbronn.de

Kieselbronn is a municipality in the Enz district, in Baden-Württemberg.

== History ==
Kieselbronn was sold in 1368 to Maulbronn Monastery, which itself became a possession of the Duchy of Württemberg in 1504. The town was assigned to Oberamt Maulbronn in 1806, following German mediatization, but was ceded to the Grand Duchy of Baden in 1810 in the Baden-Württemberg Border Treaty of 1810. Kieselbronn was assigned to the Pforzheim district in 1819 and remained as such when Baden was reorganized in 1864 and on 25 June 1939. On 1 January 1973, was assigned to Enz district.

== Geography ==
The municipality (Gemeinde) of Kieselbronn is located in the Enz district, within the state of Baden-Württemberg and Federal Republic of Germany. The municipal area covers 8.63 square kilometers (3.33 sq mi). It is situated in the Kraichgau region, whose geology is made up largely of muschelkalk partially overlaid with loess, and sits above the Lettenkeuper Formation. The primary source of water in the municipal area is the Schlupfgraben, a tributary of the Enz that flows through the municipality from north to east. The center of the town of Kieselbronn is the highest point in the municipality at 369 meters (1,211 ft). The lowest elevation is 261 meters (856 ft) at the border with the municipality of Mühlacker.

== Coat of arms ==
Kieselbronn's coat of arms depicts a golden duck's foot upon a field of red. The duck foot is a municipal motif that dates back to 1704 and began appearing on local boundary stones and seals at the end of the 18th century. The Baden State Archives gave the coat of arms its red and gold coloring in 1907 to match the coat of arms for the Grand Duchy of Baden.
