= Eisingen =

German municipality

- Municipality
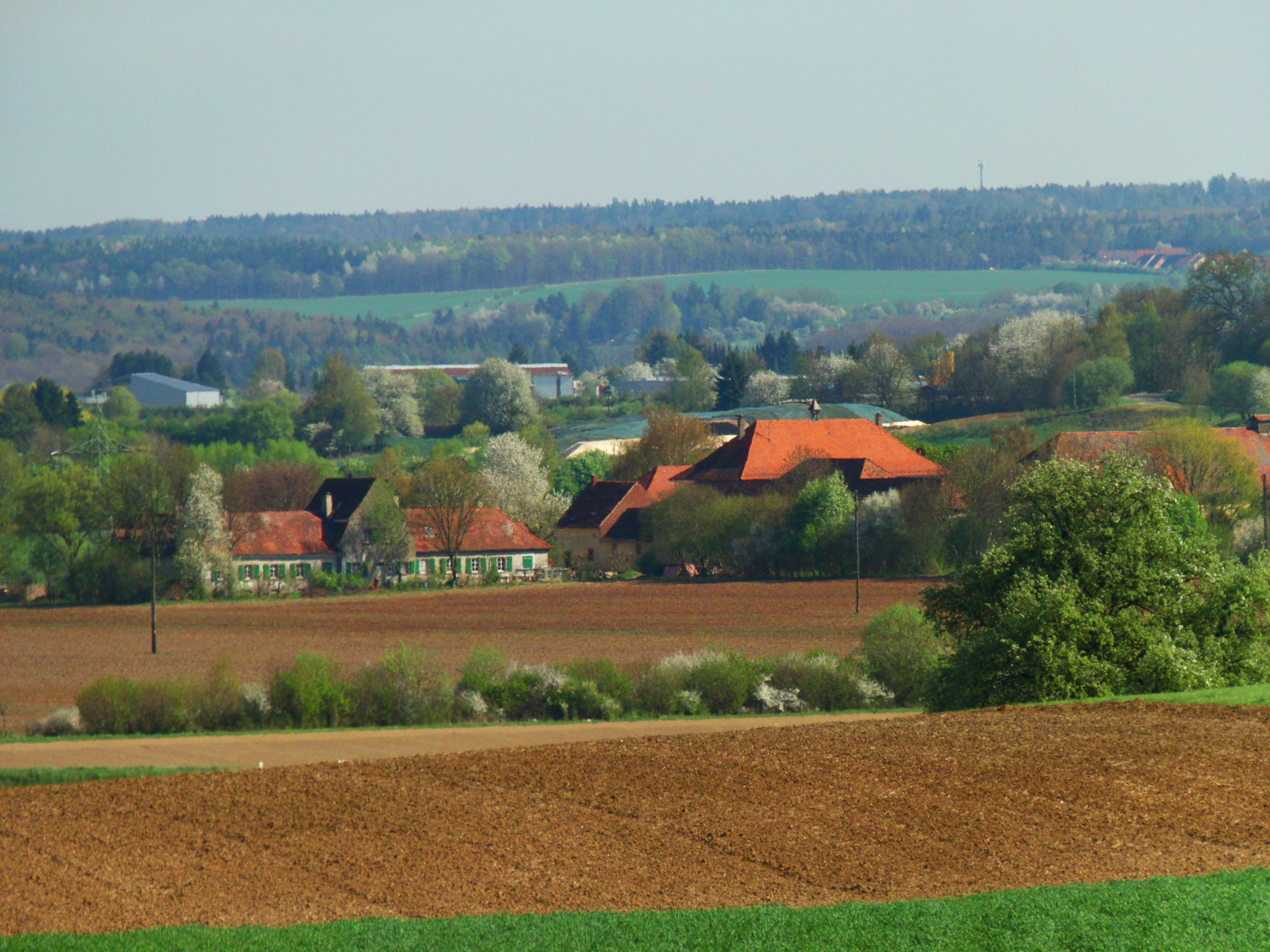
- The Katharinentalerhof, Eisingen

- Coat of arms

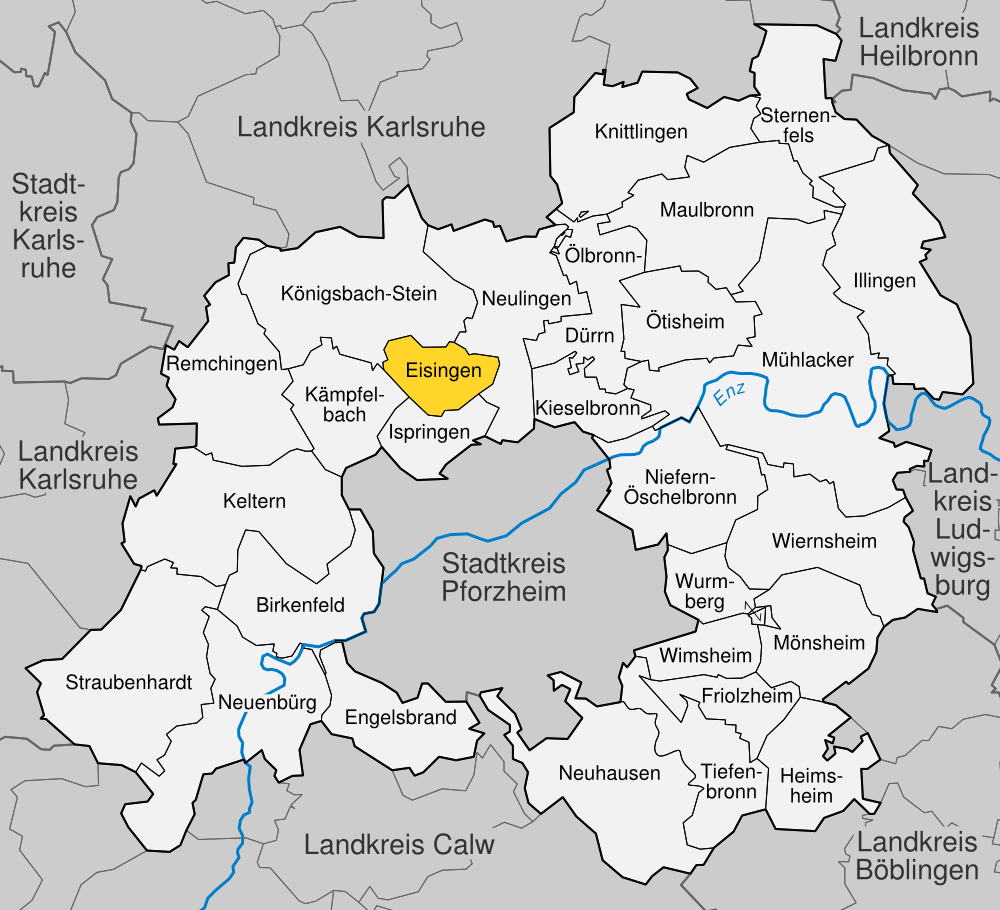
- Location of Eisingen within Enzkreis district
- Interactive map of Eisingen
- Location within Germany Location within Baden-Württemberg
- Coordinates: 48°56′51″N 08°40′07″E
- Country: Germany
- State: Baden-Württemberg
- Admin. region: Karlsruhe
- District: Enzkreis

Government
  - Mayor (2021–29): Sascha-Felipe Hottinger

Area
  - Total: 8.04 km^{2} (3.10 sq mi)
- Elevation: 306 m (1,004 ft)

Population (2025-12-31)
  - Total: 4,677
  - Density: 582/km^{2} (1,510/sq mi)
- Time zone: UTC+01:00 (CET)
  - Summer (DST): UTC+02:00 (CEST)
- Postal codes: 75237–75239
- Dialling codes: 07232
- Vehicle registration: PF
- Website: www.eisingen-enzkreis.de

Eisingen (German pronunciation: [ˈaɪzɪŋən]) is a municipality in the district of Enz in Baden-Württemberg in Germany. It is situated on the Bertha Benz Memorial Route and contains no other villages.

== History ==
Eisingen became a possession of the Margraviate of Baden in late 1495. It was governed by the district of Pforzheim until 1803, when it was reassigned to the district of Stein. Stein's district was dissolved on 25 May 1821 and Eisingen returned to Pforzheim's jurisdiction. On 25 June 1939 the district was reorganized as the Landkreis Pforzheim.

On 1 March 1985, the Eisinger Gäulandschaft Federally-protected nature preserve was created and is mostly located inside Eisingen.

== Geography ==
The municipality (Gemeinde) of Eisingen covers 8.04 square kilometers (3.10 mi^{2}) of the Enz district of the state of Baden-Württemberg and the Federal Republic of Germany. It is physically located on the Pfinzhügelland, on the southern reaches of the Kraichgau. The primary watercourse in Eisingen is the Gennenbach, a tributary of the Kämpfelbach. The lowest elevation above sea level in the municipal area is 207 meters (679 ft) Normalnull (NN) at the Untere Herrschaftswiesen. The highest elevation is the top of the Heidenkeller, at 360 meters (1,180 ft) NN.

== Politics ==
In the Baden-Württemberg local elections of 2014, Eisingen had a voter turnout of 47.2% (compared to 50.6% in 2009) that bought the Eisingen Free Voter's Association eight seats with 55.15% of the vote and the CDU six seats with the remainder. The mayor, Roland Bauer since December 2013, is entitled to a vote on the municipal council.

=== Coat of arms ===
Eisingen's municipal coat of arms depicts a plowshare in gold above a silver-bladed billhook on a field of red. The plowshare and the billhook reference town's history of viticulture, and were used on local boundary stones. The first municipal coat of arms was granted by the Margraves of Baden in 1497 and featured a plowshare and a billhook. The present pattern was adopted in 1902 with the tincture of the Grand Duchy of Baden on the suggestion of the Karlsruhe State Archive.
