= Wimsheim =

German municipality

- Municipality
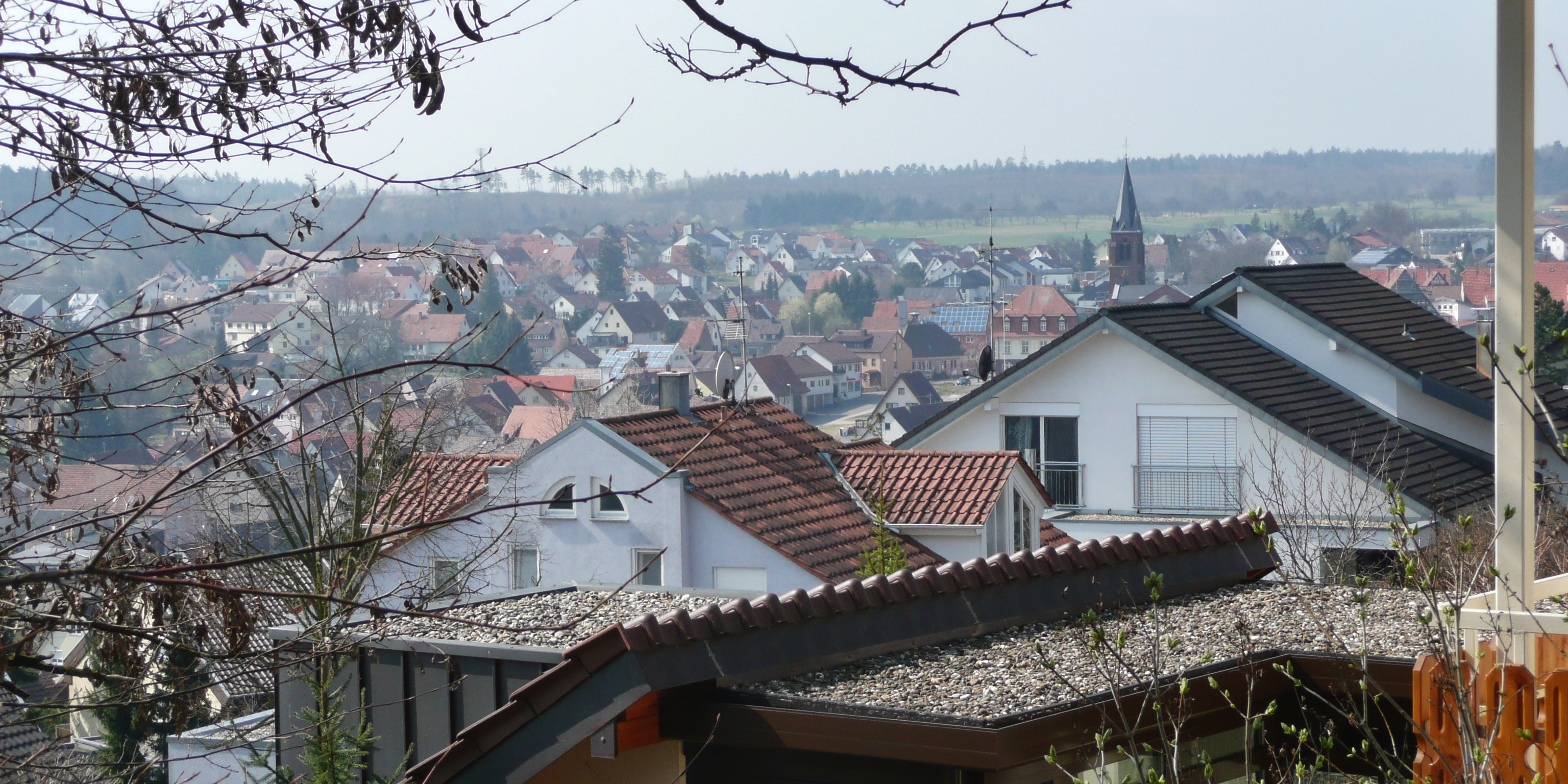
- Wimsheim

- Coat of arms

- Location of Wimsheim within Enzkreis district
- Interactive map of Wimsheim
- Location within Germany Location within Baden-Württemberg
- Coordinates: 48°51′9″N 8°49′37″E
- Country: Germany
- State: Baden-Württemberg
- Admin. region: Karlsruhe
- District: Enzkreis

Area
  - Total: 8.06 km^{2} (3.11 sq mi)
- Elevation: 415 m (1,362 ft)

Population (2025-12-31)
  - Total: 2,862
  - Density: 355/km^{2} (920/sq mi)
- Time zone: UTC+01:00 (CET)
  - Summer (DST): UTC+02:00 (CEST)
- Postal codes: 71299
- Dialling codes: 07044
- Vehicle registration: PF
- Website: www.wimsheim.de

Wimsheim (German pronunciation: [ˈvɪmshaɪm]) is a municipality in the Enz district of Baden-Württemberg, Germany.

== History ==
Wimsheim became a possession of Maulbronn Monastery in 1232. When the monastery was annexed by the Duchy of Württemberg, Wimsheim naturally became a possession of the Duke of Württemberg. The town continued to be governed from Maulbronn via an administrative district, made an Oberamt on 18 March 1806, until the district's dissolution on 1 October 1938. As part of that reorganization, Wimsheim was assigned to Landkreis Leonberg. On 1 January 1973, this district too was dissolved by the 1973 Baden-Württemberg district reform, and Wimsheim was again reassigned, this time to the newly created Enz district.

In 1941, 16 hectares (40 acres) of land along Bundesautobahn 5 was made a protected landscape.

== Geography ==
The municipality (Gemeinde) of Wimsheim covers 8.06 square kilometers (3.11 sq mi) of the Enz district of Baden-Württemberg, a state of the Federal Republic of Germany. Wimsheim is located in the metropolitan areas of Pforzheim and Karlsruhe and on the edge of the Black Forest, the Neckar basin, and the Heckengäu. The geology of the municipal area is made up of two distinct regions. The west is described by the Heckengäu's wooded and karstified muschelkalk hills, while the east is made up by Black Forest buntsandstein. Elevation above sea level in the municipality ranges from a low of 380 meters (1,250 ft) Normalnull (NN) on the Grenzbach to a high of 296 meters (971 ft) NN in the Brenntenhau.

== Coat of arms ==
Wimsheim's coat of arms shows a golden trammel hook above a six-pointed star upon a field of blue. The oldest coat of arms associated with Wimsheim comes from the 19th century and was used by the office of its sheriff. The tincture was decided around 1947.
