= Heimsheim =

German town

- Town
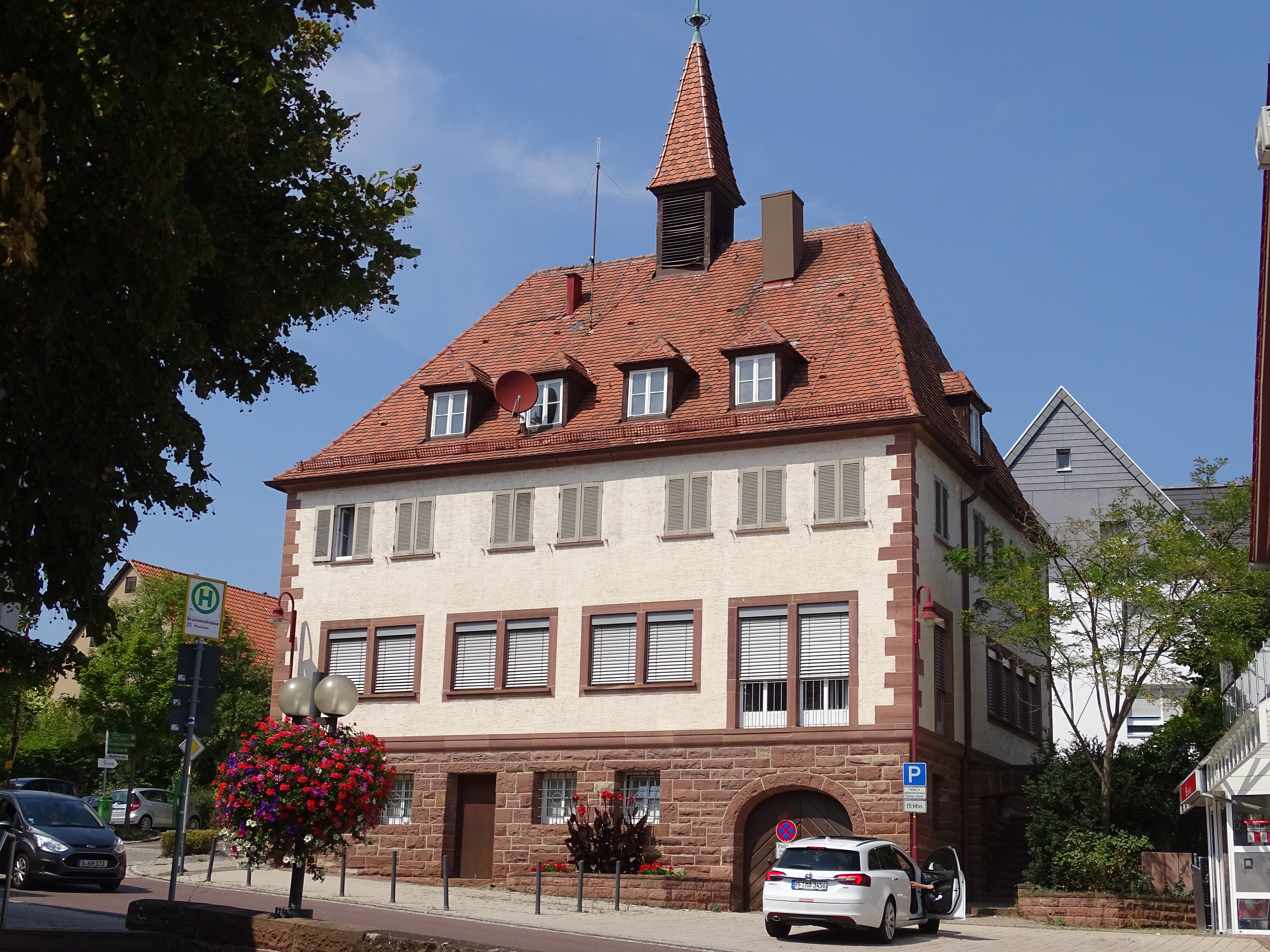
- Heimsheim's town hall

- Coat of arms

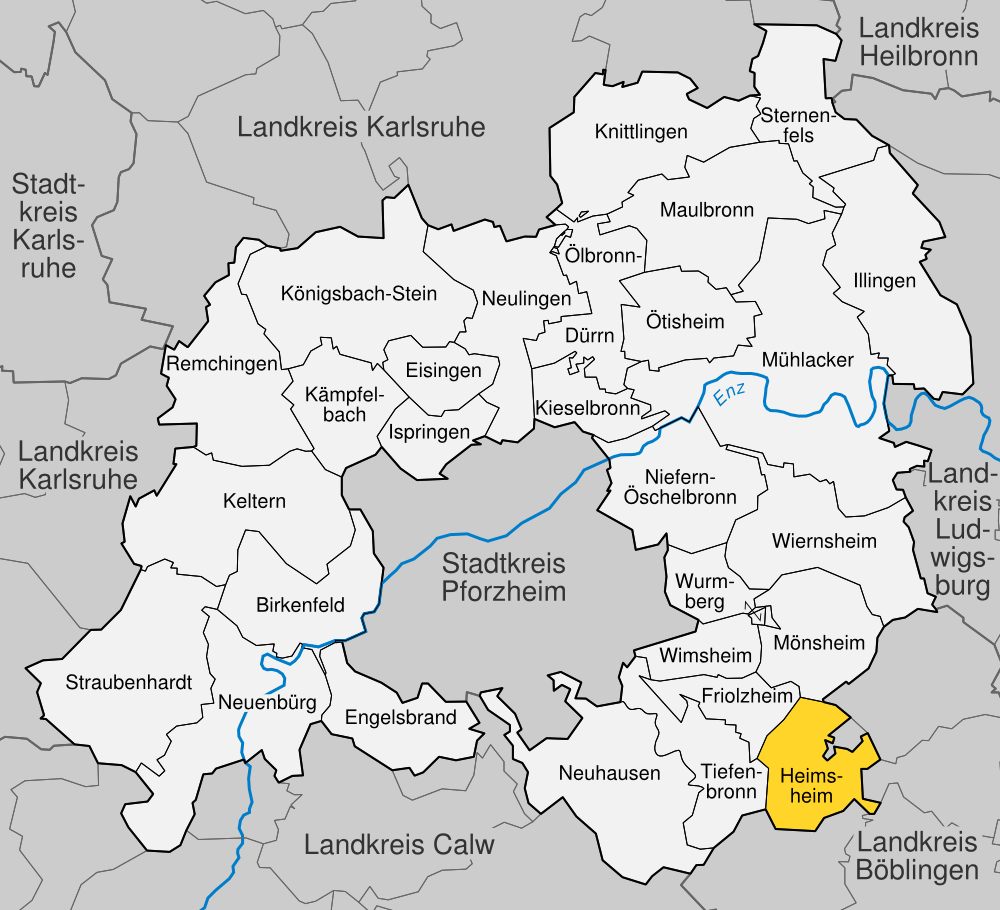
- Location of Heimsheim within Enzkreis district
- Interactive map of Heimsheim
- Location within Germany Location within Baden-Württemberg
- Coordinates: 48°48′20″N 8°51′43″E
- Country: Germany
- State: Baden-Württemberg
- Admin. region: Karlsruhe
- District: Enzkreis

Area
  - Total: 14.3 km^{2} (5.5 sq mi)
- Elevation: 413 m (1,355 ft)

Population (2025-12-31)
  - Total: 5,531
  - Density: 387/km^{2} (1,000/sq mi)
- Time zone: UTC+01:00 (CET)
  - Summer (DST): UTC+02:00 (CEST)
- Postal codes: 71296
- Dialling codes: 07033
- Vehicle registration: PF
- Website: www.heimsheim.de

Heimsheim (German pronunciation: [ˈhaɪmsˌhaɪm]) is a town in the Enz district, in Baden-Württemberg, Germany.

== History ==
Heimsheim was given the official status of a township by the County Palatine of Tübingen at the start of the 14th century. Early in the 16th century, the town came into the possession of the Duchy of Württemberg. Heimsheim was assigned to the district of Weil der Stadt in 1803, and then to Oberamt Leonberg in 1807–08. The town remained under Leonberg when the district was recreated on 1 October 1938. After World War II, the town became part of the Stuttgart Metropolitan Region and expanded to the north and east, in the direction of the Bundesautobahn 8. On 1 January 1973, Heimsheim was assigned to the Enz district.

== Geography ==
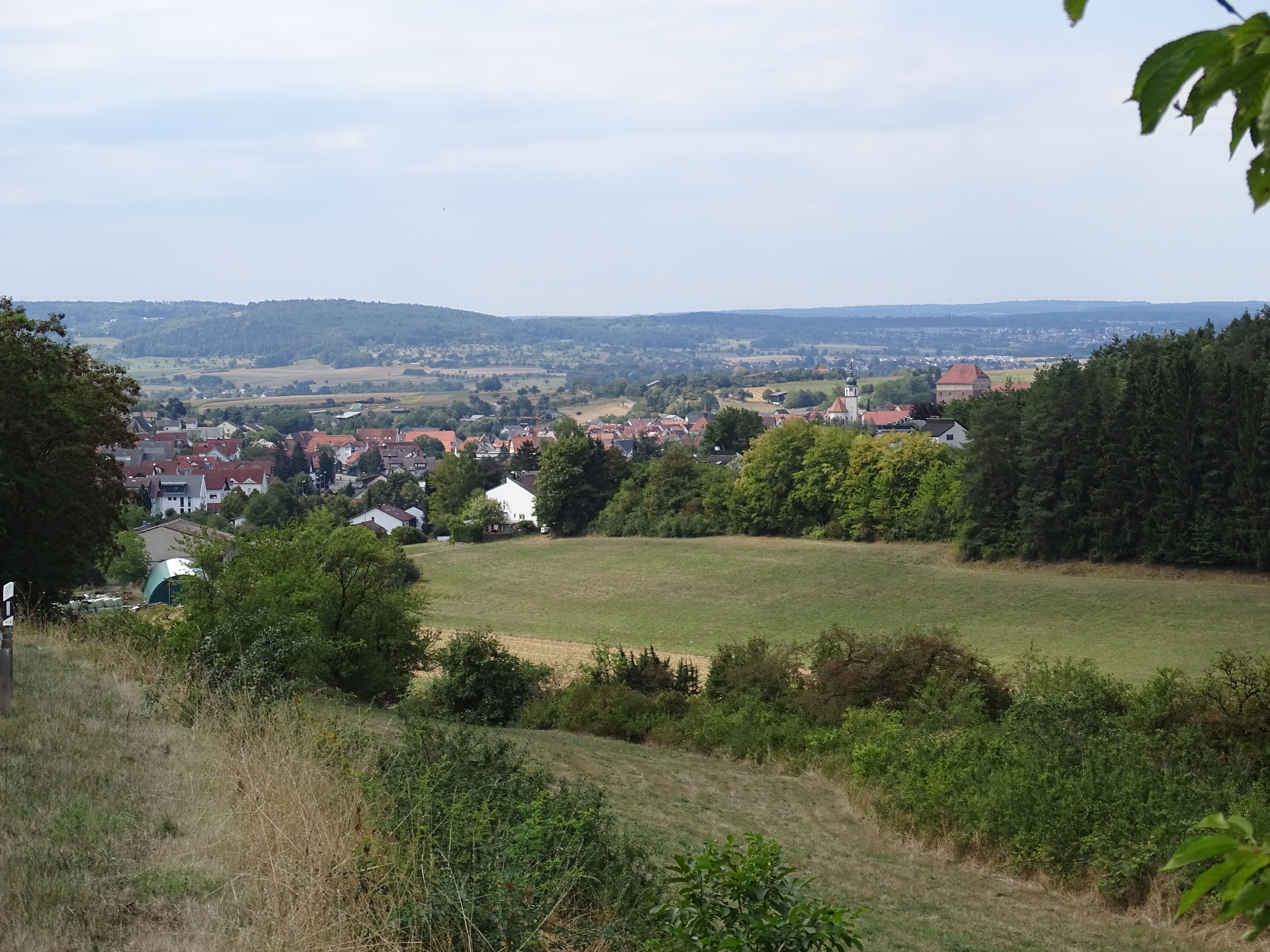
Heimsheim and the protected landscape

The township (Stadt) Heimsheim covers an area of 14.3 square kilometers (5.5 mi^{2}) at the very southeastern tip of the Enz district. It is physically located in the foothills of the Black Forest, in the Heckengäu, a region geology is characterized by karstified and wooded muschelkalk hills. Because the Heckengäu is home to a number of protected species of fauna, Heimsheim borders the Feuerbacher Heide-Dickenberg, Tiefenbronner Seewiesen, Silverberg nature reserve, and Betzenbuckel Federal nature reserves. The primary watercourse in Heimsheim is the Kotzenbach (also called the Zieselbach), which drains into the Würm to the southwest. The river flows through a shallow valley carved into the Upper Buntsandstein near Heimsheim's center, and along Enz district's western edge. The Kotzenbach is also the location of Heimsheim's lowest elevation, 392 meters (1,286 ft) NN. The highest elevation, 511 meters (1,677 ft), is the top of a hill on the border with Renningen, in the Böblingen district. The southwest portion of Heimsheim lies in the Upper Gäu while the northern and eastern portion is made up by Upper Muschelkalk and the west of Middle and Lower Muschelkalk.

== Politics ==
The local council has 14 members. Elections were held in 2014:

- FWV Freie Wählervereinigung (Free voters) 4 seats
- BfH Bürger für Heimsheim (Citizens for Heimsheim) 3 seats
- CDU 3 seats
- SPD 3 seats
- UWV Unabhängige Wählervereinigung (Independent voters association) 1 seat

=== Coat of arms ===
The coat of arms of Heimsheim depicts two golden ears of wheat upon an emerald field. This pattern dates back to 1456 and has been the most consistently used coat of arms used by the township. There have, however, been some variants used. From 1585 to 1902, a pattern that replaced the wheat with arrows was sometimes used, as was another with three ears of wheat. In 1596, a pattern of the coat of arms that replaced the emerald field with a yellow one was introduced. The original, default coat of arms was confirmed by the Federal Ministry of the Interior on 25 July 1966.
