= Niefern-Öschelbronn =

German municipality

- Municipality
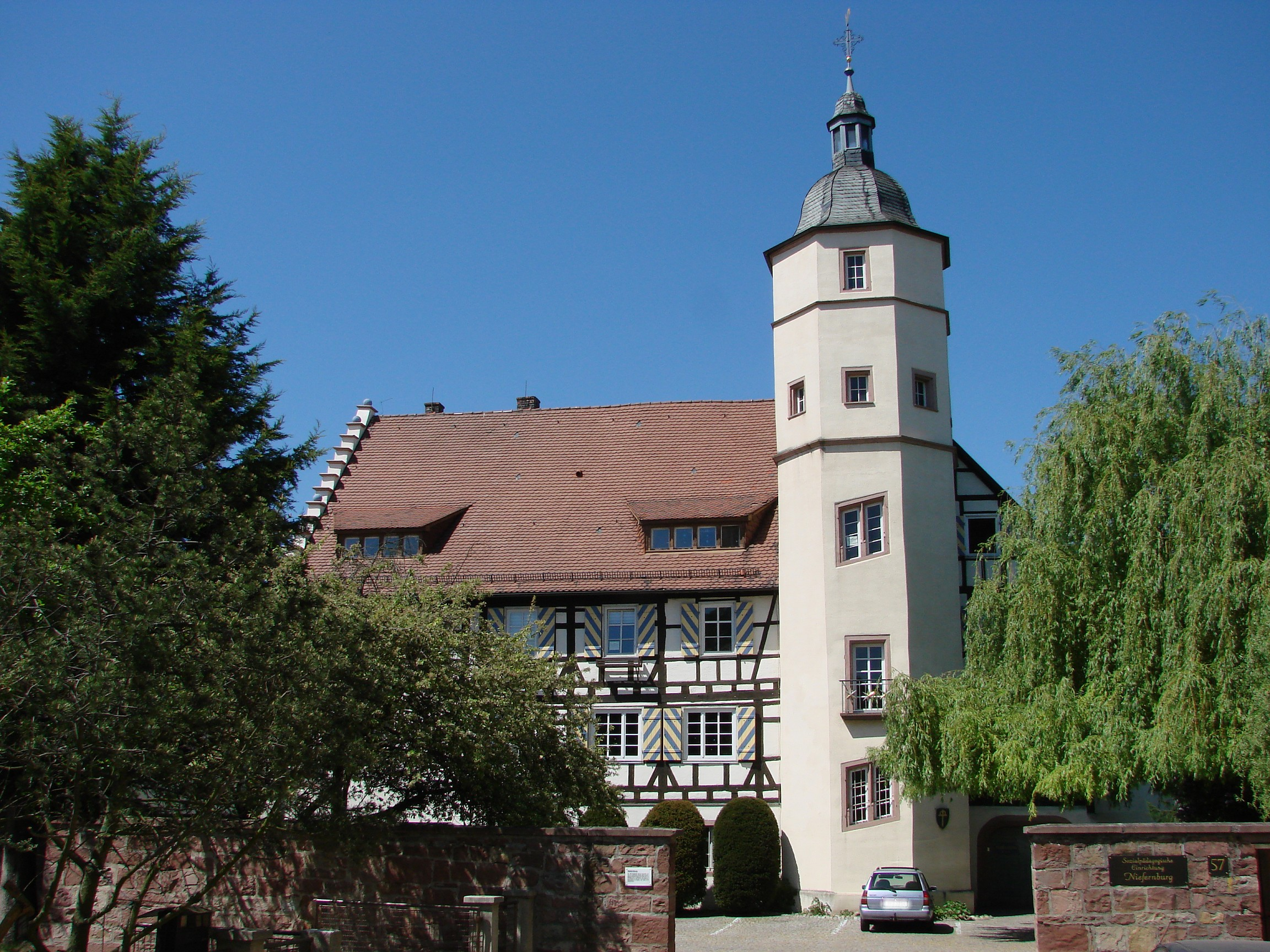
- Niefernburg

- Coat of arms

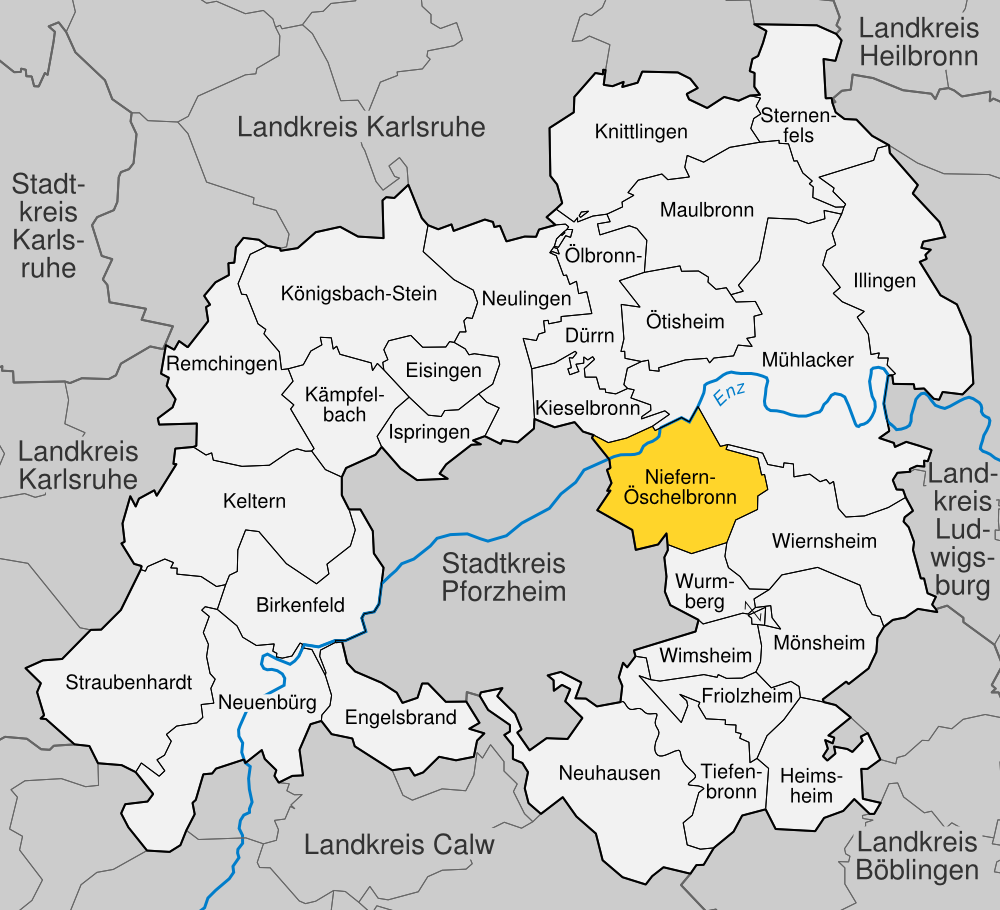
- Location of Niefern-Öschelbronn within Enzkreis district
- Interactive map of Niefern-Öschelbronn
- Location within Germany Location within Baden-Württemberg
- Coordinates: 48°54′59″N 8°47′3″E
- Country: Germany
- State: Baden-Württemberg
- Admin. region: Karlsruhe
- District: Enzkreis

Government
  - Mayor (2024–32): Uwe Engelsberger

Area
  - Total: 22.02 km^{2} (8.50 sq mi)
- Elevation: 240 m (790 ft)

Population (2025-12-31)
  - Total: 12,583
  - Density: 571.4/km^{2} (1,480/sq mi)
- Time zone: UTC+01:00 (CET)
  - Summer (DST): UTC+02:00 (CEST)
- Postal codes: 75223
- Dialling codes: 07233
- Vehicle registration: PF
- Website: www.niefern-oeschelbronn.de

Niefern-Öschelbronn is a municipality in the Enz district, in Baden-Württemberg, Germany. It is situated on the river Enz, 6 km east of Pforzheim.

== History ==
Öschelbronn had been a possession of the Duchy of Württemberg since 1504, while Niefern was a possession of the Margraviate of Baden from 1529. Öschelbronn was ceded to Baden in an 1810 exchange of territories between the now Kingdom of Württemberg and Grand Duchy of Baden, and it and Niefern were assigned to the district of Pforzheim. The two towns remained under the jurisdiction of Pforzheim through the reorganizations of 1819 and 1 October 1864, and again when the district was reorganized on 25 June 1939 as Landkreis Pforzheim. On 1 August 1971, Öschelbronn was incorporated into Niefern, which changed its name to Niefern-Öschelbronn on 18 November 1971. The new municipality was assigned on 1 January 1973 to the Enz district by the 1973 Baden-Württemberg district reform.

== Geography ==
The municipality (Gemeinde) of Niefern-Öschelbronn covers an area of 22.02 square kilometers (8.50 mi^{2}) of the Enz district, within the state of Baden-Württemberg and the Federal Republic of Germany. Physically, the municipality is located where the buntsandstein of the Black Forest meets the muschelkalk plateaus of the Neckar basin. The primary watercourse is the Enz, whose wide valley makes up the northern area of the municipality. The banks of the Enz are the site of the lowest elevation above sea water in the municipality at 226 meters (741 ft) Normalnull (NN). The highest elevation, 431 meters (1,414 ft) NN, is the Steinbuckel, in the south of the municipality.

== Demographics ==
Population development:

Year	Inhabitants
1970	8,911
1987	9,530
2011	11,755

== Coat of arms ==
Niefern-Öschelbronn's municipal coat of arms is a combination of Niefern and Öschelbronn's coats of arms and their tinctures. It depicts a golden fountain with silver waters and three gold six-pointed stars upon a field of blue. The image of a fountain had been in Öschelbronn's seals as early as 1755. The three stars, of Niefern, were taken from the coat of arms of Martin Achtsynit, Chancellor of Charles II, Margrave of Baden-Durlach, who had a castle in the town. The municipal coat of arms was approved by the Federal Ministry of the Interior on 31 July 1972.

== See also ==
- Official website (in German)
- Krankenhaus (in German)
- Wirtschaftlich stärkstes Unternehmen (in German)
- Zentrum für Lebensgestaltung im Alter (in German)
