= Sternenfels =

- Municipality
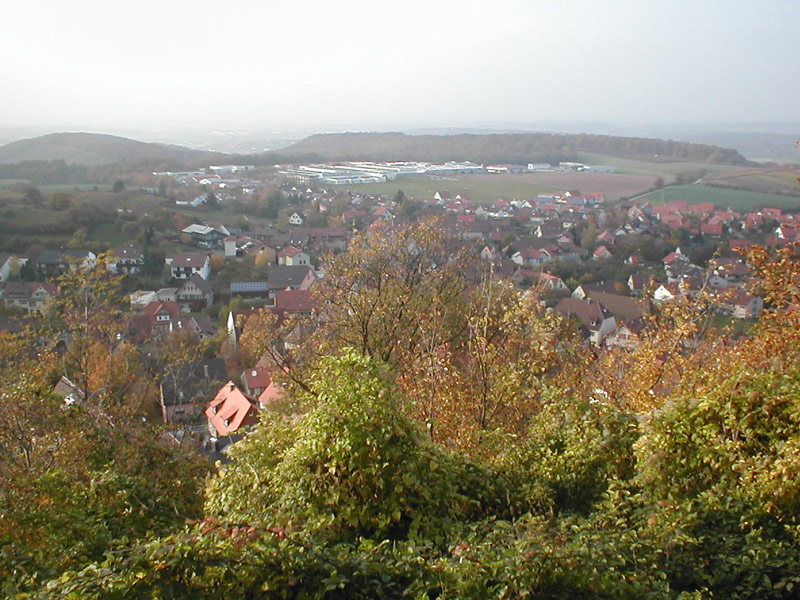
- Sternenfels perspective from the Castle hill

- Coat of arms

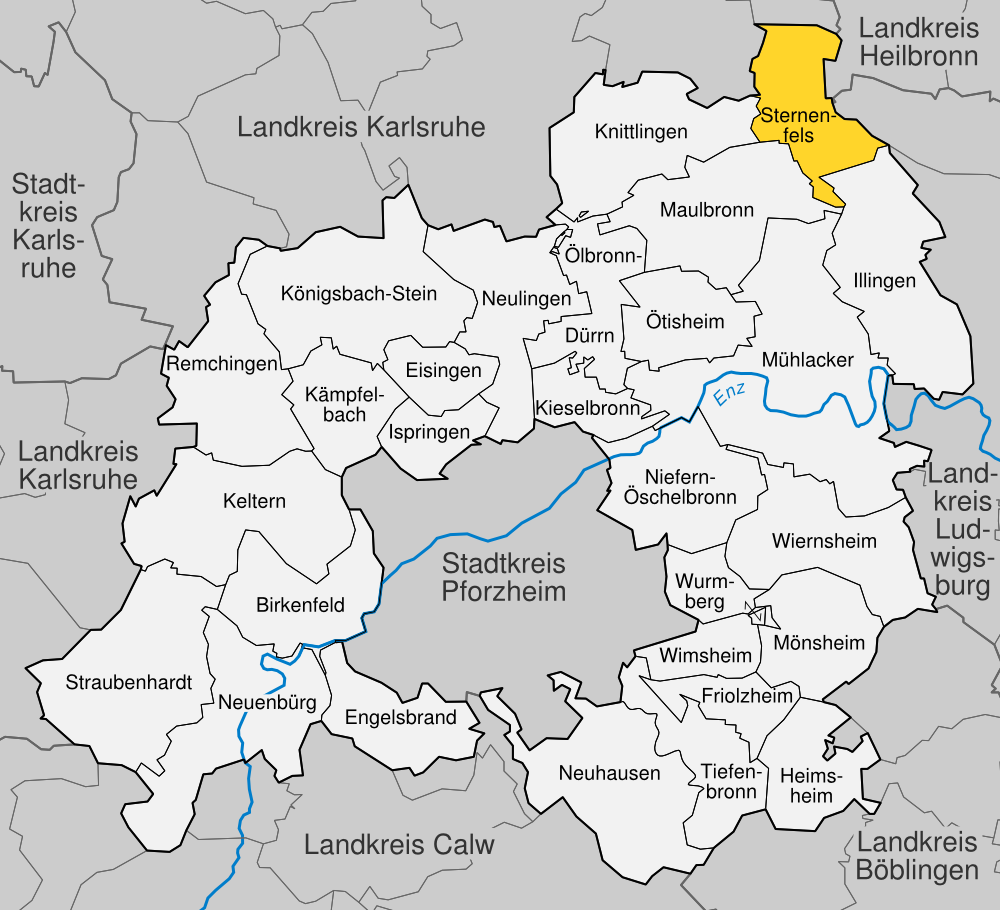
- Location of Sternenfels within Enzkreis district
- Interactive map of Sternenfels
- Location within Germany Location within Baden-Württemberg
- Coordinates: 49°3′1″N 8°51′02″E
- Country: Germany
- State: Baden-Württemberg
- Admin. region: Karlsruhe
- District: Enzkreis

Area
  - Total: 17.32 km^{2} (6.69 sq mi)
- Elevation: 397 m (1,302 ft)

Population (2025-12-31)
  - Total: 2,797
  - Density: 161.5/km^{2} (418.3/sq mi)
- Time zone: UTC+01:00 (CET)
  - Summer (DST): UTC+02:00 (CEST)
- Postal codes: 75447
- Dialling codes: 07045
- Vehicle registration: PF
- Website: www.sternenfels.org

Sternenfels, consisting of the villages of Diefenbach and Sternenfels, is the most northern municipality in the Enzkreis (district) in Baden-Württemberg in Germany. The town is located at the border of the Kraichgau and Stromberg regions. Sternenfels is considered a showcase village and was mentioned in several national and European studies and competitions. It is about 20 km from Pforzheim and close to the UNESCO world heritage site of Maulbronn.

== Role as showcase village ==
Sternenfels (Translation: star rock—a meaning which inspired the town coat of arms) has a peculiar location and citizens. The town has a very active community with more than 25 different associations; from different choruses, brass bands, a roaming pigeon club, a German Turkish council, a tourist board, various sport associations, political parties, winemaker and farmer associations. In addition, the town website has been awarded for it is a very active web community. The village has received several prizes in national competitions for renovation projects, beauty and sustainability.

Sternenfels has been the subject of several studies, dealing with regional and rural planning and sustainable development, as well as remote work and rural industrial development

Sternenfels has been used as a Baden-Württemberg showcase village at EXPO 2000 and various other congresses and conferences. The expo participation is manifested in a monument on the main road.

== Geography and climate ==
Precipitation in Sternenfels.

Sternenfels is located on an exposed western spur of the east-west running Stromberg hills. The watershed between Rhine and Neckar rivers as well as the border between Kraichgau and Stromberg passes near Sternenfels. The Village of Diefenbach is the site of the Metter spring which runs via the Enz River to the Neckar, while the Kraich spring in Sternenfels ends in the Rhine river. Sternenfels is at the crossroads of four different counties - (Karlsruhe, Heilbronn, Ludwigsburg und Enzkreis). It is the starting or end point for several hiking or walking trails as well as part of Württemberg Wine route from Weikersheim to Metzingen. The former Roman road between Stettfeld and Bad Cannstatt probably crossed Sternenfels. The municipality became a local tourist destination with several inns and (former) breweries located around the town center.

The climate of Sternenfels is generally mild due to the influence of the neighboring Kraichgau hills. The castle hill, with a height of about 400 m (1,300 ft), allows portions of Sternenfels to overlook the neighboring Kraichgau. The major rain storms generally happen earlier in the year than in the rest of the region, though this helps the local vineyards. Generally the local soil is comparatively poor and is mainly used for forestry.

== Transportation ==
Public Transport is provided by several bus lines. The closest train connection are the Karlsruhe Tram Train system in neighboring Flehingen. A revival of the Zabergäu Railway is under planning.

== History ==
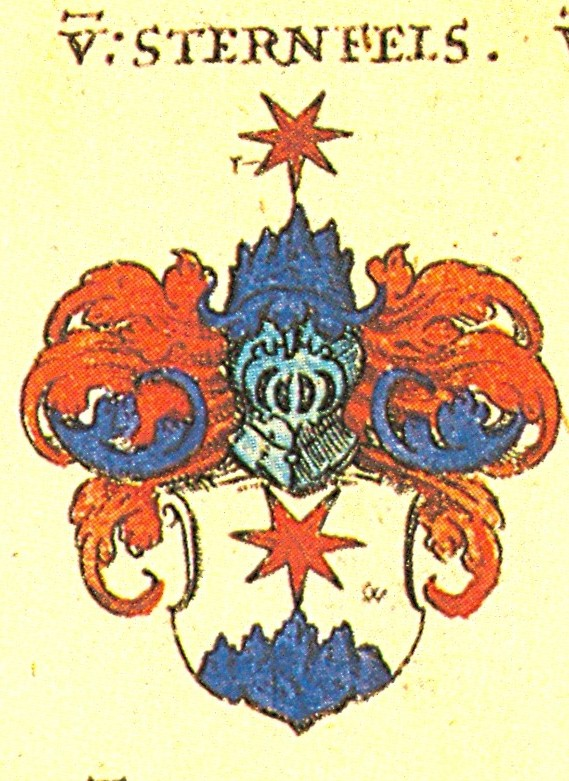
Coat of Arms of von Sternenfels noble family, in Johann Siebmacher's book of coat of arms (Wappenbuch).

The former Sternenfels castle was probably founded at the start of the 11th century by the von Sternenfels family. In 1232, Sternenfels community was mentioned in a deed the first time, since the community has been destroyed and resettled several times, e.g. in the Thirty Years' War, it did not develop into a bigger settlement. However the peculiar site and a vibrant community life make Sternenfels till today an outstanding municipality. During the 14th century, Sternenfels became part of Württemberg. The Thirty Years' War left the village in shambles. Immigrants from Switzerland repopulated the area and 'Schweitzer' is still an important local family name. Near the end of the 17th century, some of the Eppingen Line fortifications were built around and integrated Sternenfels. These fortifications are still visible. The Protestant parish church in Sternenfels was built in the 18th century, the Diefenbach church 1621 according plans of Heinrich Schickhardt.

Sternenfels was the main site of the Sternenfels noble family. Derived from high German nobility they were related with the Herren von Kürnbach and mentioned as early as the 12th century. A Cunradus liber de Sterrenvils took over the realm of Kürnbach as well. 1252 two sons of Cunradus, Cunradus und Wernherus nobiles de Sternvels joined the fatal last voyage of Conradin to Italy.

== Geology and local industry ==
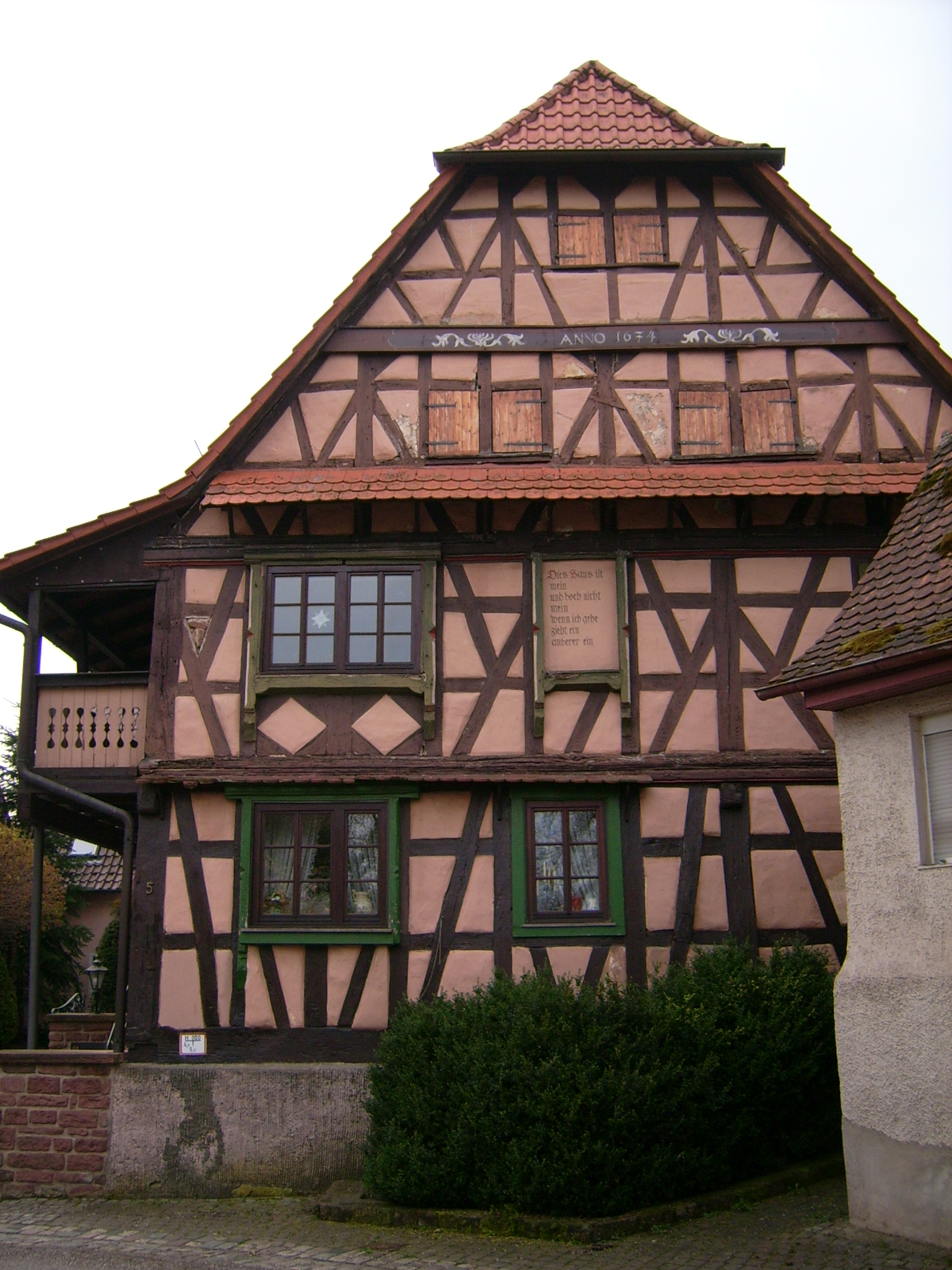
Wooden framework house of 1674 in Diefenbach.

Sternenfels has a long industrial history. The local quarries were used to produce masonry and "stubensand", an early abrasive which was very popular for household cleaning in the 18th and 19th centuries. The town castle, built by the von Kürnbach family and later used by the von Sternenfels, was completely demolished and used to produce stubensand by 1778. In 1866 an observation tower was built and triggered local tourism. Sternenfels image was coined by the "sandbauern", farmers that produced stubensand and wove baskets besides farming. The intensive stubensand production led to damages in the local forests and ongoing conflicts between the community and the sandbauern, which were entitled to excavate stubensandstone in the local forests. The last sand mill was closed in 1935, however sandbauern costumes are still worn sometimes and the sandbauern image is used to promote the village. The site of the castle is still visible in the center of the village. The 14 m high Water tower on the former castle hill was built during 1967 as part of the Lake of Constance Water supply system and styled as a keep. The tower is open for the public and allows an excellent view both over Kraichgau and Stromberg. It includes as well an historic exhibition about the local nobility and geology.

The Late Triassic Stuben Sandstone formation (German: Stubensandstein, the source of Stubensand) around Sternenfels contains as well small amounts of gold. Christopher Bechtler—a citizen and jeweler of Pforzheim—demonstrated a gold sluice, he had invented. The two-day trial caused major public attraction since Bechtler invited the farmers to have huge amount of stubensand washed. Bechtler was not very successful in Sternenfels but later became a millionaire in the United States— Bechtler invented and coined the first Gold dollars.

Sternenfels has attracted several companies in electronics, mechanical instruments and machinery and is still an industrial village. After World War I, a local tobacco and cigar manufacturer played an important role in the local job market. As well the Schweitzer factory, an industrial complex founded around 1900 producing measurement devices provided over hundred work places but closed down 1995. The site was converted in an innovation center allowing small companies sharing basic facilities and as well teleworking work places.

== Local politics ==
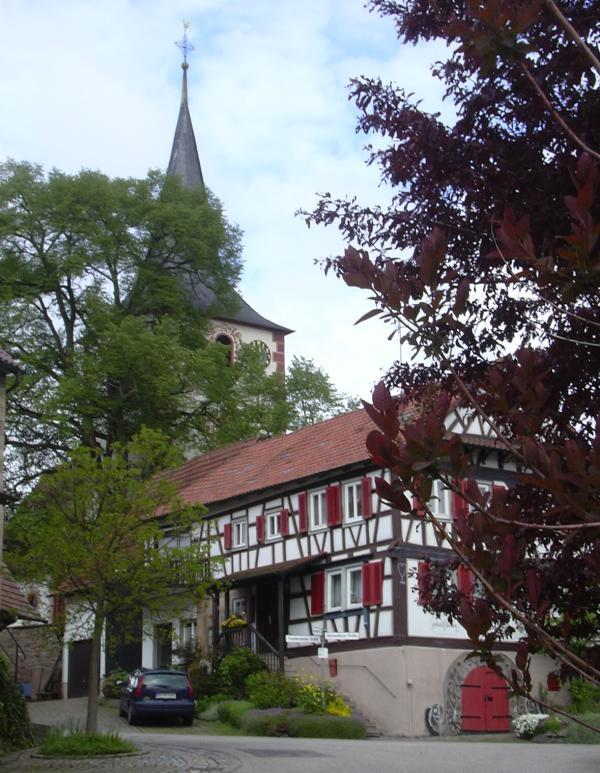
Diefenbach center.

The Sternenfels Workers Guild founded 1875 was one of the first social democratic local organizations in the German southwest. Bismarcks Anti-Socialist Laws and as well Sternenfels reputation as a "red village" during the Nazi regime made the villagers evade into non political associations as the Volkschor (people chorus) and the Badverein (water park pool association).

During the last free elections to the German Reichstag 1932 the SPD reached 33.7%, the communist party 45% and NSDAP 15.2%. However a common list of SPD and KPD was never achieved. The SPD in Sternenfels tried as early as 1922 to reach out to local farmers and artisans. The first free elections after the war 1947 gave the SPD 4 of 12 seats in the city council, KPD 3 and free voters 5 seats.

The local elections on 13 June 2004 lead to the following results :

SPD	52.4%	+5.5	6 Seats	±0
FWG	47.6%	-5.5	6 Seats	±0

The election of the mayor is not done by the magistrate but according to Gemeindeordnung in southern Germany via a direct election. From 1974 til 2006 Helmut Wagner was mayor. Since 2006 Sigrid Hornauer, the first female mayor, is in office.

For the pragmatic Sternenfels way, a touch of suebian avarity, pietist pragmatism, and sense of community is the setup of the municipal hall close to Freibad, Kraich fountain, Kindergarten and cemetery. The modern architecture of the multipurpose hall is used for sports, local events and—via a separate entry to the cemetery—to convene for burial services. The neighboring parish center, built in the 1980s, is named after the pietist preacher and 19th-century labour delegate Christoph Blumhardt.

== Sister cities ==
Sternenfels has a partnership with Nöbdenitz in Thuringia.

== Culture and local activities ==
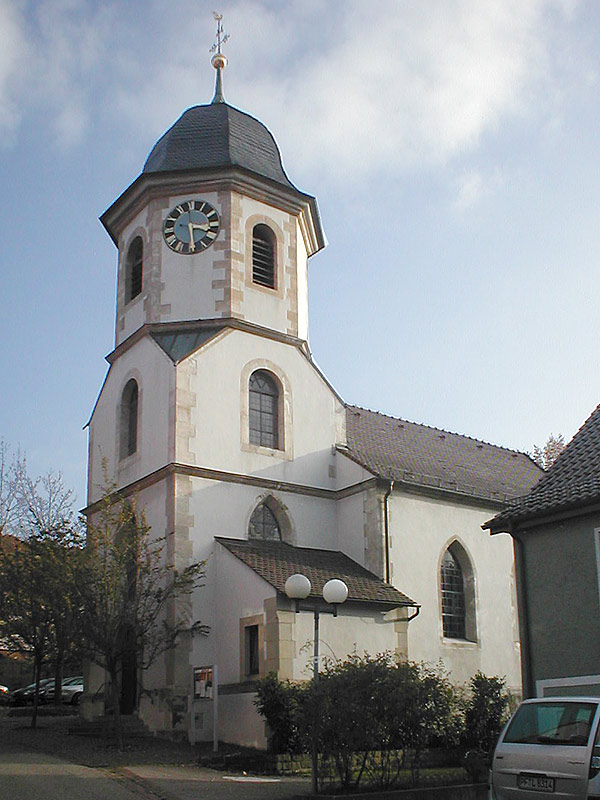
Protestant parish church of Sternenfels.

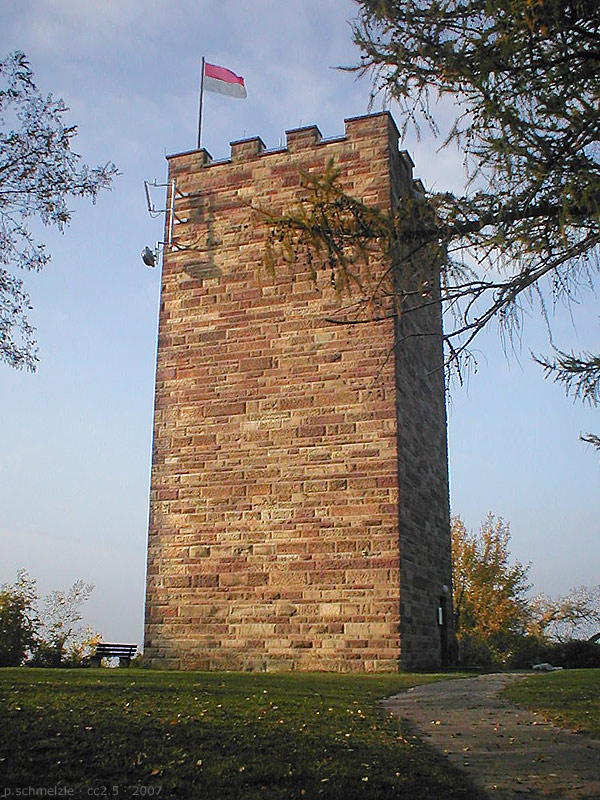
Sternenfels water storage.

Sternenfels has a variety of local associations. The most important is the Sternenfels Freibadverein (Pool association) with more than 600 members. The Badverein takes care of Sternenfels' local water park, the "Freibad". The first pool was built 1939 and the whole site completely renovated 1969. It is a very peculiar institution in a village of less than 3,000 inhabitants and it is said to be among the most beautiful public swimming pools in the area. The pool guards, ticket sales, concerts and night activities and a recently installed beach volley field are managed on a non commercial base.

Sternenfels has attracted some painters and photographers living and working in the village. Kräuterhexe (herbology witch) Gabriele Bickels lives in Sternenfels and provides training courses and field tours in herbology.

Diefenbach has a separate community house hosting various exhibitions and a permanent exhibition about fire fighting and fire pump systems, the earliest one of 1808. The local fire fighter brigade still plays a part in the community life.

=== Education ===
Besides a municipal kindergarten and a state primary school, the Freie Schule Diefenbach provides primary to middle education based on Rudolf Steiners Waldorf education.

== Personalities ==
- Theodor Schweitzer (1875–1953), local industrialist, founder of Theodor Schweitzer company
- Franz Walter Stahlecker (1900–1942), Nazi mass murderer, born in Sternenfels (he moved away in 1903)
- Rudolf Stahlecker (1898–1977), brother of Franz Walter Stahlecker, German geologist and biology teacher, collected fossils in Brazil and Argentina.
- Friedrich Veit (1871–1913), linguist
- Horst Krautter (1932–1996), administrative expert and peace movement activist
