= Enzkreis =

Coordinates: 48.9°N 8.75°E

Enz
- District
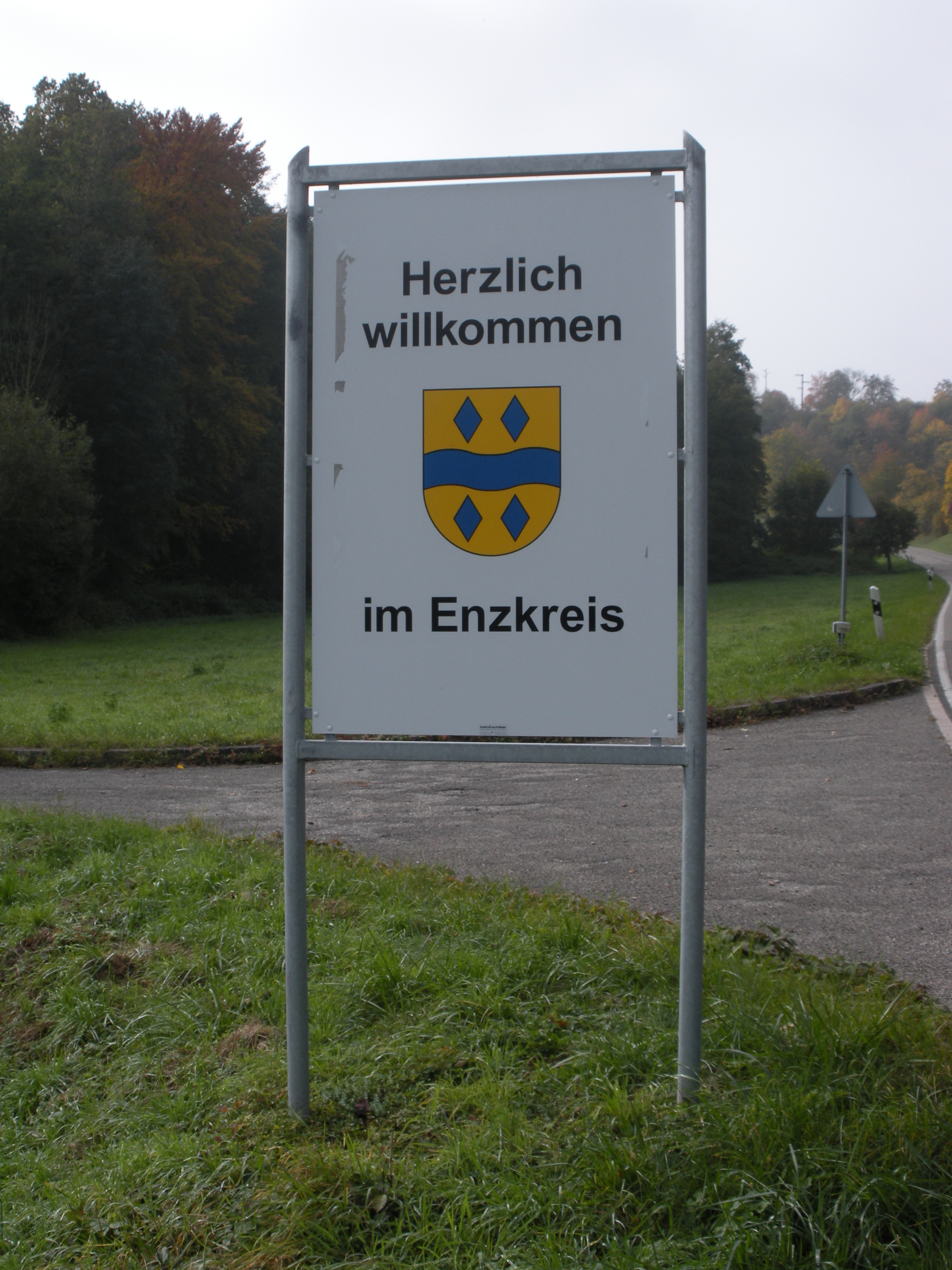
- Welcome sign

- Flag Coat of arms
- Country: Germany
- State: Baden-Württemberg
- Adm. region: Karlsruhe
- Capital: Pforzheim

Government
  - District admin.: Bastian Rosenau

Area
  - Total: 573.92 km^{2} (221.59 sq mi)

Population (31 December 2024)
  - Total: 199,745
  - Density: 348.04/km^{2} (901.41/sq mi)
- Time zone: UTC+01:00 (CET)
  - Summer (DST): UTC+02:00 (CEST)
- Vehicle registration: PF
- Website: www.enzkreis.de

Enzkreis (German pronunciation: [ˈɛntskʁaɪs], Enz district) is a Landkreis (district) in the northwest of Baden-Württemberg, Germany. Neighboring districts are (from west clockwise) Karlsruhe, Heilbronn, Ludwigsburg, Böblingen and Calw. The district-free Pforzheim area in the south is nearly completely surrounded by Enz.

== History ==
The district was created in 1973, when the previous district Pforzheim was merged with parts of the neighboring districts Vaihingen, Leonberg and Calw. Some part of the district Pforzheim was included into the city Pforzheim.

The district Pforzheim dates back to 1939, when the Bezirksamt Pforzheim was split into the district and the district-free city.

== Geography ==
The south of the Enzkreis covers the northern part of the Black Forest. In the north-west of the district is the Kraichgau, a mainly agricultural area. The main river is the Enz, a tributary of the Neckar.

== International relations ==
=== Twin towns — Sister cities ===
Since March 1993, the district has an official partnership with the Italian province Reggio Emilia. Since 1996 the district has a partnership with the Polish city Mysłowice. As two municipalities left the city in a communal reform in 1995, the partnership also includes Imielin and Chelm Slaski. In March 2001 the Enzkreis together with the city Pforzheim started a friendship with the Hungarian Komitat Györ-Moson-Sopron.

== Coat of arms ==
The four diamonds in the coat of arms represent the four historic territories covered by the district: the Black Forest, the Heckengäu, Kraichgau and Stromberg. The wavy line in the middle represent the river Enz, which also gave the name to the district.

== Demographics ==
=== Population development ===
Year	Population
1973	154,720
1975	154,590
1980	162,142
1985	164,312
1987	164,639
1990	175,574
1995	186,812
2000	192,852
2005	196,417
2010	193,913
2015	196,066
2020	199,752

== Cities and towns ==
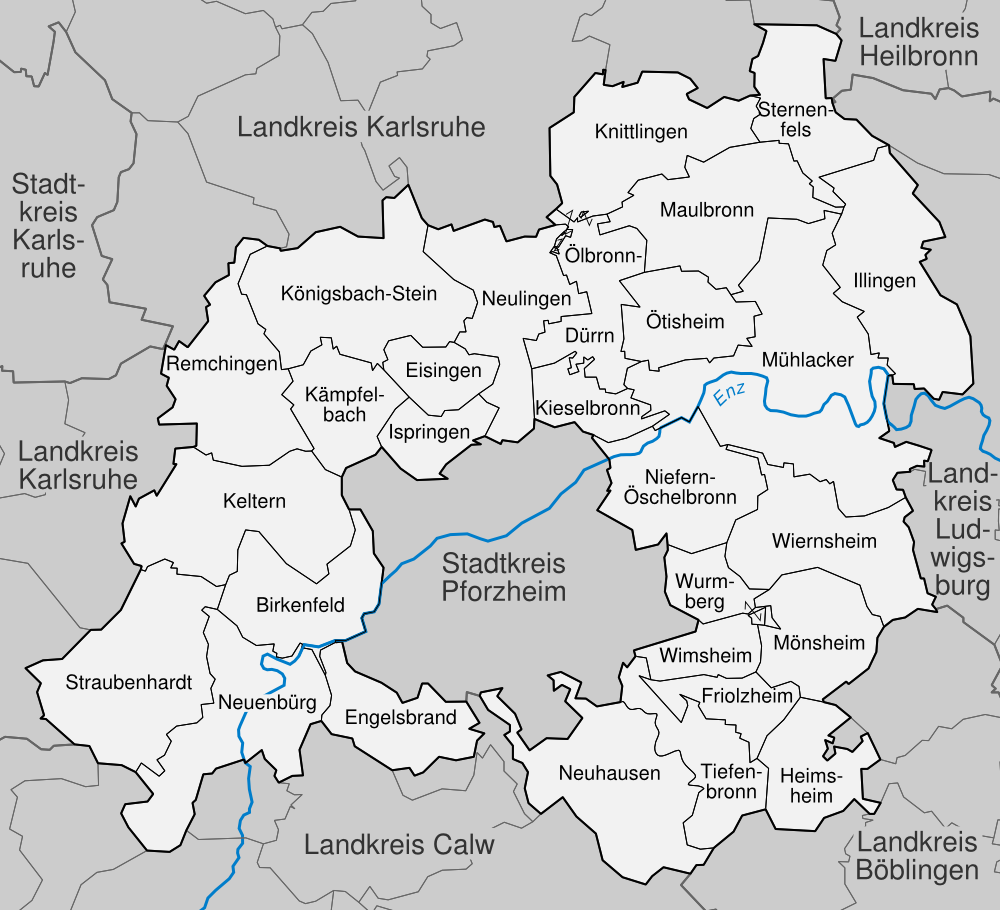
Clickable map of towns and municipalities in the district

Cities	Towns
1. Heimsheim; 2. Knittlingen; 3. Maulbronn; 4. Mühlacker; 5. Neuenbürg	1. Birkenfeld (Enz); 2. Eisingen; 3. Engelsbrand; 4. Friolzheim; 5. Illingen (Enz); 6. Ispringen; 7. Kämpfelbach; 8. Keltern; 9. Kieselbronn; 10. Königsbach-Stein; 11. Mönsheim; 12. Neuhausen (Enz)	13. Neulingen; 14. Niefern-Öschelbronn; 15. Ölbronn-Dürrn; 16. Ötisheim; 17. Remchingen; 18. Sternenfels; 19. Straubenhardt; 20. Tiefenbronn; 21. Wiernsheim; 22. Wimsheim; 23. Wurmberg
Administrative districts	1. Birkenfeld (Enz); 2. Eisingen; 3. Engelsbrand; 4. Friolzheim; 5. Illingen (Enz); 6. Ispringen; 7. Kämpfelbach; 8. Keltern; 9. Kieselbronn; 10. Königsbach-Stein; 11. Mönsheim; 12. Neuhausen (Enz)	13. Neulingen; 14. Niefern-Öschelbronn; 15. Ölbronn-Dürrn; 16. Ötisheim; 17. Remchingen; 18. Sternenfels; 19. Straubenhardt; 20. Tiefenbronn; 21. Wiernsheim; 22. Wimsheim; 23. Wurmberg
1. Heckengäu; 2. Kämpfelbachtal; 3. Maulbronn; 4. Mühlacker; 5. Neuenbürg; 6. Neulingen	1. Birkenfeld (Enz); 2. Eisingen; 3. Engelsbrand; 4. Friolzheim; 5. Illingen (Enz); 6. Ispringen; 7. Kämpfelbach; 8. Keltern; 9. Kieselbronn; 10. Königsbach-Stein; 11. Mönsheim; 12. Neuhausen (Enz)	13. Neulingen; 14. Niefern-Öschelbronn; 15. Ölbronn-Dürrn; 16. Ötisheim; 17. Remchingen; 18. Sternenfels; 19. Straubenhardt; 20. Tiefenbronn; 21. Wiernsheim; 22. Wimsheim; 23. Wurmberg
