= Ölbronn-Dürrn =

German municipality

- Municipality
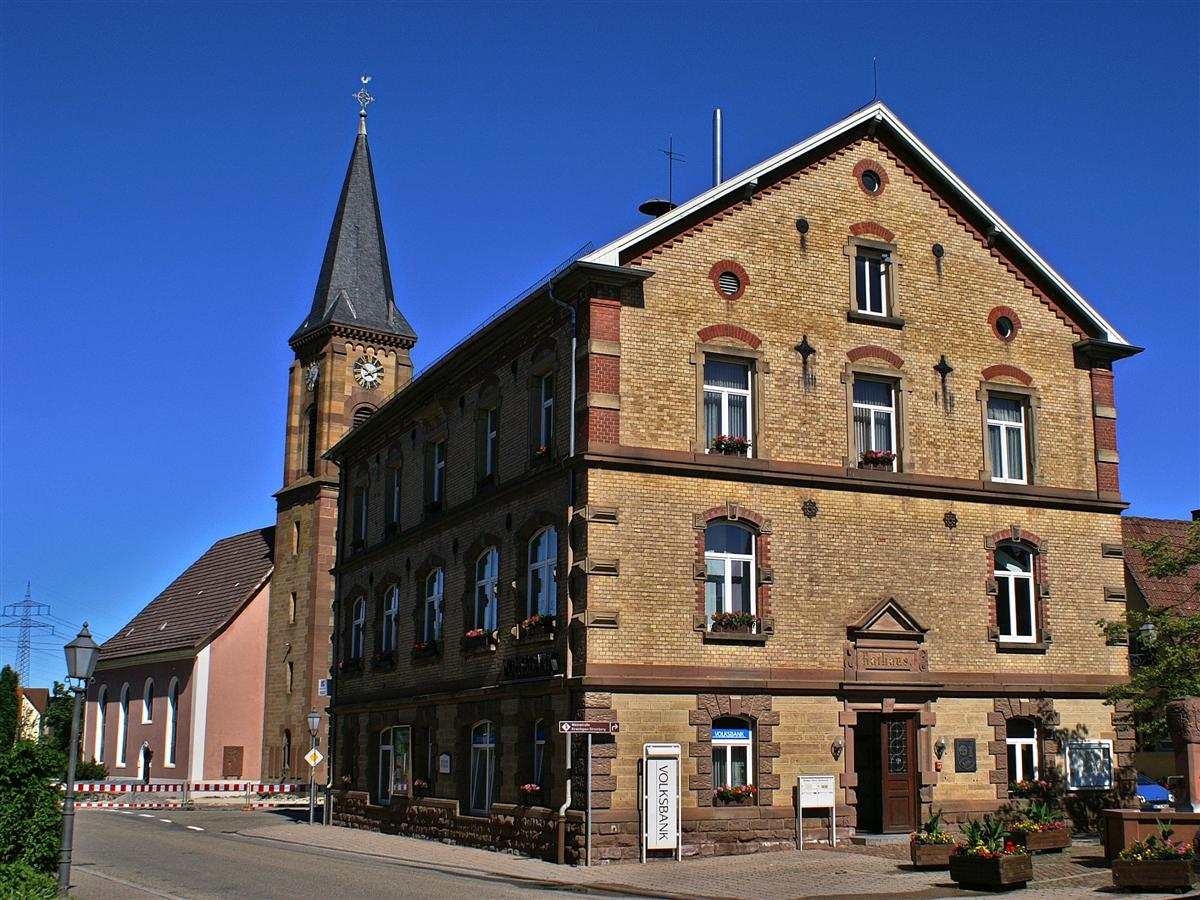
- Ölbronn town hall

- Coat of arms

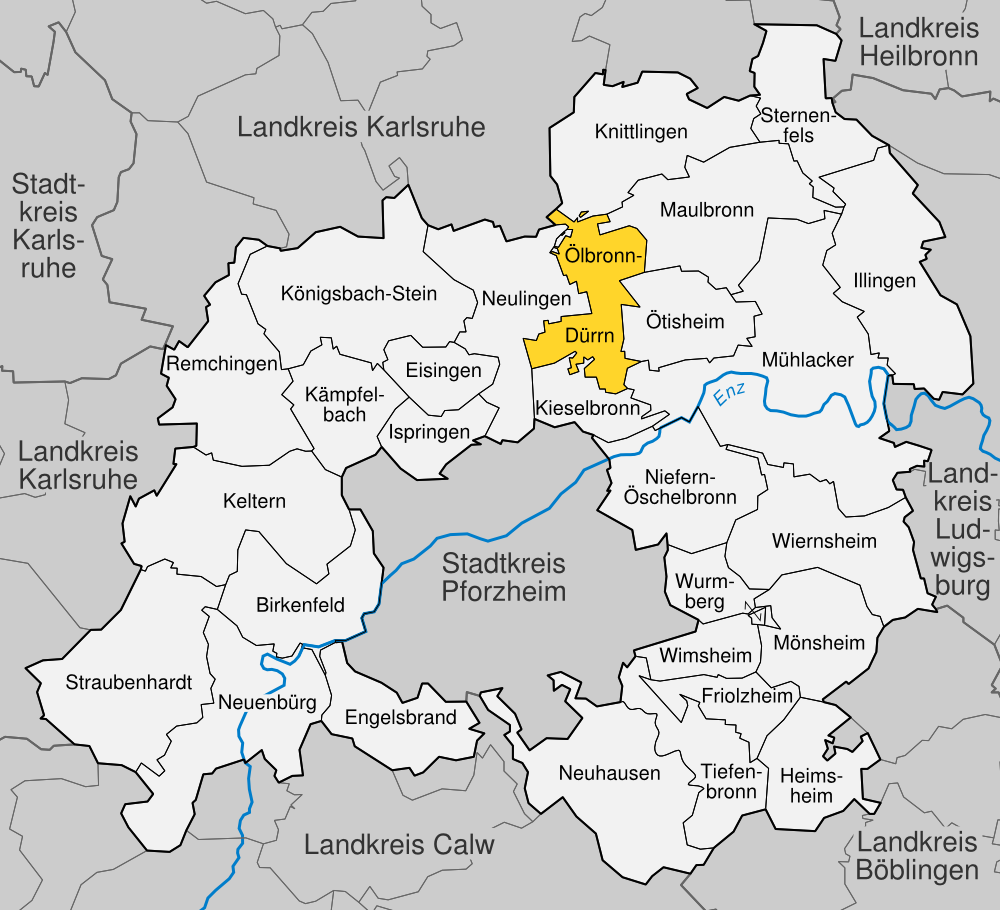
- Location of Ölbronn-Dürrn within Enzkreis district
- Interactive map of Ölbronn-Dürrn
- Location within Germany Location within Baden-Württemberg
- Coordinates: 48°57′25″N 8°45′26″E
- Country: Germany
- State: Baden-Württemberg
- Admin. region: Karlsruhe
- District: Enzkreis

Government
  - Mayor (2022–30): Norman Tank

Area
  - Total: 15.64 km^{2} (6.04 sq mi)
- Elevation: 291 m (955 ft)

Population (2025-12-31)
  - Total: 3,530
  - Density: 226/km^{2} (585/sq mi)
- Time zone: UTC+01:00 (CET)
  - Summer (DST): UTC+02:00 (CEST)
- Postal codes: 75248
- Dialling codes: 07043 Ölbronn; 07237 Dürrn
- Vehicle registration: PF
- Website: www.oelbronn-duerrn.de

Ölbronn-Dürrn is a municipality in the Enz district of Baden-Württemberg, Germany.

== History ==
Ölbronn was a property of Maulbronn Monastery until 1504, when it became a possession of the Duchy of Württemberg. Maulbronn's district, which Ölbronn was assigned to, was reorganized as Oberamt Maulbronn on 18 March 1806. When the Oberamt was dissolved on 1 October 1938, Ölbronn was reassigned to Landkreis Vaihingen.

Dürrn became a possession of the Margraviate of Baden in 1730 and was assigned to the Oberamt of Pforzheim. The town remained in Pforzheim's jurisdiction through reorganizations in 1809, 1819, and on 1 October 1864, and again on 25 June 1939, when the district became Landkreis Pforzheim.

On 1 January 1973, as part of the 1973 Baden-Württemberg district reform, Ölbronn and Dürrn were assigned to the newly created Enz district. The two townships merged into a single municipality, Ölbronn-Dürrn, on 1 July 1974.

== Geography ==
The municipality (Gemeinde) of Ölbronn-Dürrn covers 15.64 square kilometers (6.04 mi^{2}) of the Enz district of Baden-Württemberg, a state of the Federal Republic of Germany. It is physically located on the Stromberg, where its loess-covered keuper and muschelkalk hills meet the flat and dry Bauschlotter Plateau. Elevation above sea level in the municipal area varies from a low of 218 meters (715 ft) Normalnull (NN) where the Salzach flows into Knittlingen, to a high of 369 meters (1,211 ft) NN at the top of the Eichelberg.

The Alder, Metten and Gründelbach lowlands and Bauschlotter Au Federally-protected nature reserves are located in the municipal area.

On the municipal area of Ölbronn-Dürrn, there is a lake, which emits occasionally toxic gases. On December 20, 2020, these gases (mainly carbon monoxide) lead to the death of a man and a critical intoxication of his wife .

== Coat of arms ==
Ölbronn-Dürrn's municipal coat of arms displays a black, four-spoked wheel and a red tower fort on a field of gold and above a green hill upon which is a golden acorn and oak leaf. The four-spoked wheel is from the coat of arms of Ölbronn, and has been a symbol associated with the town since 1895. The red tower has likewise been a symbol of Dürrn since the 19th century. The hill and oak leaf and acorn refer to the Eichelberg. The municipal pattern was approved by the Enz district office on 25 September 1985.
