= Maulbronn =

German town

- Town
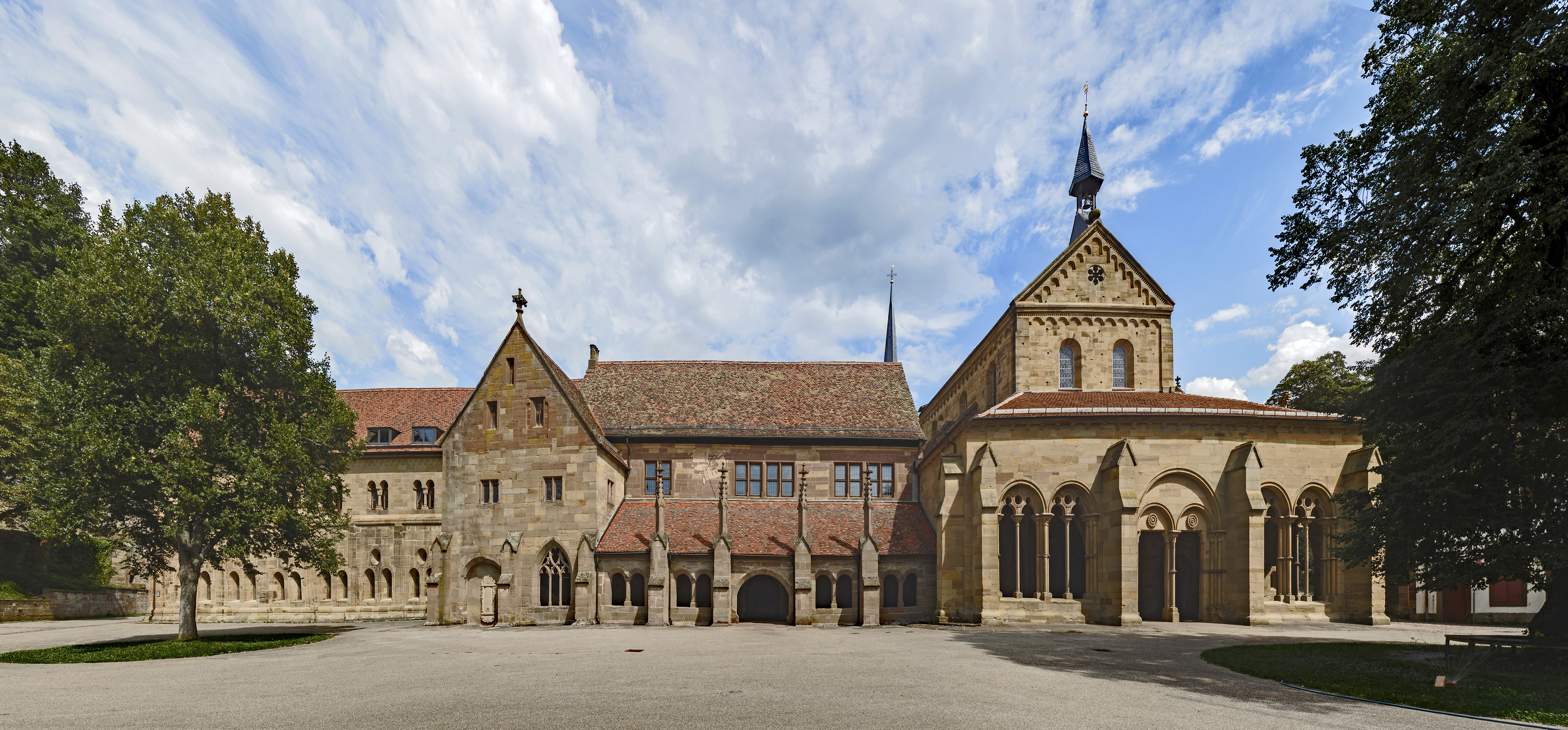
- Maulbronn Monastery

- Coat of arms

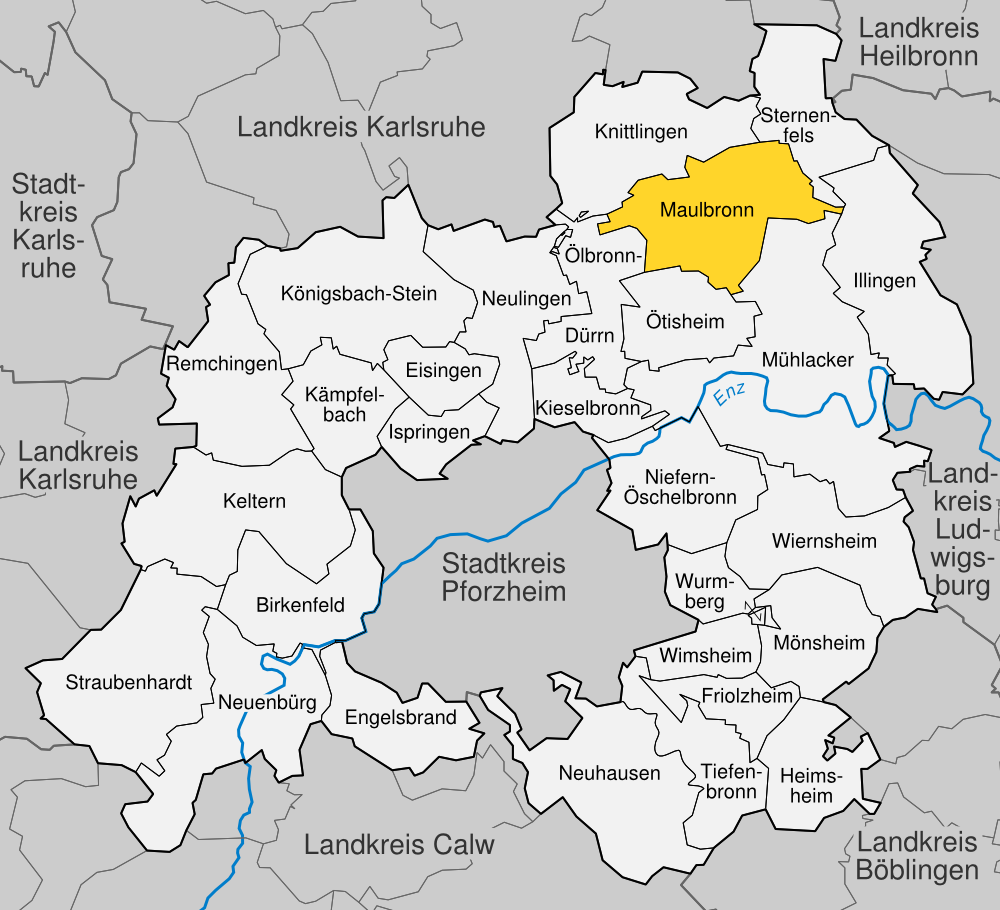
- Location of Maulbronn within Enzkreis district
- Interactive map of Maulbronn
- Location within Germany Location within Baden-Württemberg
- Coordinates: 49°0′1″N 8°48′39″E
- Country: Germany
- State: Baden-Württemberg
- Admin. region: Karlsruhe
- District: Enzkreis

Government
  - Mayor (2023–31): Aaron Treut

Area
  - Total: 25.44 km^{2} (9.82 sq mi)
- Elevation: 251 m (823 ft)

Population (2025-12-31)
  - Total: 6,371
  - Density: 250.4/km^{2} (648.6/sq mi)
- Time zone: UTC+01:00 (CET)
  - Summer (DST): UTC+02:00 (CEST)
- Postal codes: 75433
- Dialling codes: 07043
- Vehicle registration: PF
- Website: www.maulbronn.de

Maulbronn (German pronunciation: [maʊlˈbʁɔn]) is a city in the district of Enz in Baden-Württemberg in southern Germany.

== History ==
Founded in 1838, it emerged from a settlement, built around a monastery, which belonged to the Neckar Community in the Kingdom of Württemberg. In 1886, Maulbronn officially became a German town and was an administrative centre until 1938. The return of many displaced persons following the Second World War significantly raised the local population.

Of particular note is the town's monastery, Maulbronn Abbey, which features prominently in Hermann Hesse's novel, Beneath the Wheel. The former Cistercian monastery has been a UNESCO World Heritage Site since 1993.

Legend has it that the settlement was founded by monks who followed a mule to a valley with a source of clean water. The valley was also blessed with large deposits of soft sandstone for building. The monks built the original abbey and erected a fountain to honour the mule. The town name means mule fountain.

According to legend, the monks of Maulbronn also invented the pasta dish Maultasche.

== Activities ==
Maulbronn has a lake which is called "Tiefersee" which stands for "deep lake". The deep lake is an attraction from May to September. Once a year there is a great Rock festival. The Turkish community of Maulbronn is organizing once a year a huge soccer tournament which is well visited and participated from all over Germany and sometimes even Poland, Austria and France.

== Coat of arms ==
The blazon of the coat of arms means: "In black on a abased, double-rowed from red and silver bar a to the left swept flowing gold fountain and a standing gold mule with a gold burden."

== Partner cities ==
Partner cities/twin towns of Maulbronn are

- (France) Valdahon
