= Enz Valley Railway =

Railway line in Germany

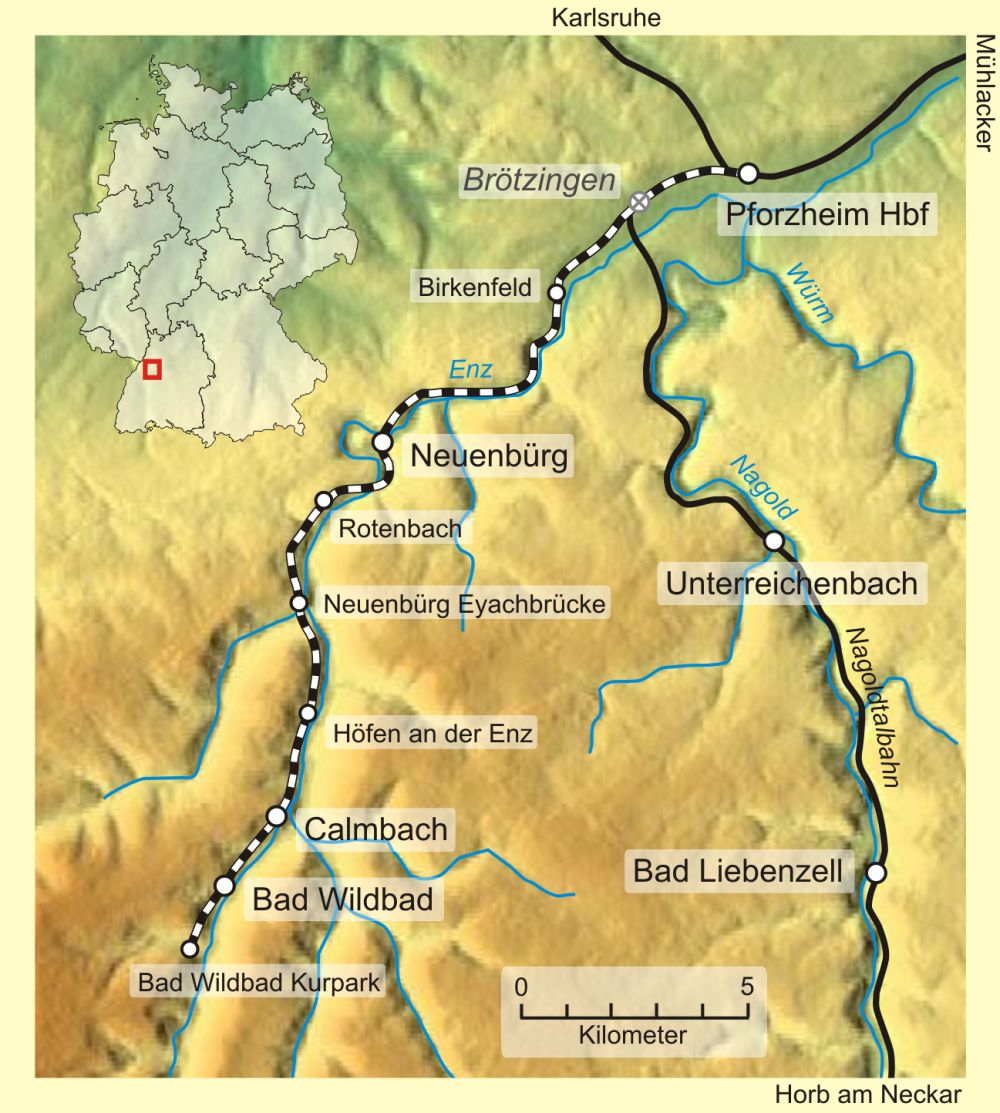

Overview
- Native name: Enztalbahn
- Line number: 4850 (Pforzheim–Hochdorf); 4851 (Brötzingen–Bad Wildbad); 4853 (Pforzheim–Brötzingen)
- Locale: Baden-Württemberg, Germany
- Termini: Pforzheim Hbf 48.8938°N 8.7030°E; Bad Wildbad Kurpark 48.7487°N 8.5505°E

Service
- Route number: 710.6 ex 302a

Technical
- Line length: 23.7 km (14.7 mi)
- Track gauge: 1,435 mm (4 ft 8 1/2 in) standard gauge
- Electrification: 750 V DC; 15 kV/16.7 Hz AC overhead catenary

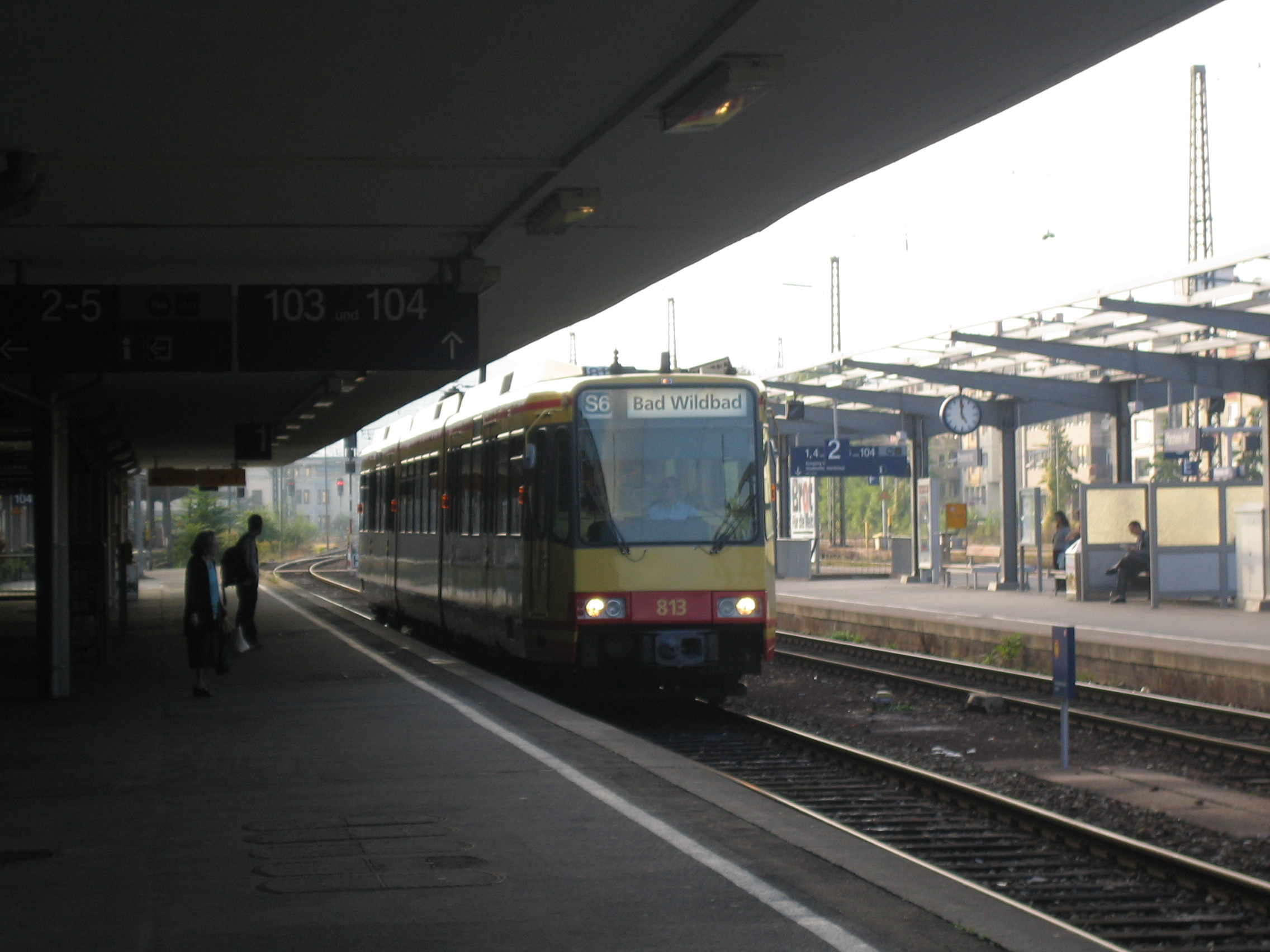
Stadtbahn car in Pforzheim Hauptbahnhof, the starting point of the Enztalbahn

The Enz Valley Railway (Enztalbahn or Enzbahn) is a 23.6 km (14.7 mi) long railway line in the northern part of the Black Forest in the German state of Baden-Württemberg. The line runs from Pforzheim to Bad Wildbad and for its course runs close to the River Enz.

The line was opened by the Grand Duchy of Baden State Railway on 11 June 1868 and is one of the oldest railways in Germany. It is now integrated into the Karlsruhe Stadtbahn as line S 6.

== Route ==
The Enz Valley line is located in the northern Black Forest and the entire line runs along the Enz river. From Pforzheim Central Station to Brötzingen Wohnlichstraße it runs within the limits of the city of Pforzheim, from Birkenfeld to Neuenbürg Eyachbrücke it runs through Enzkreis and the rest of the line runs through the Calw district. It runs through the five municipalities of Pforzheim, Birkenfeld, Neuenbürg, Höfen an der Enz and Bad Wildbad.

The line begins in Pforzheim station, where there are connections to the line from Karlsruhe to Mühlacker. Since 2002, the Enz Valley Railway has run together with the Nagold Valley Railway from to Horb on a two-track line through Pforzheim to Brötzingen Mitte station. Previously, the two lines had run parallel as independent single-track lines.

From Brötzingen the line follows the valley of the Enz through Birkenfeld, Neuenbürg, Höfen an der Enz to Calmbach (part of the municipality of Bad Wildbad since 1974) and then the valley of the Großen Enz to Bad Wildbad. In Neuenbürg the line twice crosses the Enz and passes under Schlossberg (hill) through a 135-metre-long tunnel.

At its penultimate stop in Bad Wildbad, the S6 also connects with the Sommerbergbahn funicular railway.

The line to Bad Wildbad is equipped with the 15 kV AC overhead electrification system used by Deutsche Bahn. The extension of the line from Bad Wildbad station through the town of Bad Wildbad is electrified as a tramway with 750 V DC. The terminus of the line is located at the entrance to the spa.

== History ==
The Kingdom of Württemberg had been planning to build a railway to Wildbad from the 1850s. Already during the construction of the Württemberg Western Railway from Stuttgart to Bruchsal and the construction of the connecting line from Pforzheim via Mühlacker to Karlsruhe by the Grand Duchy of Baden State Railway, the possibility of building a railway into the Enz valley was considered. The reason for this comparatively early planning was primarily the former importance of Bad Wildbad as a spa, which was favoured by the kings of Württemberg. The construction of the railway line would make the journey of aristocrats as pleasant as possible and promote the importance of Bad Wildbad as a fashionable resort.

There was a problem, however, in that the limitations of railway technology at the time meant that the line through the Enz valley could only run through Pforzheim, which was in the Grand Duchy of Baden, so a treaty between Württemberg and Baden was necessary to regulate the construction of the railway. Württemberg secured the right to build the Enz Valley Railway and Nagold Valley Railway through Pforzheim station in 1863. In return the Baden government was able to build the line from Karlsruhe to Mühlacker, where it would connect with the Western Railway to Stuttgart. Thus the government of Württemberg introduced two bills on 26 April 1858 that would ensure the construction of the railway from Pforzheim to Wildbad. These were enacted on 17 November 1858. The construction work began in 1865 under the leadership of Carl Julius Abel. The Royal Württemberg State Railways built a separate wing of Pforzheim station southwest of the facilities of the Baden State Railways. At the same time construction work began on the already planned Nagold Valley Railway from Pforzheim to Calw, with the track formation prepared for two tracks, with the northern path reserved for the Enz Valley Railway and the southern path reserved for the Nagold Valley Railway.

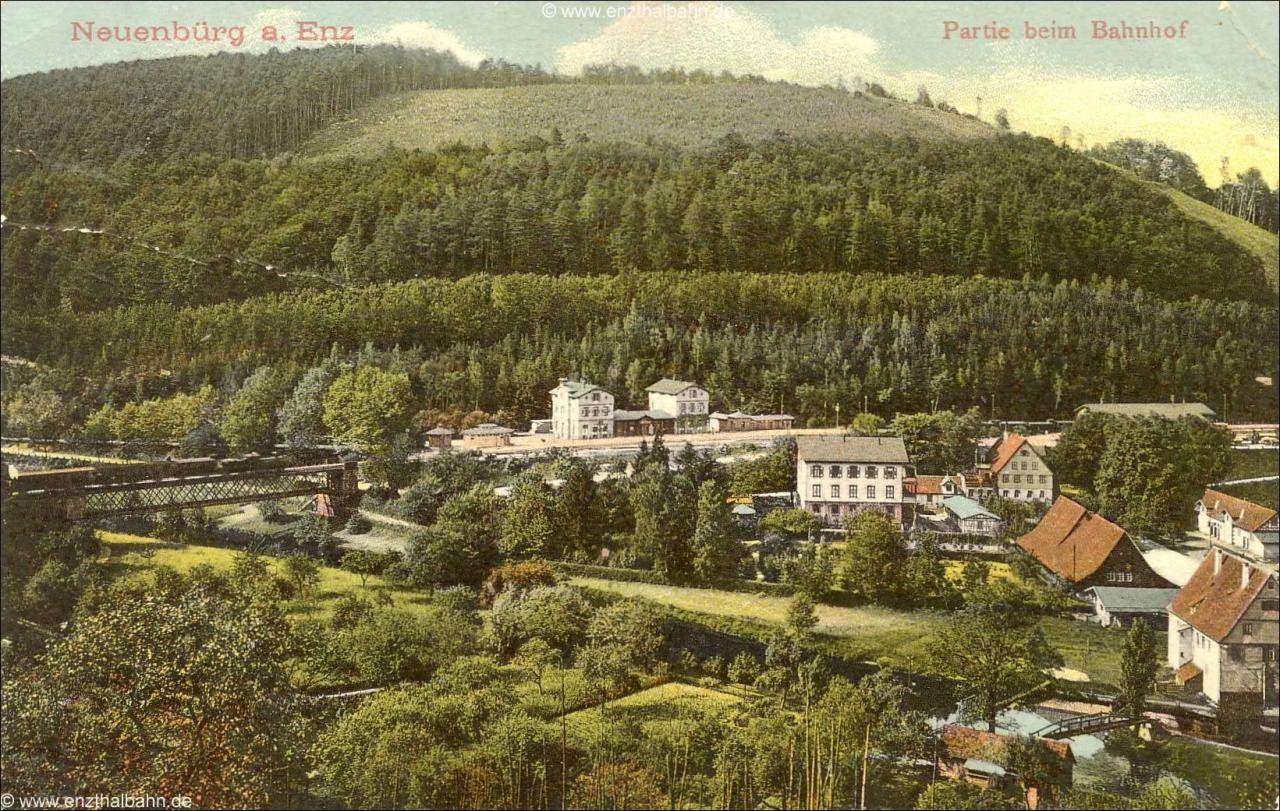
Neuenbürg station around 1907

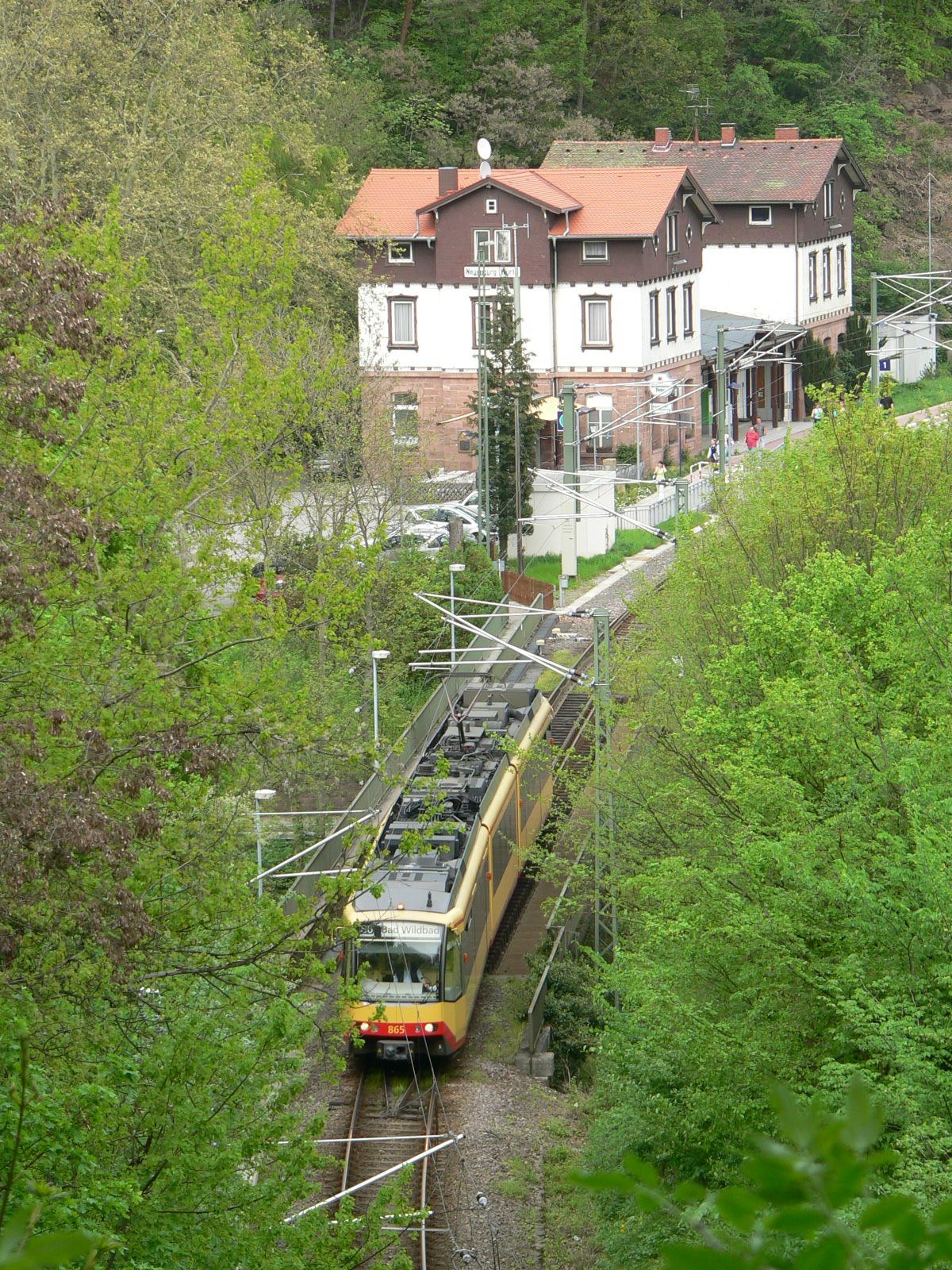
The Enz Valley Railway in Neuenbürg

=== Württemberg State Railways (1868–1919) ===
On 11 June 1868, the Enz Railway was opened, following several trial runs during the previous two months. Initially, it was isolated from the rest of the network of the Württemberg State Railways: passengers from Stuttgart to Bad Wildbad had to use services of the Baden State Railways between Mühlacker and Pforzheim. Only the opening of the Nagold Valley Railway in 1874 allowed an alternative connection from Stuttgart via Weil der Stadt, Calw and Brötzingen to Bad Wildbad. This was a significantly more difficult route than the line via Mühlacker and its only advantage from Württemberg's perspective was that it ran only through Wurttemberg, although in Brötzingen it ran for a few kilometres close to Baden territory. To facilitate these trips a connecting curve was built between the Enz and Nagold Valley Railways bypassing Brötzingen station.

In the first decades of its existence, the market developed very positively on the Enz Valley Railway, and several prominent guests of the resort—for example, in 1903 Queen Wilhelmina of the Netherlands—travelled by train specifically for a cure at Wildbad. In addition to the carriage of passengers to Bad Wildbad, trains, even including at times expresses, were used to carry freight on the final section of the route. The transport of wood and wood products was particularly important. The most important customers for freight for decades were the Krauth & Co. sawmill (at the time Württemberg's largest sawmill) at the former Rotenbach station and the timber yard in the Eyach valley.

As Neuenbürg lies on a sweeping bend of the Enz and the line cuts through the neck of the bend in a tunnel, Neuenbürg station was built to the northeast of the town. To improve the accessibility of the line to Neuenbürg, Neuenbürg Stadt halt was opened southeast of the town on 6 August 1909. In the following years there were plans to duplicate the railway between Calmbach and Wildbad, but their realisation was prevented by the outbreak of World War I.

=== German Reichsbahn (1920–1949) ===
After the First World War, the route was absorbed by the newly founded Deutsche Reichsbahn and administered by the railway division (Direktion) of Karlsruhe.

In the 1930s, the Nazi organization Strength through Joy (Kraft durch Freude) organised trips on several weekends to Wildbad. In addition, Neuenbürg Stadt station received facilities for handling baggage.

Because the Enz Valley Railway, unlike other Black Forest lines, had no connecting lines and had no military significance, it was largely spared from attack during the Second World War. An attempt to bomb the bridge at Neuenbürg missed its target and instead hit one at nearby Schlossberg.

After the Second World War, services on the Enz Valley Railway were resumed on 10 July 1945.

=== Deutsche Bundesbahn and Deutsche Bahn (1949–2002) ===
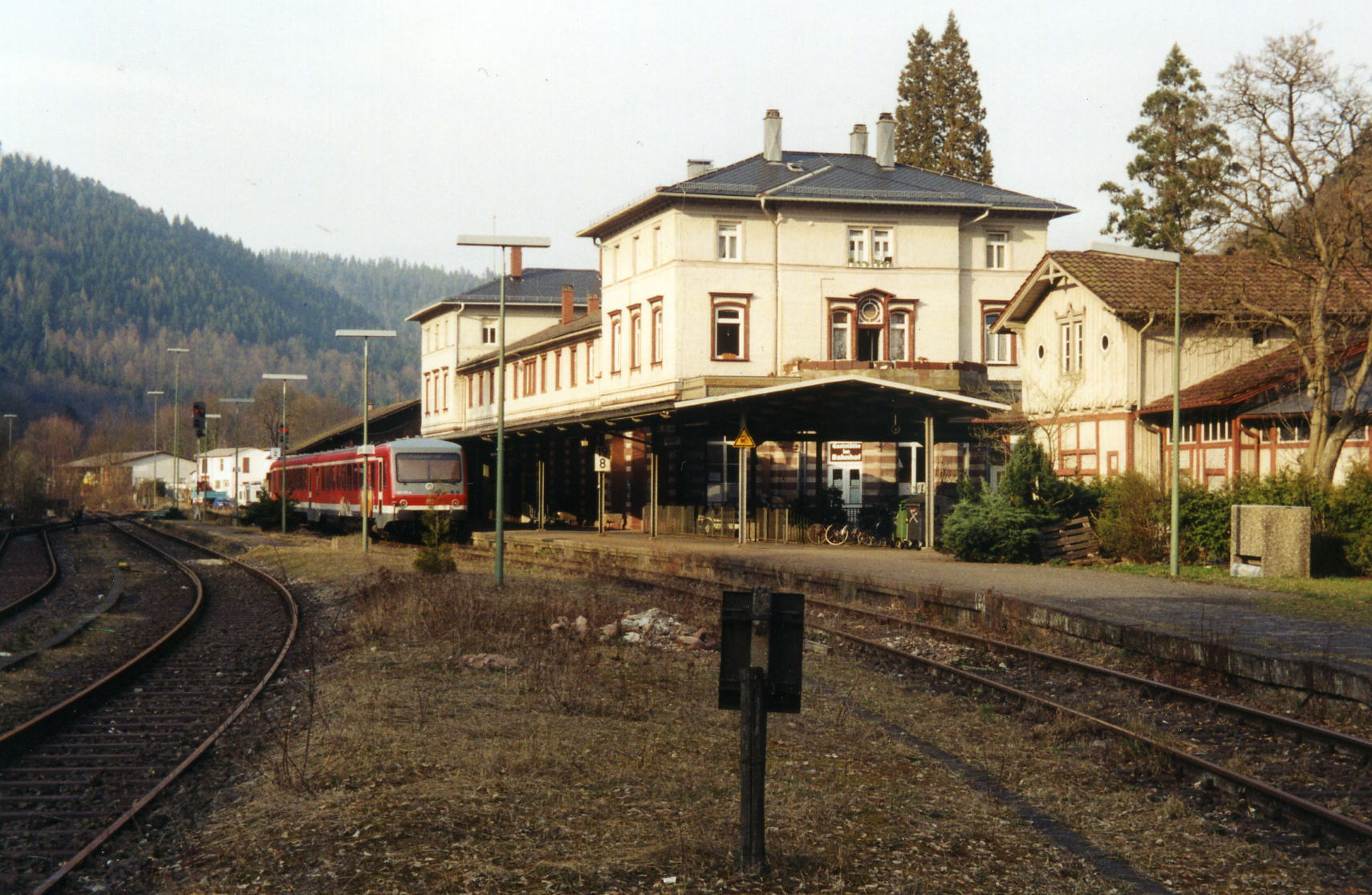
Bad Wildbad station in spring 2002 before the Stadtbahn upgrade

In the second half of the 20th century the line increasingly lost its importance. This was due to the increasing competition from cars and trucks, the decline in the traditional tourist traffic to Wildbad and the importance of companies such as the Krauth & Co sawmill.

Although Deutsche Bundesbahn attempted to counteract competition through the use of railbuses and the replacement of steam by diesel locomotives from 1962, it could not stem the loss of traffic. The signal boxes in Neuenbürg and Bad Wildbad were rationalised and replaced by more modern equipment in 1976 and the stations of Birkenfeld, Höfen and Calmbach were subsequently downgraded to halts, so that it was only possible for trains to cross in Neuenbürg. Rotenbach station was closed for freight transport in 1964 and for passenger traffic in 1975. The same fate had occurred in Engelsbrand as early as 1960 due to its remote location.

The decline in traffic to the spa at Bad Wildbad led to the abandonment of express trains. Since 1950, the only long-distance connections remaining on the line had been single through coaches from at least as far away as Dortmund and from Emden. These were abandoned in 1995 to reduce costs. In 1988, class 628 diesel multiple units replaced the railbuses. The loss of freight and low passenger numbers meant that the line was threatened with closure.

=== Albtal-Verkehrs-Gesellschaft (since 2002) ===
An initiative of the Albtal-Verkehrs-Gesellschaft (Alb Valley Transport Company, AVG) brought a new approach to the line. Following its success on the neighbouring Alb Valley Railway from Karlsruhe to Bad Herrenalb, it suggested in March 1995 that the line be adapted for light rail (stadtbahn) operations. The attractiveness of the line in Bad Wildbad would be increased if it was extended to the spa park (Kurpark).

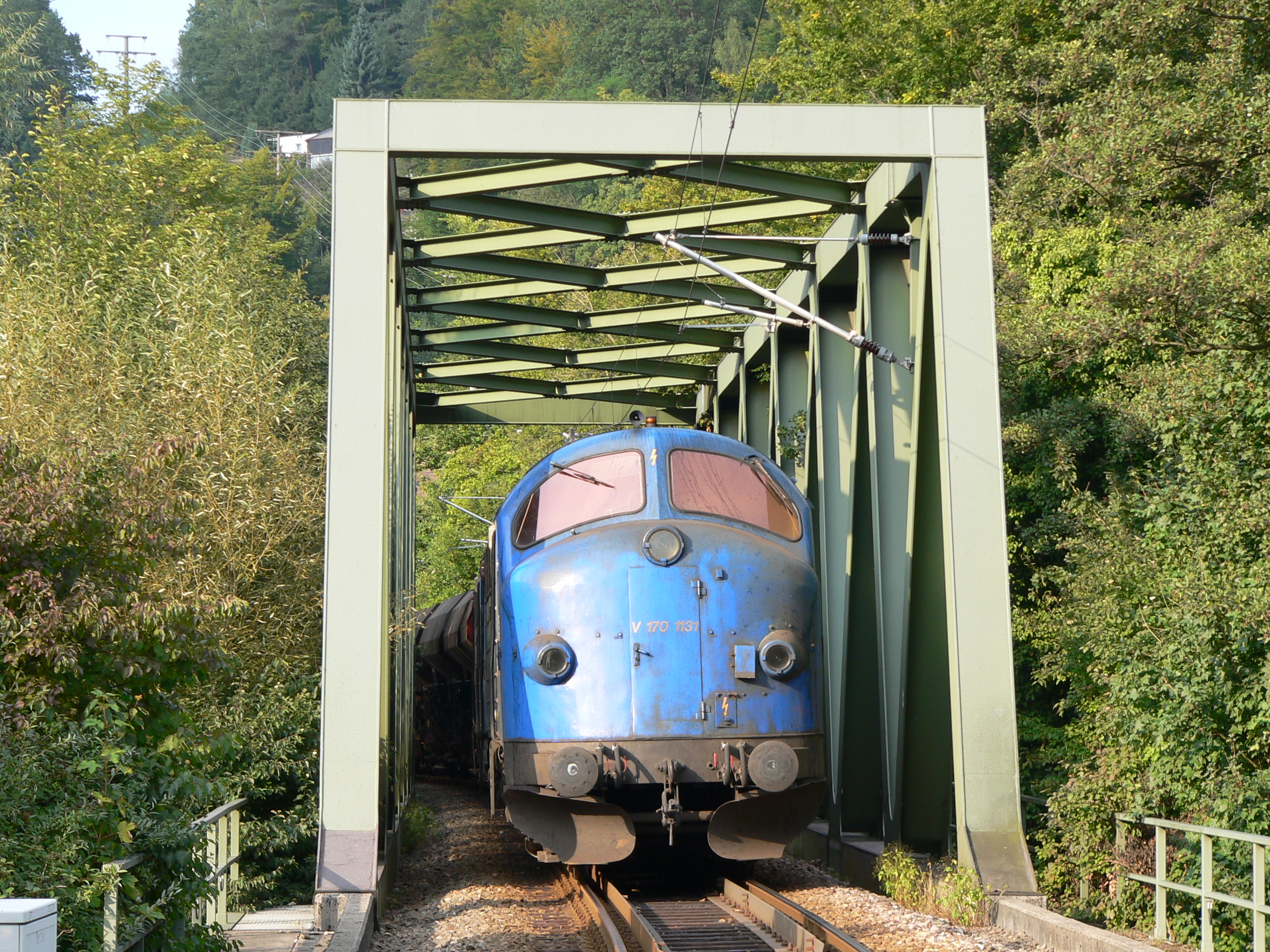
Construction train on the Enz Bridge south of the Schlossberg Tunnel in Neuenbürg

With the political support of the state of Baden-Württemberg and the adjacent municipalities and districts, the line was taken over by AVG on 1 January 2000 under a 25 years lease from Deutsche Bahn and the line began to be converted for light rail operations. This included the modernisation of the tracks, the electrification of the line and the renovation of Brötzingen station; the unused station building still stands at the 0 kilometre mark. New stations were established at Maihälden Pforzheim, Brötzingen Sandweg, Brötzingen Wohnlichstraße, Neuenbürg Freibad, Rotenbach, Eyachbrücke, Höfen Nord, Calmbach Süd and Bad Wildbad Nord; one more stations at Pforzheim Durlacher Straße is planned. Calmbach station became a crossing station and new signals were installed.

In addition, the line in Bad Wildbad was extended by one kilometre to Kurpark and this section, due to space limitations, was designed as a light railway line and electrified at 750 V DC, while the line between Pforzheim and Bad Wildbad station was electrified with the mainline railway system (15 kV AC, 16.7 Hz). As a result, only the two-system sets of the Karlsruhe Stadtbahn can be used on the last kilometre of the line. The cost of reconstructing the line for Stadtbahn operations totalled DM 59.9 million.

Rail operations were launched in two stages: on 14 December 2002, operations commenced between Pforzheim and Bad Wildbad station; services were extended to Bad Wildbad Kurpark on 4 October 2003. The introduction of Stadtbahn operation also involved more frequent trains and expanded hours of operation.

Since 25 May 2014, the line has been controlled from the Karlsruhe central control centre. The line has been acquired by the AVG.

== Operations ==
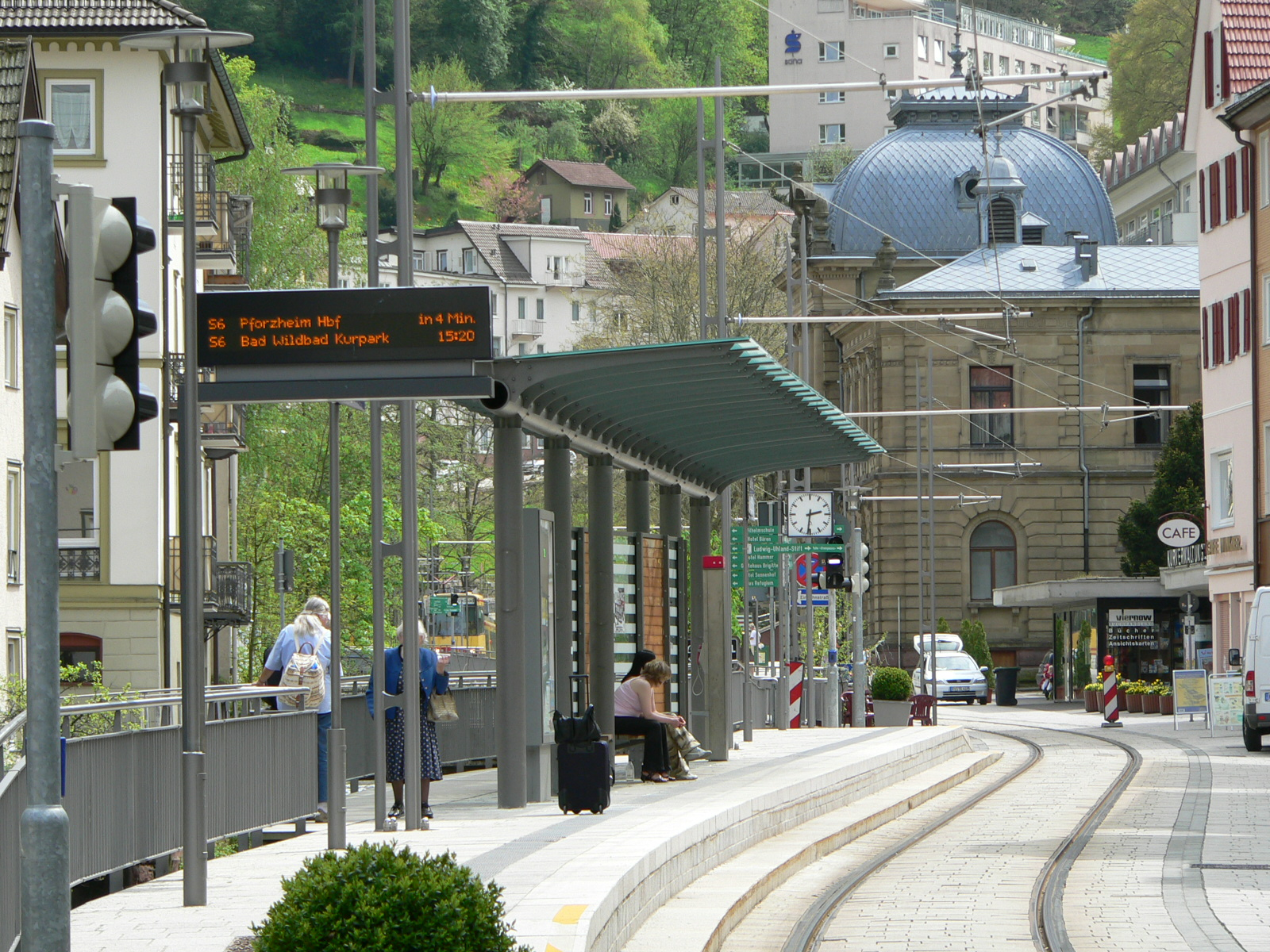
Uhlandplatz stop/Sommerbergbahn in the centre of Bad Wildbad

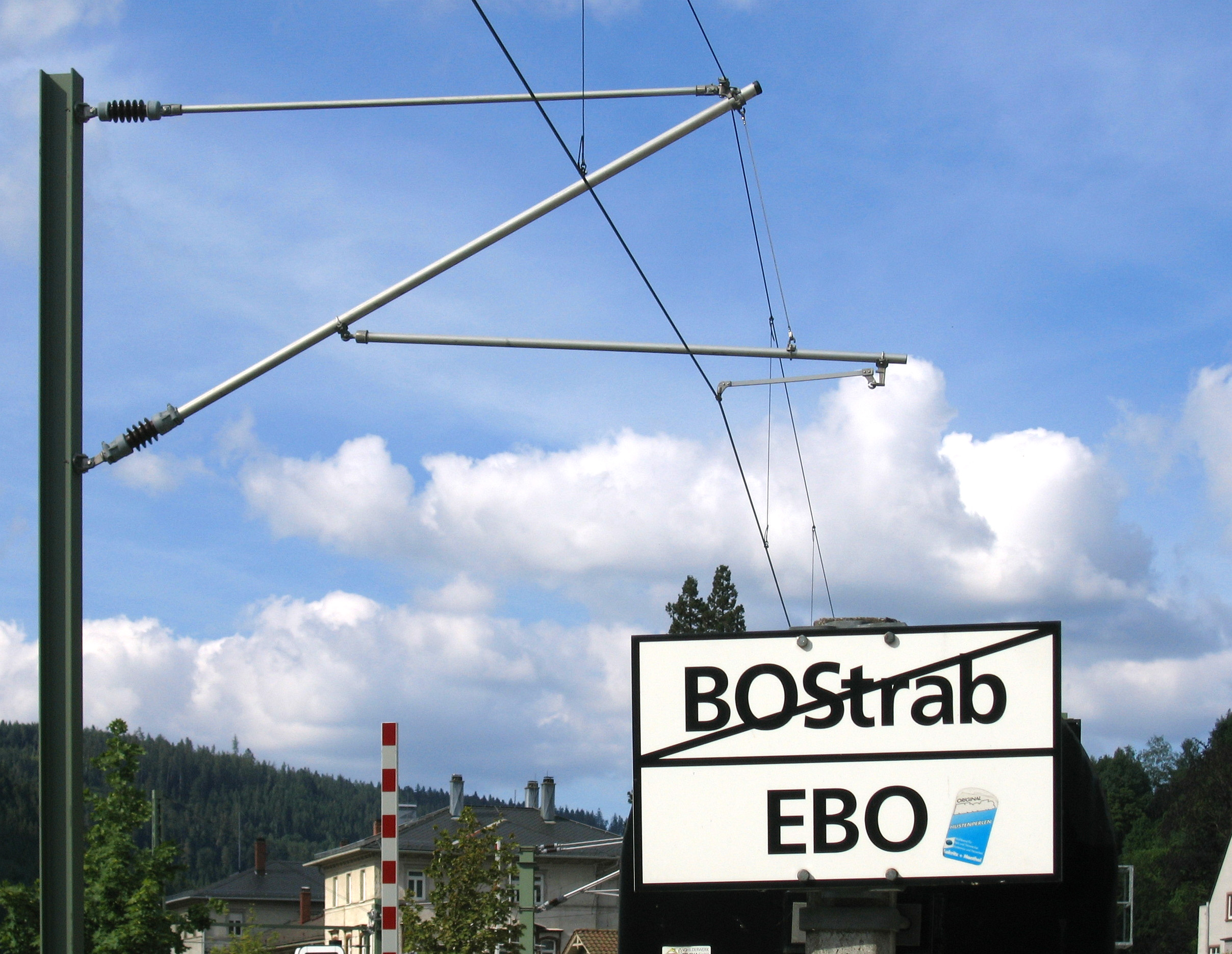
Transition between light rail and heavy rail operation in Bad Wildbad station

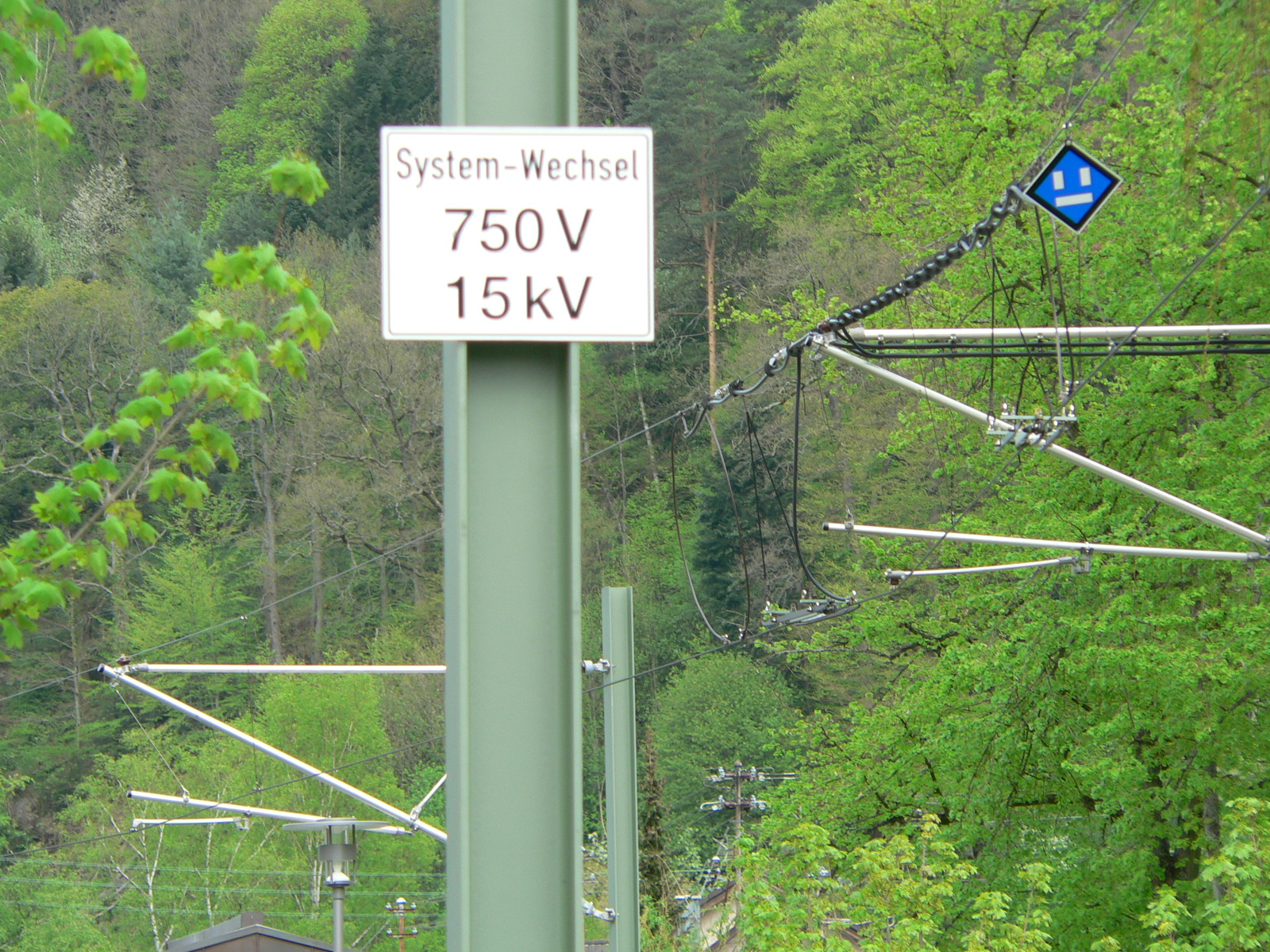
Electrical system change in Bad Wildbad

The Enz Valley Railway is integrated into the Karlsruhe Stadtbahn as line S 6. The operation of the two-rail system Stadtbahn sets are managed by Albtal-Verkehrs-Gesellschaft. It runs on weekdays instead from 5:00 AM until 1:00 AM, with at least one service per hour, with services running during busy periods twice an hour (either every 30 minutes or with intervals alternating between 20 and 40 minutes). On weekends services operate hourly throughout the day, starting at 6:00 AM. Some services link in Pforzheim with Stadtbahn line S 5 and run via Karlsruhe to Wörth or to Bietigheim-Bissingen.

Since 2003, the so-called Enztäler Freizeitexpress has run on some summer Sundays from Stuttgart to Bad Wildbad station and back. This service is operated with historic class ET 25 electric multiple units by Stuttgart's Schienenverkehrsgesellschaft (rail transport company, SVG) and includes an extra baggage car for carrying bicycles.

Regular freight trains no longer run on the Enz Valley Railway.

== Rolling stock ==
Until 1962, steam locomotives were used on the line. These were replaced by Uerdingen railbuses and trains hauled by class V 100 diesel locomotives. In 1988, the locomotive-hauled trains were replaces by class 628 diesel multiple units; in 1993 these took over all passenger services on the line. Since late 2002, services on the line have been operated by Albtal-Verkehrs-Gesellschaft’s two-system Stadtbahn vehicles of class GT8-100C/2S and GT8-100D/2S-M.

== Intermediate stations ==
Train crossings are possible on the line between Pforzheim Hbf and Brötzingen Mitte only at the stations of Neuenbürg, Calmbach and Bad Wildbad. Rotenbach and Höfen an der Enz Nord halts have platforms that are only 20 metres long because the potential passenger traffic is very low.
