= Eutingen (Baden) station =

Railway station in Germany

Eutingen (Baden)

General information
- Location: Brauereistraße 3; 75181 Eutingen an der Enz; Baden-Württemberg; Germany
- Coordinates: 48.9098°N 8.7439°E
- System: Hp
- Owner: Deutsche Bahn
- Operator: DB Station&Service
- Lines: Karlsruhe–Mühlacker railway (KBS 770)
- Platforms: 2 side platforms
- Tracks: 2
- Train operators: SWEG Bahn Stuttgart
- Connections: 1 735

Construction
- Parking: yes
- Cycle facilities: no
- Accessible: partly

Other information
- Station code: 1737
- DS100 code: TEB
- IBNR: 8001942
- Category: 5
- Fare zone: VPE: 10; KVV: VPE (VPE transitional tariff, season and select daily passes only)
- Website: www.bahnhof.de

Services
Preceding station	(Stuttgart)	Following station
Pforzheim Hbf towards Karlsruhe Hbf or Bad Wildbad	MEX 17a	Niefern towards Stuttgart Hbf
Location
- Location within Baden-Württemberg Location within Germany Location within Europe

Eutingen (Baden) station (German: Haltepunkt Eutingen (Baden)) is a railway station in the municipality of Eutingen an der Enz, located in the Enzkreis district in Baden-Württemberg, Germany.
