= Pforzheim Hauptbahnhof =

Railway station in Germany

Pforzheim Hbf
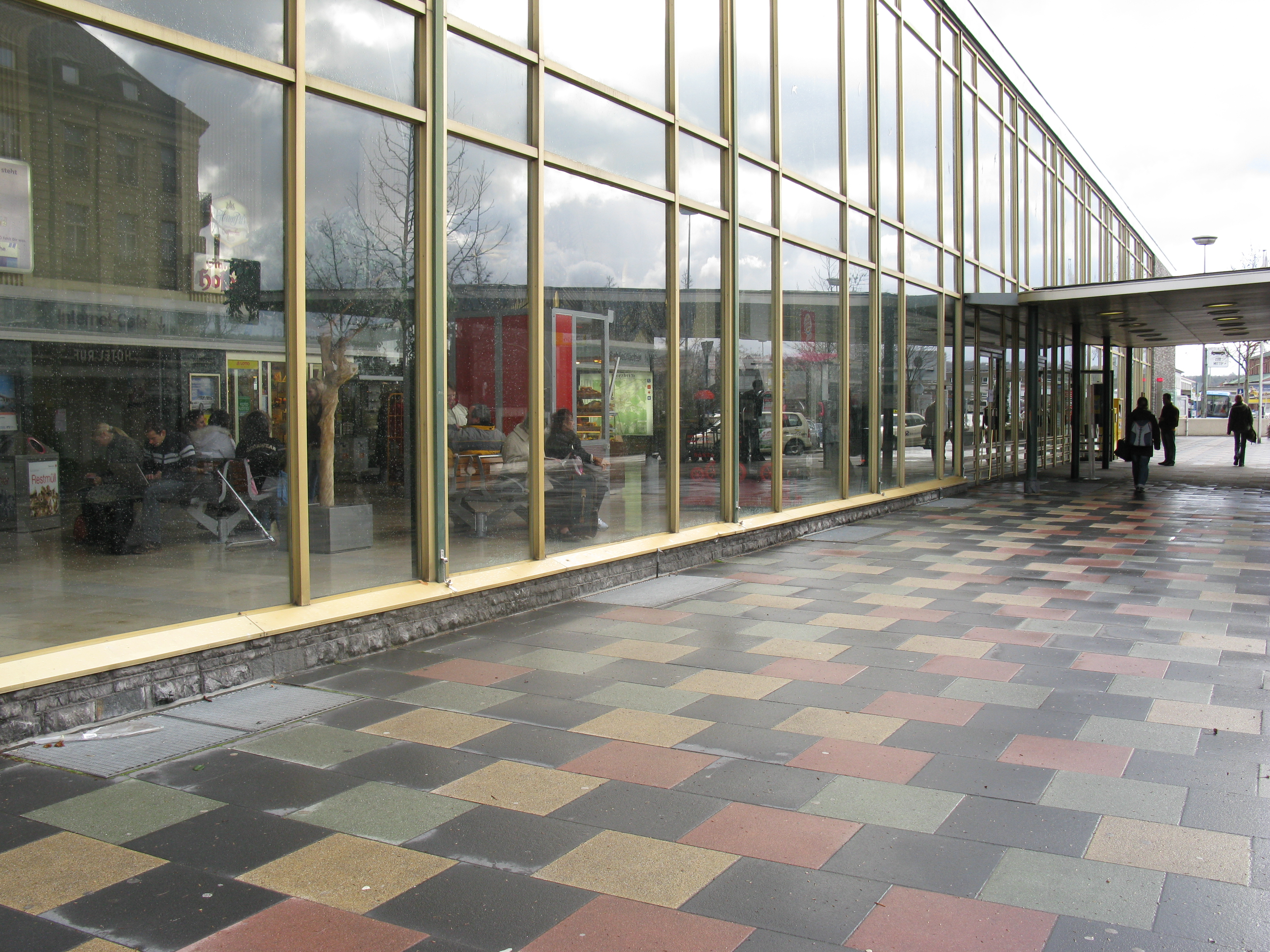

General information
- Location: Bahnhofplatz 1, Pforzheim, Baden-Württemberg; Germany
- Coordinates: 48°53′37″N 8°42′11″E
- Owner: Deutsche Bahn
- Operator: DB Station&Service
- Lines: Karlsruhe–Mühlacker; Pforzheim–Bad Wildbad; Pforzheim–Horb
- Platforms: 7

Construction
- Accessible: Yes
- Architect: Helmuth Conradi
- Architectural style: Modernist

Other information
- Station code: 4922
- DS100 code: TPH
- IBNR: 8000299
- Category: 2
- Fare zone: VPE: 10; KVV: VPE (VPE transitional tariff, season and select daily passes only); VGC: 950 (VPE transitional tariff)
- Website: www.bahnhof.de

History
- Opened: 4 July 1861

Passengers
- ca. 50,000 daily
Services
Preceding station	DB Fernverkehr	Following station
Karlsruhe Hbf Terminus	IC 61	Mühlacker towards Nürnberg Hbf or Leipzig Hbf
Preceding station		Following station
Wilferdingen-Singen towards Karlsruhe Hbf	RE 1	Mühlacker towards Aalen Hbf
Preceding station	(Stuttgart)	Following station
Wilferdingen-Singen towards Karlsruhe Hbf	MEX 17a	Eutingen (Baden) towards Stuttgart Hbf
Neuenbürg (Württ) towards Bad Wildbad	MEX 17a	Eutingen (Baden) towards Stuttgart Hbf
Preceding station	DB Regio Baden-Württemberg	Following station
Terminus	RB 72 Limited service	Maulbronn West towards Maulbronn Stadt
Pforzheim Maihälden towards Tübingen Hbf	RB 74	Terminus
Preceding station	Karlsruhe Stadtbahn	Following station
Ispringen towards Wörth Badepark	S 5	Terminus
Pforzheim Maihälden towards Bad Wildbad	S 6	Terminus
Location

Pforzheim Hauptbahnhof is the main station in the city of Pforzheim in the German state of Baden-Württemberg.

== History ==
The first Pforzheim station was opened on the 3 July 1861 on the Karlsruhe–Mühlacker railway by the Grand Duchy of Baden State Railway (Großherzoglich Badische Staatseisenbahnen). With the opening of the Enz Valley Railway (Enztalbahn) to Wildbad (11 June 1868) and the Nagold Valley Railway (Nagoldtalbahn) to Horb (1 June 1874), Pforzheim developed into an interchange station with considerable traffic. Both lines were operated by the Royal Württemberg State Railways (Königlich Württembergischen Staats-Eisenbahnen) and they received their own platform tracks to the west of the station.

The station building was built in 1861 in the neoclassical style and consisted of a long, single-storey central building with two-story wings at right-angles at each end. It was destroyed on 23 February 1945 during the bombing of Pforzheim.

=== New building of 1958 ===
The new station building was opened in June 1958. The architect was Helmuth Conradi (1903–1973), who had already designed the entrance building of Heidelberg Hauptbahnhof, which was opened in 1955. The defining component is the entrance hall, which has a glass facade opening to the station forecourt that runs from the floor to the eaves. A very thin canopy marks the main entrance; its cladding with gold-anodised aluminum plates refers to the importance of the watch and jewelry industry for Pforzheim.

Inside the hall, strips on the ceiling that continue along the back wall are used for indirect lighting. The lobby is framed by two granite walls, windowless on the left and with a station clock and a large trapezoidal window on the right. Service rooms open onto the platform. Two annexes with the station restaurant and a waiting room for buses extend beyond the line made by the front of the entrance building.

In the main hall there is a large wall relief by Josef Karl Huber, on the theme of the "Gold City [Pforzheim] at the gate of the Black Forest" (Goldstadt an der Schwarzwaldpforte), which includes a dynamic pattern of swinging curves. The architect Conradi and the artist Huber had met in an English prisoner of war camp and spent two years together there. The building has been described as "one of the finest and most modern station building of Deutsche Bundesbahn" and has been listed as a cultural monument of the post-war period since 1989. The listing was instigated by plans of Deutsche Bundesbahn to replace a counter by a travel centre on the ground floor of the station. The heritage office then placed the station under protection, so that the necessary alterations did not alter the original nature of the building.

The refurbishment of the station started at the beginning of February 2011. Three lifts were put into operation in June 2012, providing barrier-free access to the platforms.

In a second construction phase, starting in October 2015, the platforms on the tracks 1, 2/3, 4/5 and 103/104 were raised to 55 centimetres above the top of the rail to allow easier and sometimes stepless access to the trains.

The work was due to be completed in spring 2017. The conversion cost €7.3 million, of which the city of Pforzheim funded €1.8 m.

West of the main station, Abellio Rail Baden-Württemberg plans to build a depot with sidings between the end of 2017 and the beginning of 2019.

== Rail services ==
As a station on the east–west route from Paris via Straßburg, Karlsruhe, Stuttgart and Munich to Vienna, Pforzheim was a stop for the Orient-Express in 1883. The spa of Wildbad at the end of the Enz Valley Railway was a significant destination for through coach connections for decades and the attachment and detachment of coaches to/from the trains of the Enz Valley Railway were made partly in Pforzheim. The last through coach connection to Wildbad were discontinued in 1995. The Nagold Valley Railway was served predominantly by regional services; between 1952 and 1964 an express train operated from Frankfurt running via Pforzheim and Horb to Konstanz.

Pforzheim Hauptbahnhof lost importance from 1991 for long-distance traffic with the opening of the Mannheim–Stuttgart high-speed railway for long-distance trains between Karlsruhe and Stuttgart, which made it possible to bypass Pforzheim using a connecting curve at Bruchsal. The loss of long-distance connections is strongly criticised locally. In the 2017/2018 timetable, long-distance traffic at the station is limited to services on Intercity line 61, which run every two hours between Nuremberg and Karlsruhe. The station is also served by several regional services operated at regular intervals, including an Interregio-Express/ Regional-Express line, a Regionalbahn line and two Karlsruhe Stadtbahn lines.

=== Long distance ===
Line	Route	Frequency
IC 61	Karlsruhe – Pforzheim – Mühlacker – Vaihingen – Stuttgart – Schorndorf – Schwäbisch Gmünd – Aalen – Ellwangen – Crailsheim – Ansbach – Nuremberg – Bamberg – Lichtenfels – Kronach – Saalfeld – Jena-Göschwitz – Jena Paradies – Naumburg – Weißenfels – Leipzig	Every two hours between Karlsruhe and Nuremberg, 2 train pairs to/from Leipzig

=== Regional services ===
Line	Route	Frequency
RE 1	Karlsruhe – Pforzheim – Mühlacker – Vaihingen (Enz) – Stuttgart (– Schorndorf – Aalen)	Hourly, every two hours to Aalen
MEX 17a	Stuttgart – Ludwigsburg – Bietigheim – Vaihingen – Mühlacker – Pforzheim – (Wilferdingen-Singen)	Every half hour to Bietigheim, hourly to Stuttgart
RB 74	Pforzheim – Bad Liebenzell – Calw – Nagold – Horb (– Tübingen)	Pforzheim – Nagold: every half hour (peak); Nagold – Horb: hourly Horb – Tübingen: some trains
RB 99 Klosterstadt-Express	(Pforzheim /) Mühlacker – Maulbronn West – Maulbronn Stadt	Some trains in the summer half-year
S 5	Wörth Dorschberg – Wörth – Karlsruhe-Knielingen – Karlsruhe Entenfang – Karlsruhe-Durlach – Söllingen – Pforzheim	Every half hour
S 6 Enztalbahn	Pforzheim – Brötzingen – Neuenbürg – Höfen – Bad Wildbad – Bad Wildbad Kurpark	Hourly (+extra peak hour services)

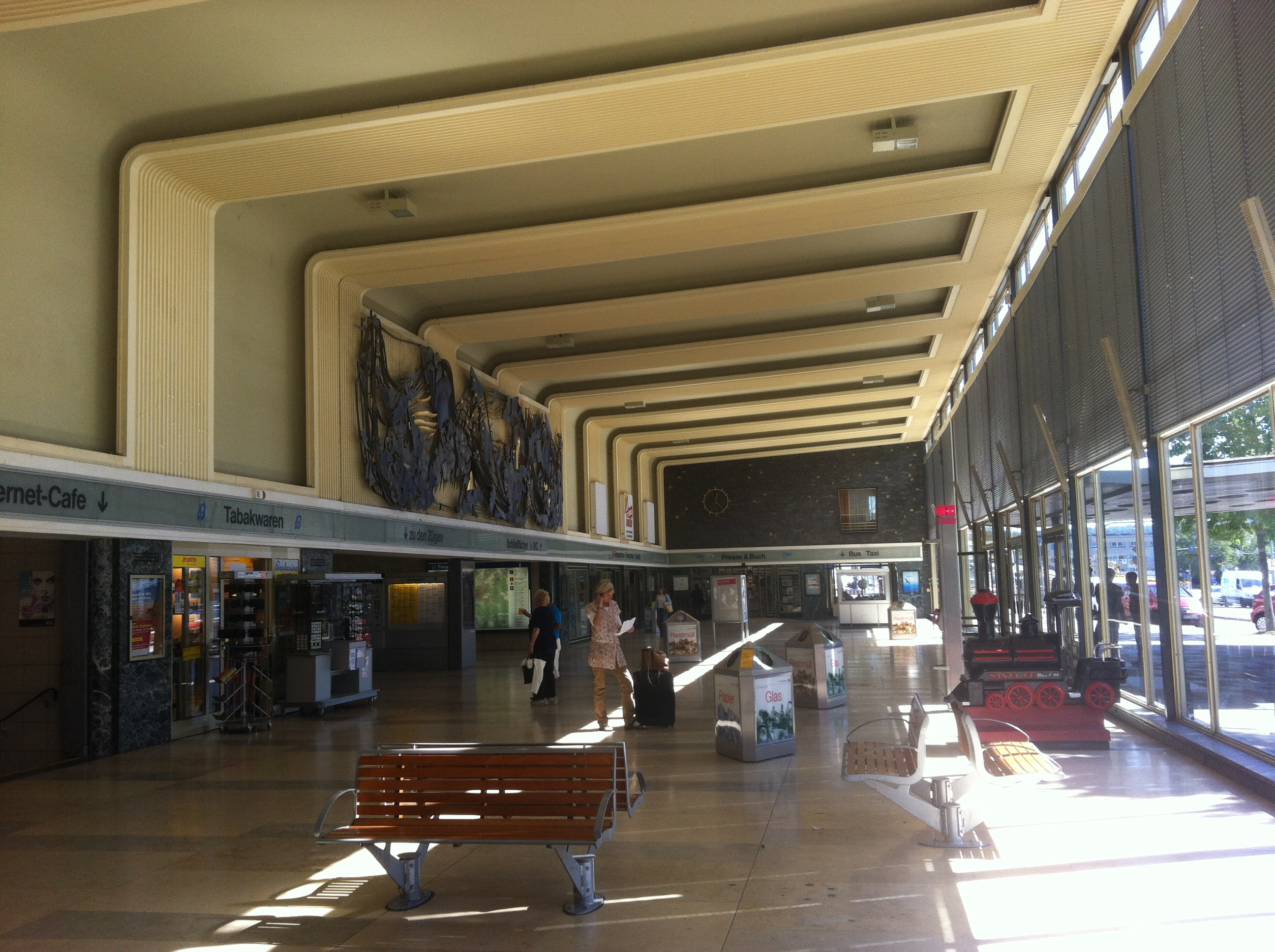
Entrance hall

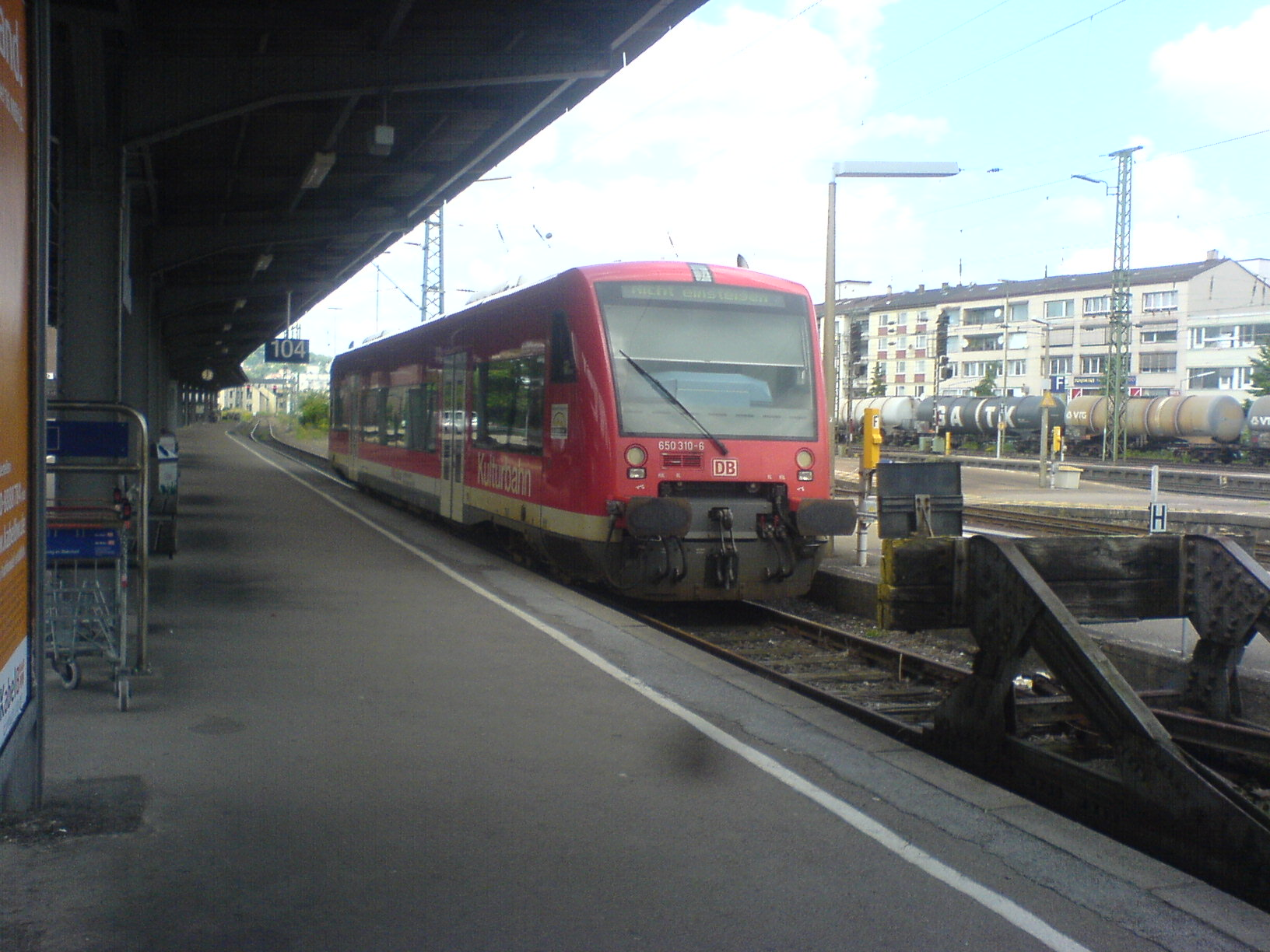
Regio-Shuttle at bay platform 104

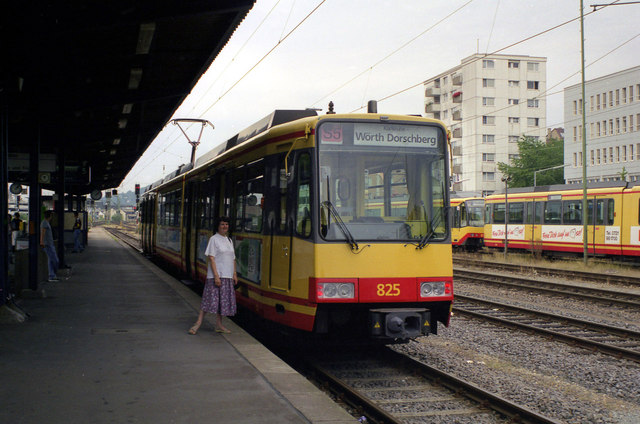
Albtal-Verkehrs-Gesellschaft Stadtbahn set in Pforzheimer Hauptbahnhof
