= Nagold Valley Railway =

Railway line in Germany

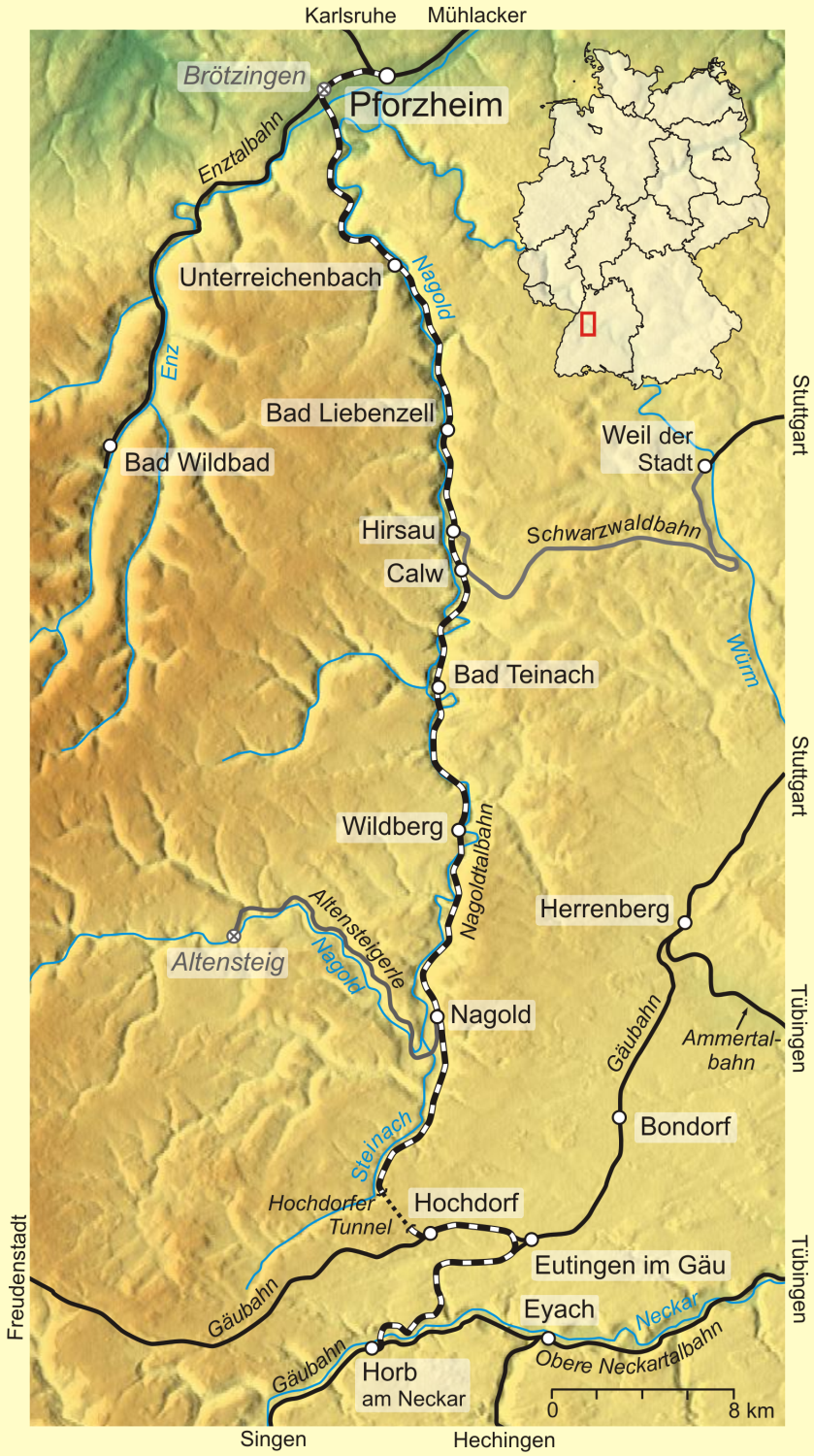

Overview
- Native name: Nagoldtalbahn
- Line number: 4850
- Locale: Baden-Württemberg, Germany
- Termini: Pforzheim; Hochdorf (b Horb)

Service
- Route number: 774

Technical
- Line length: 56.66 km (35.21 mi)
- Track gauge: 1,435 mm (4 ft 8 1/2 in) standard gauge

The Nagold Valley Railway (German: Nagoldtalbahn) is a railway line in the northern part of the Black Forest in Germany which links Pforzheim with Horb am Neckar and, for most of its route, follows the valley of the River Nagold.

Trains on the non-electrified, single-tracked main line are operated by DB Regionalverkehr Alb-Bodensee. Since 2005, the line has been designated and operated as a Kulturbahn ("cultural line"), together with the Upper Neckar Railway from Horb to Tübingen.

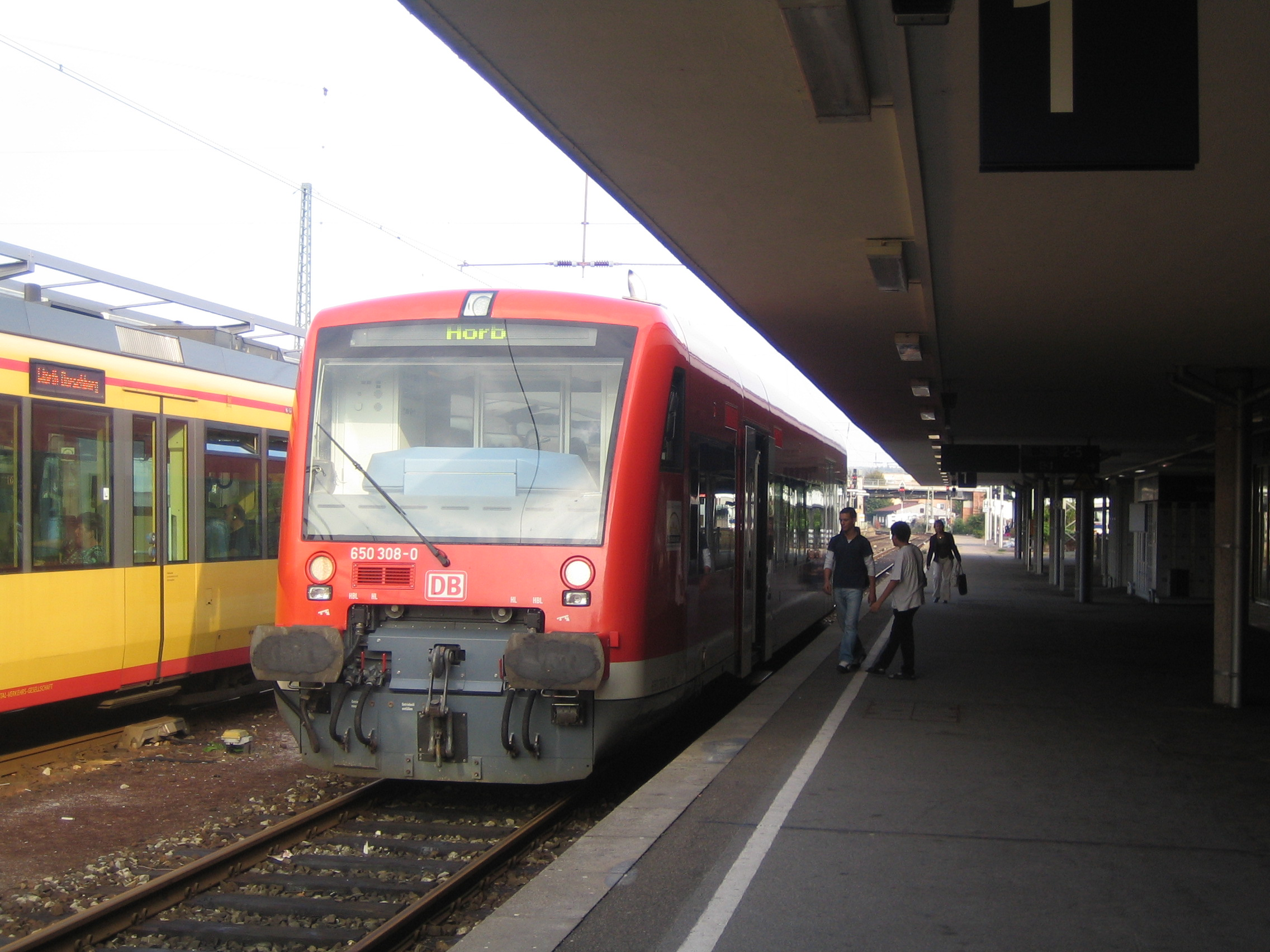
Nagold Valley Railway train at Pforzheim Central, the start of the line.

== Topography ==
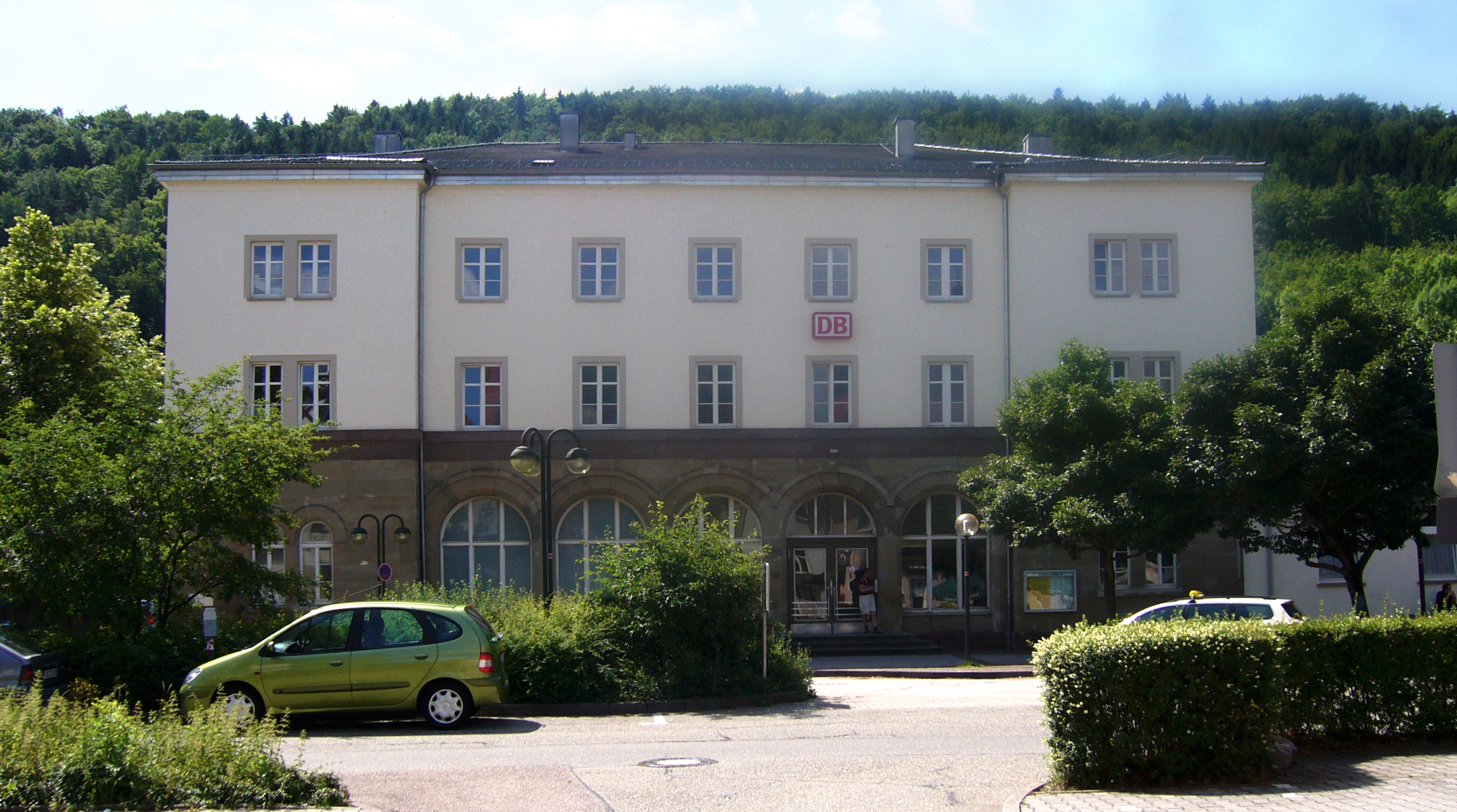
The station at Horb, terminus of the Nagold Valley Railway

The Nagold Valley Railway runs along the northeastern edge of the Black Forest. Leaving Pforzheim, it does not initially follow the River Nagold, but instead runs together with the Enz Valley Railway along the Enz, before diverging after 3 km in Brötzingen and running through a tunnel to the Nagold Valley. It follows the river to the town of Nagold, passing through several tunnels which shorten its route appreciably, so that the line between Calw and Nagold is several kilometres shorter than the road.

South of Nagold, the Black Forest gives way to the Gäu plateau. The railway leaves the floor of the Nagold valley south of Wildberg, after passing through the Bettenberg tunnel, and over the course of 13 km climbs the sides of the valleys of the Nagold and its tributary the Steinach to an altitude of 100 m. South of Schietingen it runs through the Hochdorf Tunnel to the level of the upper Gäu and at the Hochdorf station reaches its highest point of elevation, 511 m. From there the Nagold Valley Railway and the Eutingen–Freudenstadt Gäubahn run together for a few kilometers in a wide curve around the settlement of Eutingen im Gäu, before the Nagold Valley line merges with the Stuttgart–Singen Gäubahn at the position of the former Eutingen station (operated until 1933). The combined line then runs into the Eutingen Valley, leaving the Gäu and descending 100 m to Horb in the Neckar Valley.

The topography of the Black Forest posed many engineering challenges in constructing the line, which has a total of 21 bridges longer than 20 m, most of which cross the Nagold or the road running parallel to it, Bundesstraße 463; and also 10 tunnels, of which the Hochdorf Tunnel between Gündringen und Hochdorf is both the longest and the highest in altitude. The Hochdorf Tunnel was the longest tunnel in the Royal Württemberg State Railways system, far exceeding the second longest, the Weinsberg Tunnel.

== History ==
=== Planning and construction ===
On 18 February 1865, a treaty was concluded between Baden and Württemberg which included the construction of two railway lines. One line was to run from Pforzheim to Wildbad, the other from Pforzheim to Calw. On 25 April 1865, the third foundational Railways Act was passed into law in Württemberg by ministerial action of then Minister of State Karl von Varnbüler, and with that, the construction of the Nagold Valley Railway was finally decided.

The main reasons for planning such a line were: first, to create a route running north–south to Switzerland to rival the Baden Mainline between Mannheim and Basel, particularly since there was then no link between the Baden Station and the Central Station in Basel; and secondly, the section between Calw and Horb, together with the planned Württemberg Black Forest Railway between Stuttgart and Calw, was to make up a new north–south mainline to replace the Upper Neckar Railway opened in 1864. (A direct southwards connection from Stuttgart crossing the Gäu plateau was not initially undertaken because of the topographic problems).

However, the construction of railway lines in the northern Black Forest was delayed by the Austro-Prussian War of 1866. In the years 1868–1872 a total of 4 laws were passed intended to ensure the funds for the construction of the Nagold Valley Railway. In addition, in 1870–71 the Franco-Prussian War delayed the construction work which was being carried out for the Royal Württemberg State Railways.

=== Royal Württemberg State Railways (1868–1920) ===
The section of the line between Pforzheim and Brötzingen began service on 11 June 1868 as part of the Enz Valley Railway. Next, the Calw–Nagold section was built as part of the Württemberg Black Forest Railway originating in Stuttgart and opened on 20 June 1872.

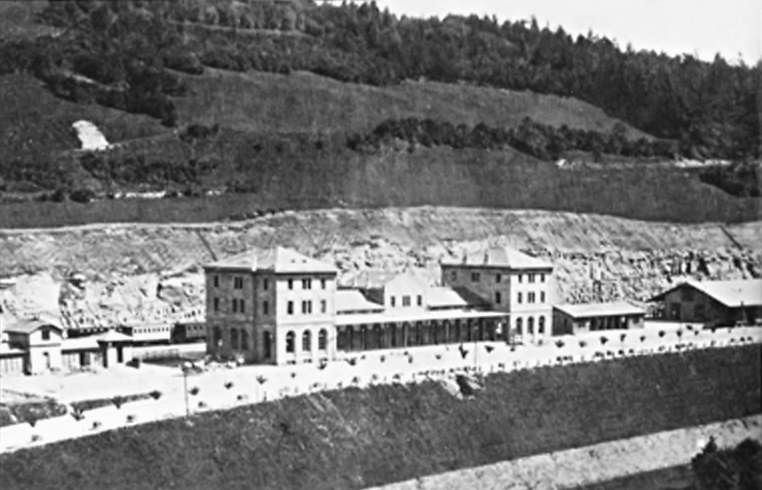
Calw station in 1872, in service until 1989.

On 1 June 1874, under the direction of Construction Supervisor Carl Julius Abel, the Brötzingen–Calw and Nagold–Horb sections were added, with which the entire Nagold Valley Railway was open to traffic.

Until the Second World War, the Nagold Valley Railway and the Enz Valley Railway both originated at a separate Württemberg railway terminal in Pforzheim, which was located alongside the Baden station on the Durlach–Mühlacker stretch of line. In addition, although the two lines followed the same route as far as Brötzingen, they ran as two parallel single tracks.

In addition, at the Brötzingen station there was a wye to make it possible to switch trains to either Stuttgart, Calw or Wildbad. The reason for this was that Württemberg—and above all the then reigning king, Charles I—wanted trains originating in the capital, Stuttgart, and bound for the spa town of Wildbad, which was considered a Württemberg dependency of Baden-Baden, to run within Württemberg borders for as long as possible. Therefore, trains were sent on the detour via the Nagold Valley Railway, including a change of direction at Calw, although a short portion of this route, between the Enz Valley Railway at Birkenfeld and Unterreichenbach, also ran through Baden territory. The connecting curve at Brötzingen was thus frequently referred to as 'the king's curve'.

Between Calw and Horb, long-distance trains from Stuttgart also ran on the Württemberg Black Forest Railway to Singen and from there to Lake Constance or Schaffhausen. However, only five years later, the Gäu Railway from Stuttgart to Freudenstadt via Eutingen was opened, which provided a markedly shorter route between Stuttgart and Switzerland via Böblingen and Horb; therefore, after that long-distance traffic accordingly shifted to that route. In view of this, the segment between Eutingen and Horb received a second track and was operated accordingly from 1887 onwards.

=== Deutsche Reichsbahn (1920–1945) ===
Following World War I the German railways were nationalised under the Deutsche Reichsbahn. The occupation of the city of Offenburg by France in 1923 meant that express trains from Karlsruhe to Basel, which would normally have run through the Rhine Valley, were appreciably diverted via the Nagold Valley Railway and the Höllen Valley Railway.

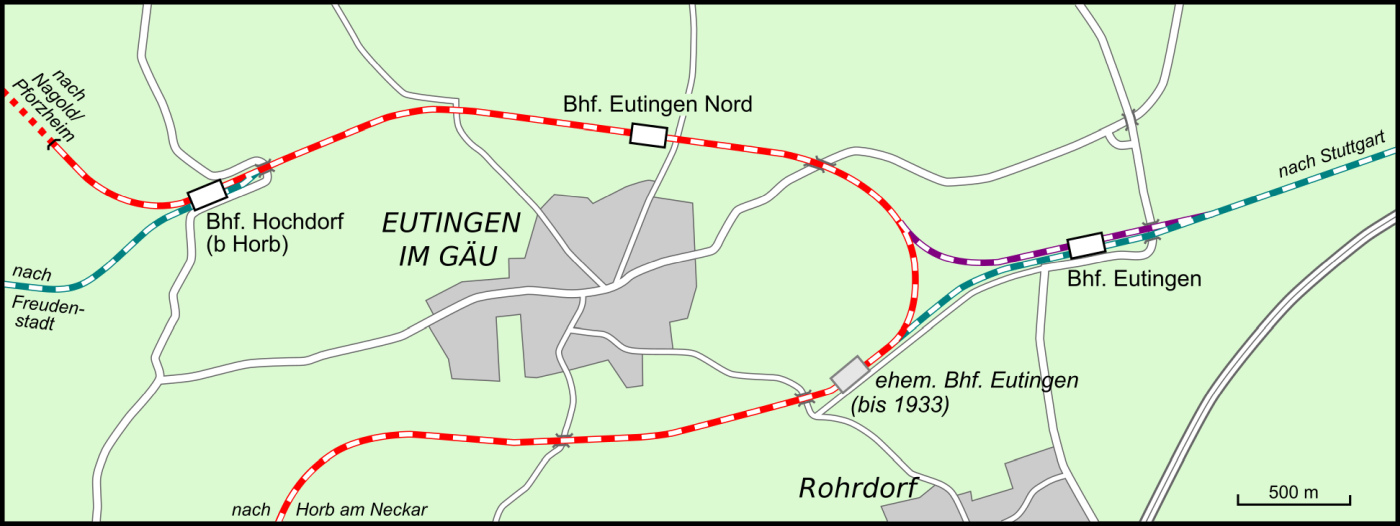
Plan of railway lines at Eutingen

In 1933, the Eutingen station was moved to its present location, about 3 kilometres (1.9 mi) from the centre of the town and not on the Nagold Valley Railway. In connection with the move, a wye was constructed between Hochdorf and the new Eutingen station so that trains between Stuttgart and Freudenstadt no longer needed to reverse directions as had previously been necessary at the old station. In addition, from then on, many Nagold Valley Railway trains ran to the new station at Eutingen instead of to Horb.

At the same time, double-track operation began between Hochdorf and Eutingen. Previously, the Nagold Valley Railway track had been used in one direction and the Gäu Railway in the other.

=== From the end of the Second World War to railway reform (1945–1993) ===
The bridge over the Enz was destroyed in the Second World War during the bombing of Pforzheim. Until it was rebuilt, the Pforzheim-Weißenstein station served as the northern terminus of the line. In 1948, the entire line could again be used. In the years which followed, numerous halts were closed as not economically viable; in some cases—for example Grunbach-Salmbach and Talmühle—their distance from large population centres was decisive.

The Nagold Valley Railway was also reduced in importance when the Calw depot station was downgraded to an annexe of the Pforzheim depot in October 1953, and then one and a half years after that ceased to be an official works. For almost two decades longer, it served as a parking and layover location for rolling stock; finally in the 1970s it was abandoned and demolished.

The previously two-track Hochdorf–Eutingen segment of the line was reduced to one track by 1985 by removal of one pair of rails. Since then, the Nagold Valley Railway and the Gäu Railway have shared a single track.

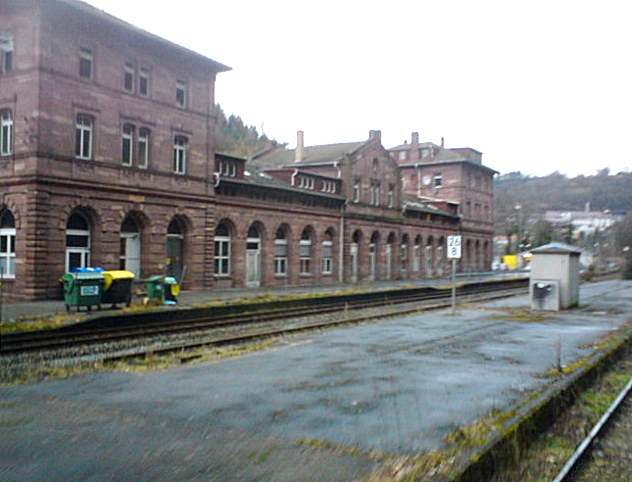
The old Calw station, abandoned in 1989.

First passenger and then goods traffic were discontinued on the Württemberg Black Forest Railway between Weil der Stadt and Calw, in 1983 and 1988 respectively, after which the Calw station lost its function as an interchange station; the narrow-gauge line to Altensteig which had originated at Nagold had already closed in 1967.

In 1989, so-called Signalisierte Zugleitbetrieb (signalised train operation) was introduced on the Nagold Valley Railway. Since then, operations at the Unterreichenbach, Bad Teinach, Wildberg and Nagold stations have been controlled remotely from Liebenzell. Among other things, the positioning of points, signals and barriers is determined from a central location. At Calw, simultaneously with the introduction of remote operation, the point where trains stopped was transferred to the newly erected central bus and train station. With the creation of this new transport hub at the centre of the locality, passenger use of the old station was discontinued.

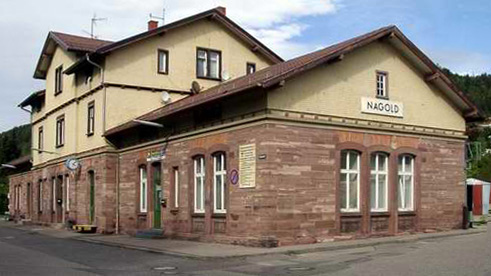
Nagold station, the only remaining goods loading/unloading point on the line

=== Deutsche Bahn (since 1993) ===
The Nagold Valley Railway was already of reduced importance in long-distance transport after the Second World War. In 1995, the remaining long-distance through coaches were withdrawn and since then the line has been used exclusively for local traffic. Since the neighbouring Enz Valley Railway was at the same time increasingly threatened with closure, the Albtal-Verkehrs-Gesellschaft (AVG—Alb Valley Transport Company) took over that line early in 2000 and instituted a lightrail operation as part of the Karlsruhe Stadtbahn at the end of 2002. This resulted in some improvements on the Enz Valley portion of the Nagold Valley Railway, in addition to electrification. Whereas previously the Enz and Nagold lines were two independent single tracks, the arrangement of the rails has now been changed so that the shared stretch to Pforzheim-Brötzingen is now dual-track and can be used by both. Additionally, the station where they diverge, Brötzingen, has been replaced by a new Brötzingen Mitte (central) station, which is in a better location with respect to that part of the town Pforzheim. Also, a new stop on both lines has been created at Pforzheim Maihälden, between the Pforzheim Hauptbahnhof (main station) and Brötzingen.

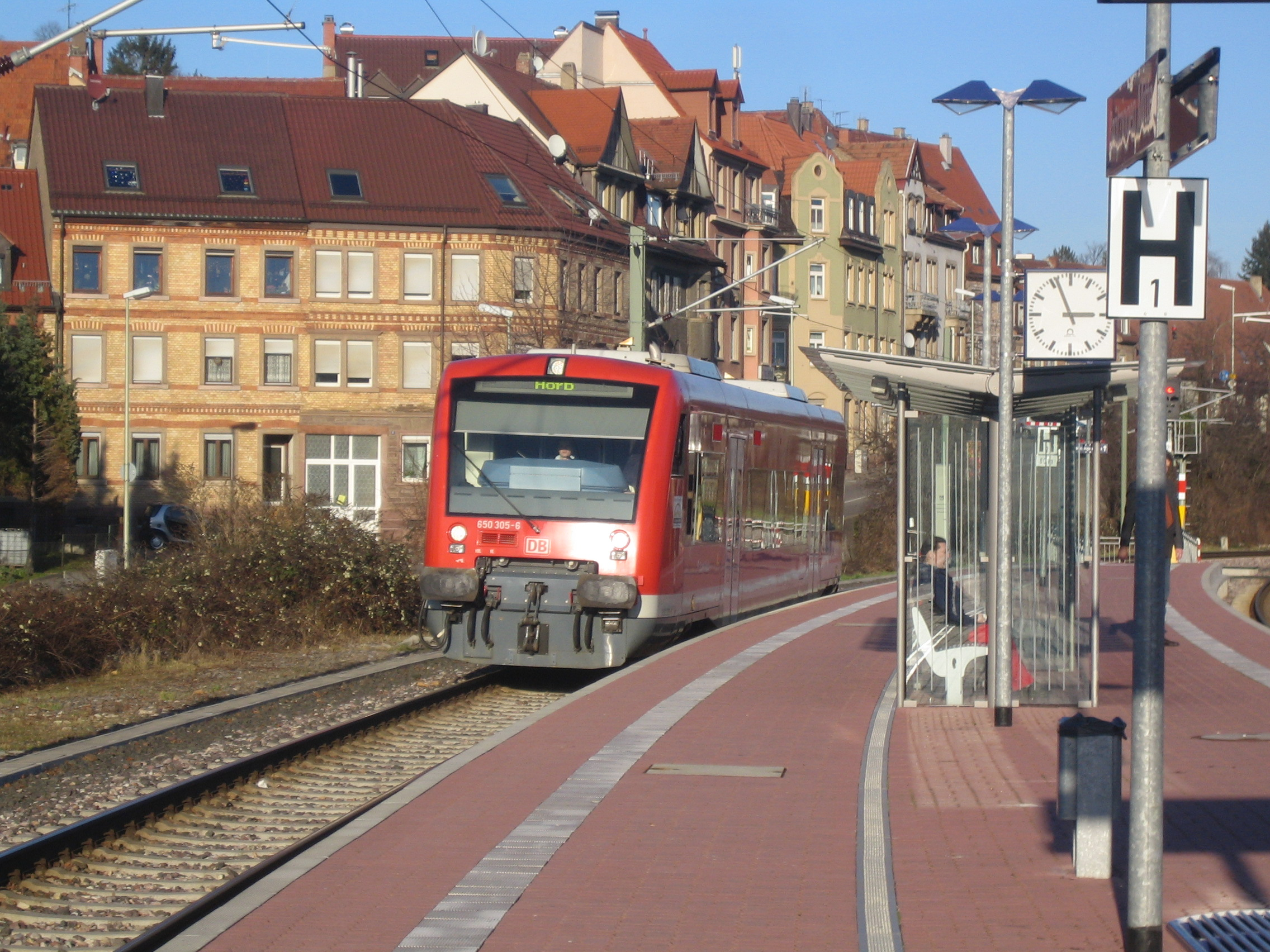
Train at the new Brötzingen-Mitte station, which replaced Brötzingen station in 2002

As part of the regionalisation of German railway lines, in late 2005 the Nagold Valley Railway line was taken over by the Deutsche Bahn subsidiary DB Regionalverkehr Alb-Bodensee. The latter promotes the railway line together with the Upper Neckar Railway line between Horb and Tübingen as a Kulturbahn ("cultural line"). This name appears on the Stadler Regio-Shuttle RS1 diesel railcars which have since been introduced. In the course of electrification of the Gäubahn, which runs alongside the Nagold Valley Railway between Hochdorf and Eutingen, the Nagold Valley line was also electrified late in 2006. This included the curve between Hochdorf and Horb, although it is used exclusively by diesel trains.

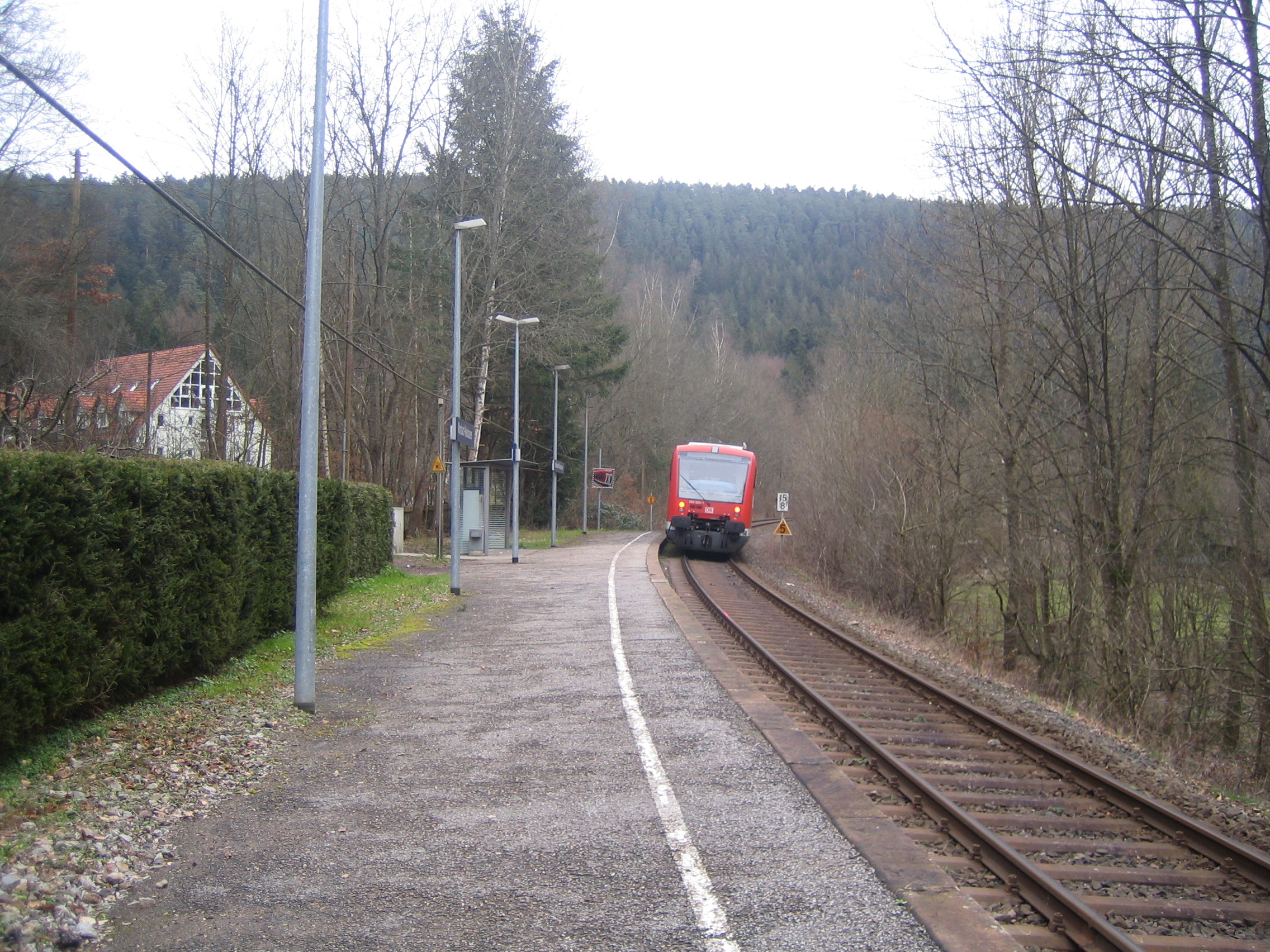
Train leaving the Monbach-Neuhausen request stop

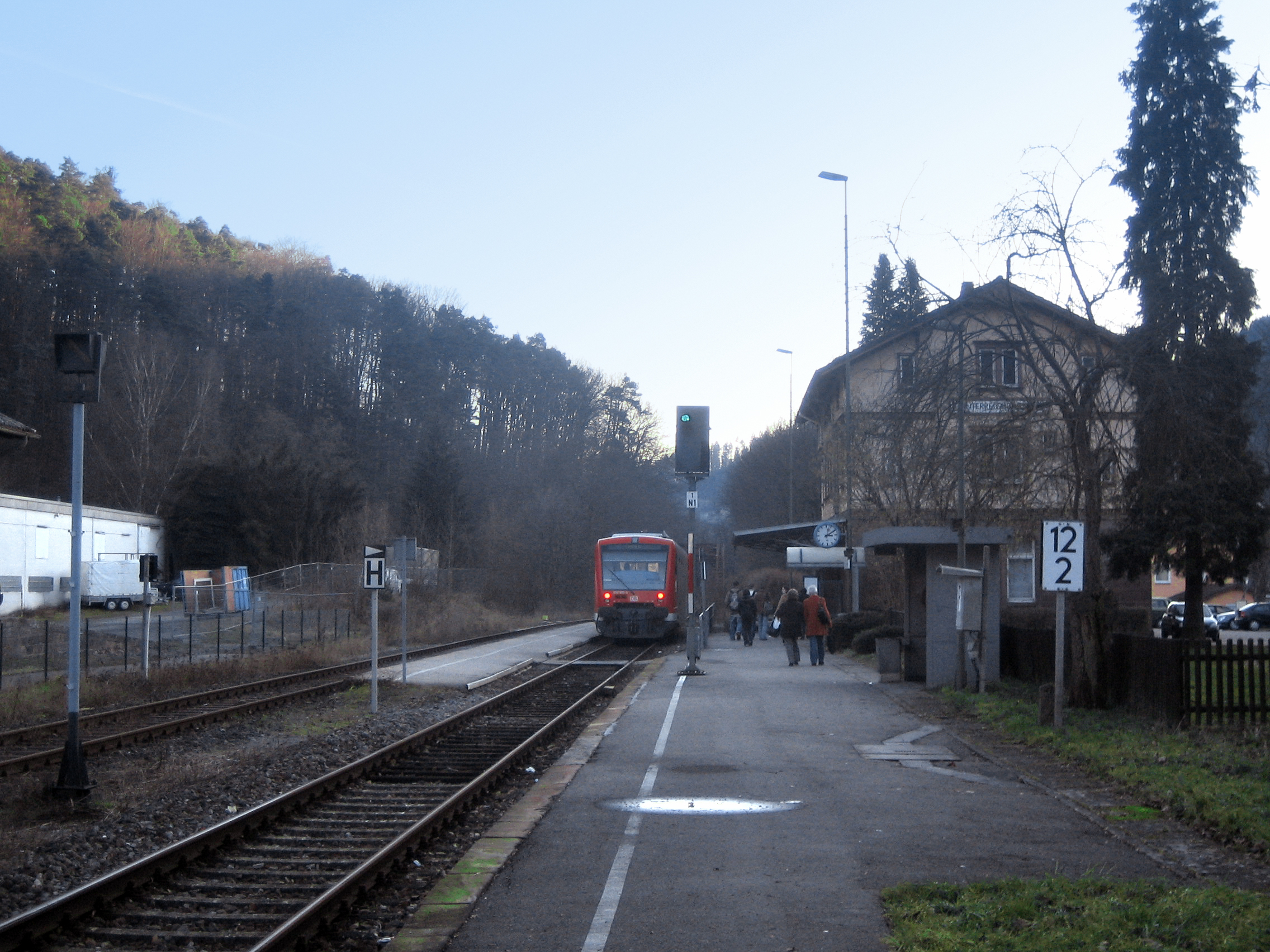
Train leaving Unterreichenbach station

With the timetable change on 14 December 2008, the Pforzheim-Weißenstein station reopened and once more became an interchange station. At the same time, a newly built halt was inaugurated at Nagold-Steinberg; until 14 June 2009, it was known as Nagold-Süd (south). The complete modernisation of the Nagold Valley Railway was completed for the timetable change on 11 December 2011, including the renovatation of platforms and raising them to a height of 55 cm, optimal for the railcars which are in use. In addition, stops at Nagold Mitte and Nagold-Iselshausen were opened at the same time, in preparation for the State Garden Exhibition in Nagold in 2012. A new halt called Pforzheim Durlacher Straße is planned between Pforzheim Hauptbahnhof and the Maihälden stop.
