= Wilferdingen-Singen station =

Railway station in Germany

Wilferdingen-Singen
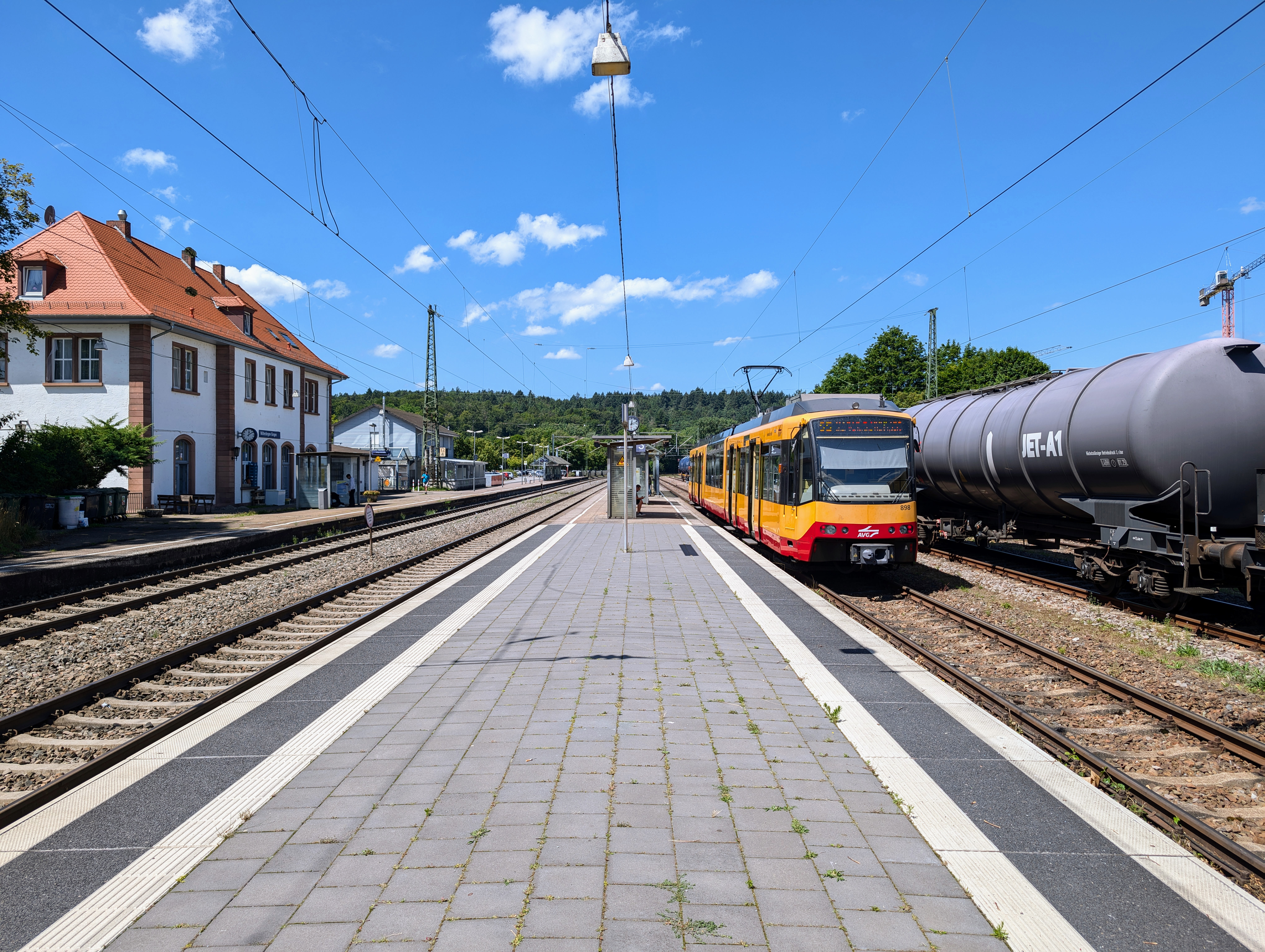
- 2024, platform 2 and 3

General information
- Location: Bahnhofstraße 7; 75196 Remchingen; Baden-Württemberg; Germany
- Coordinates: 48.9536°N 8.5727°E
- Elevation: 155 m (509 ft)
- System: Bf
- Owner: Deutsche Bahn
- Operator: DB Station&Service
- Lines: Karlsruhe–Mühlacker railway (KBS 770)
- Platforms: 1 island platform 1 side platform
- Tracks: 6
- Train operators: Go-Ahead Baden-Württemberg; Karlsruhe Stadtbahn
- Connections: S 5

Construction
- Parking: yes
- Cycle facilities: yes
- Accessible: partly

Other information
- Station code: 6769
- DS100 code: TWL
- IBNR: 8006440
- Category: 5
- Fare zone: KVV: 238 and 641; VPE: 41
- Website: www.bahnhof.de

History
- Opened: 1 January 1861; 165 years ago

Services
Preceding station		Following station
Karlsruhe-Durlach towards Karlsruhe Hbf	RE 1	Pforzheim Hbf towards Aalen Hbf
Preceding station	(Stuttgart)	Following station
Karlsruhe-Durlach towards Karlsruhe Hbf	MEX 17a	Pforzheim Hbf towards Stuttgart Hbf
Preceding station	Karlsruhe Stadtbahn	Following station
Kleinsteinbach station towards Wörth Badepark	S 5	Königsbach (Baden) station towards Pforzheim Hbf
Kleinsteinbach station towards Germersheim	S 51	Königsbach (Baden) station towards Söllingen or Pforzheim Hbf
Location
- Location within Baden-Württemberg Location within Germany Location within Europe

Wilferdingen-Singen station is a railway station in the Wilferdingen and Singen districts of the municipality of Remchingen, located in the Enzkreis district in Baden-Württemberg, Germany.

== History ==
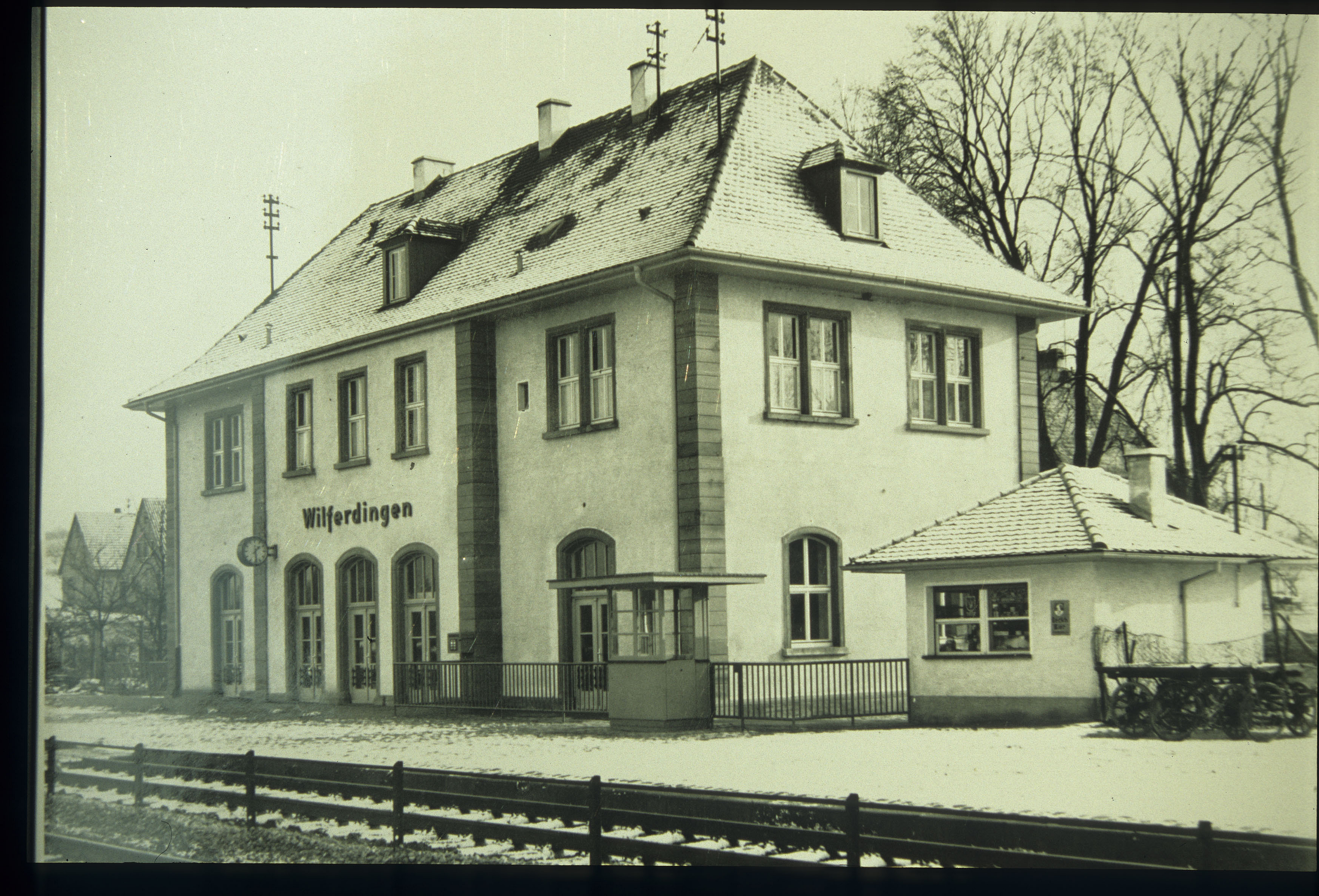
Station building in 1950

The station was opened in 1861. The railway line was actually supposed to lead via Nöttingen, but its residents resisted the connection to the railway. So the construction took place at today's location. The station, which was previously only called Wilferdingen, is now called Wilferdingen-Singen by Deutsche Bahn. The Karlsruher Verkehrsverbund, however, called them Remchingen until June 2019. Previously, the municipality tried to get Deutsche Bahn to rename the station to Remchingen for reasons of uniformity, which they refused for reasons of cost.

The station is currently (as of 2020) not barrier-free.

=== Reconstruction 2029 ===
In February 2022, Deutsche Bahn issued a tender for the planning of the station's reconstruction, resulting in a platform length of 212 m and a platform height of 76 cm above the top of the rails. Work on the platform extension began in April 2025. The station is scheduled to be fully accessible starting in 2029.

The platform adjacent to the station building (track 1) will be raised from 38 cm to 76 cm. 144 m of platform canopies will be constructed. The island platform (tracks 2/3) will be a combined platform with heights of 55 cm and 76 cm, a width of approximately 6 m, and an extended staircase (2.3 m). A 9 m walkway will connect the two sections. The kiosk building will be demolished, while the listed station building will remain untouched. Elevators will be installed on tracks 1 and 2/3, and a ramp will be built at the exit on Dajastraße in Singen. A noise barrier and three new waiting shelters will be built on track 1 towards Pforzheim.

Track 2 will be converted into a 740-meter passing loop. Track 3 will be connected to the main line. All tracks (including sidings 4–6) will be shifted slightly northward to allow for greater spacing. The overhead contact line system will be completely renewed. Eleven switches and the signal box will be completely replaced. These measures are part of the nationwide "740-meter network" program to promote long freight trains.

The reconstruction is scheduled to begin in early 2029 and be completed by the end of 2030.

== Station terrain ==
The Remchingen train station has a house platform on track 1 and a central platform on tracks 2 and 3. Three other tracks are used as overtaking and stowing tracks. The reception building is now used by restaurants and a model building association. There is a bus station, several hundred parking spaces and a taxi stand on the station forecourt. The station also has two-sided bicycle parking facilities, which are connected to one another via an underpass, as well as lockers.

== Rail services ==
Line	Route	Frequency
RE 1	Karlsruhe – Pforzheim – Mühlacker – Stuttgart – Aalen	60 mins
MEX 17a	Stuttgart – Pforzheim – Wilferdingen-Singen	5 trains
S 5S 51	Wörth am Rhein – Maxau – Knielingen – Lameyplatz – Entenfang – Yorckstraße – Marktplatz – Durlacher Tor – Tullastraße / VBK – Durlach – Grötzingen Oberausstraße – Pfinztal – Pforzheim	20/40 min cycle

== Gallery ==
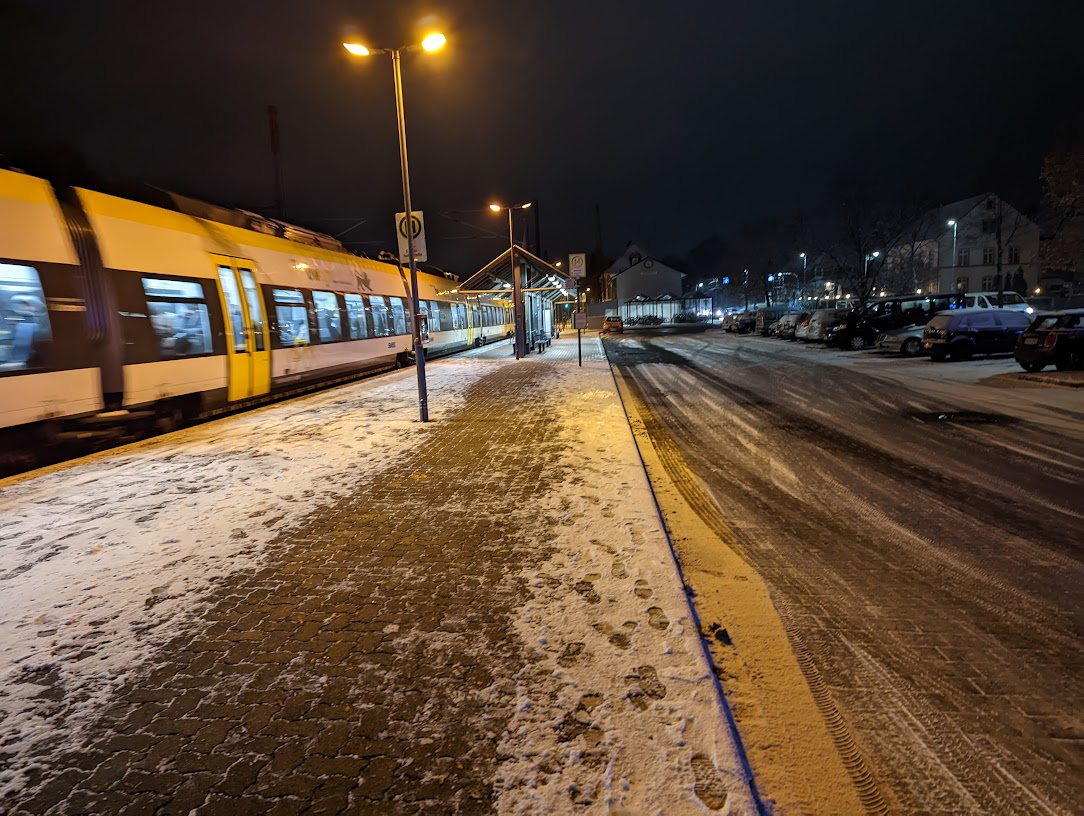

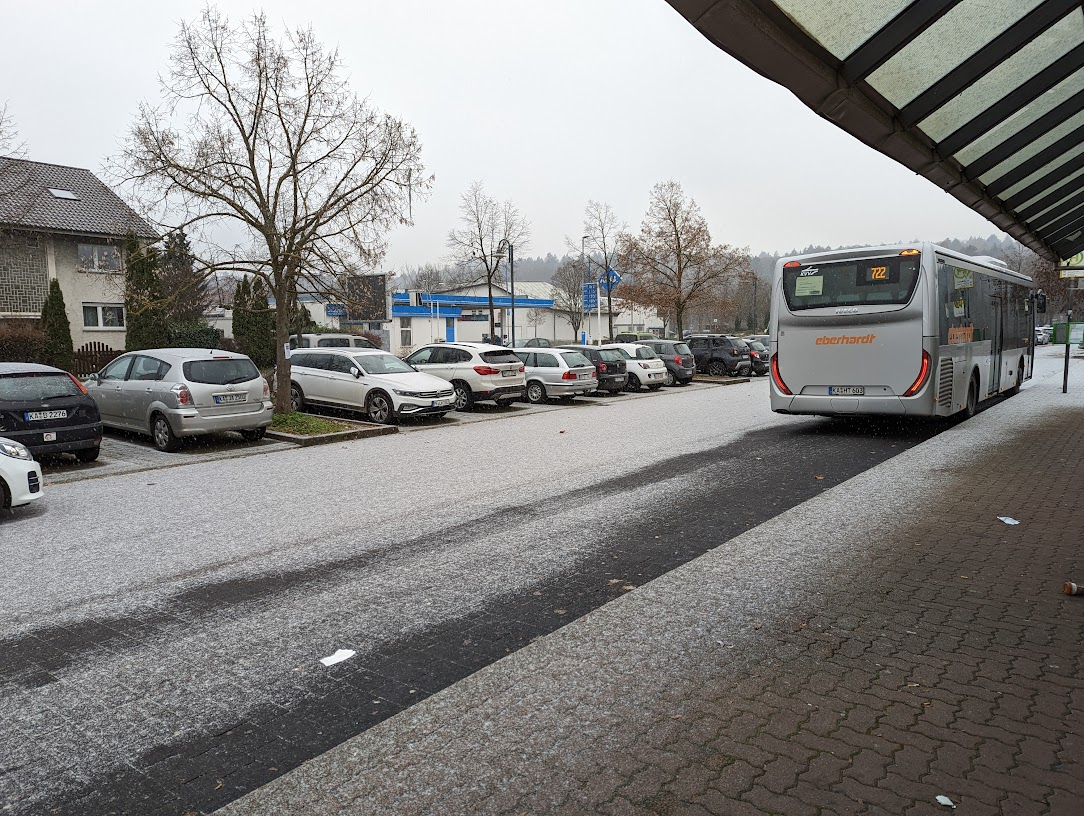

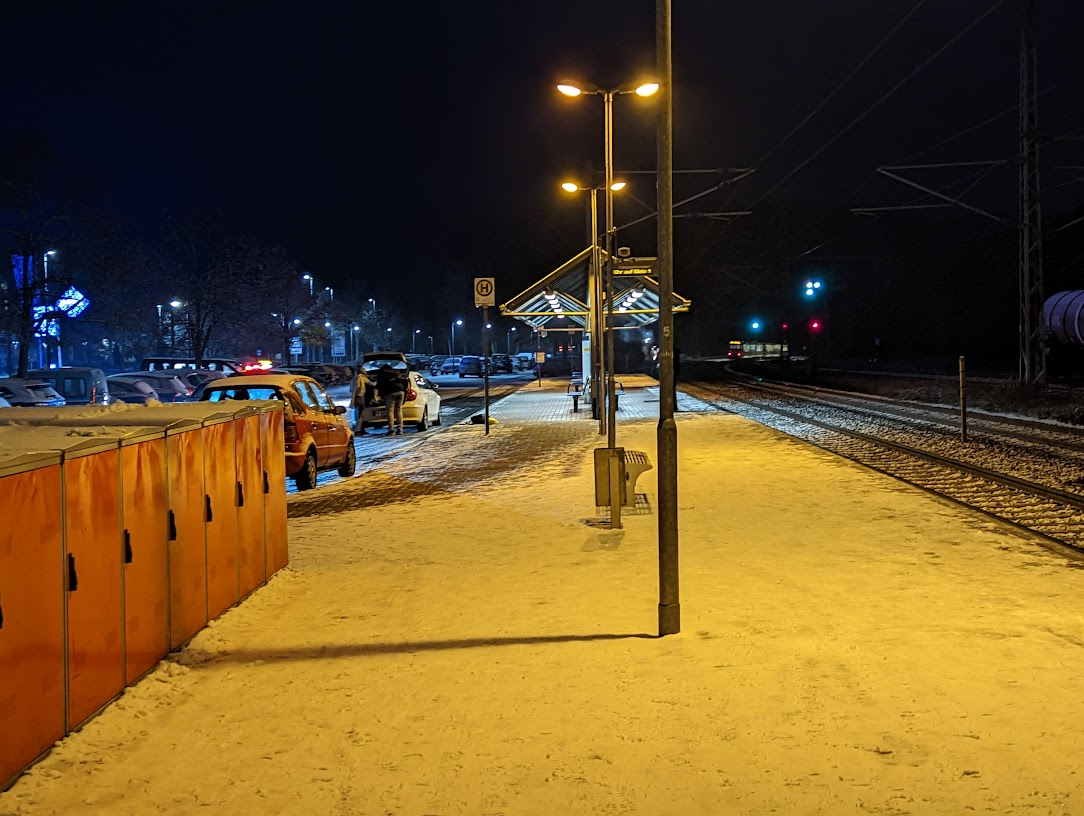

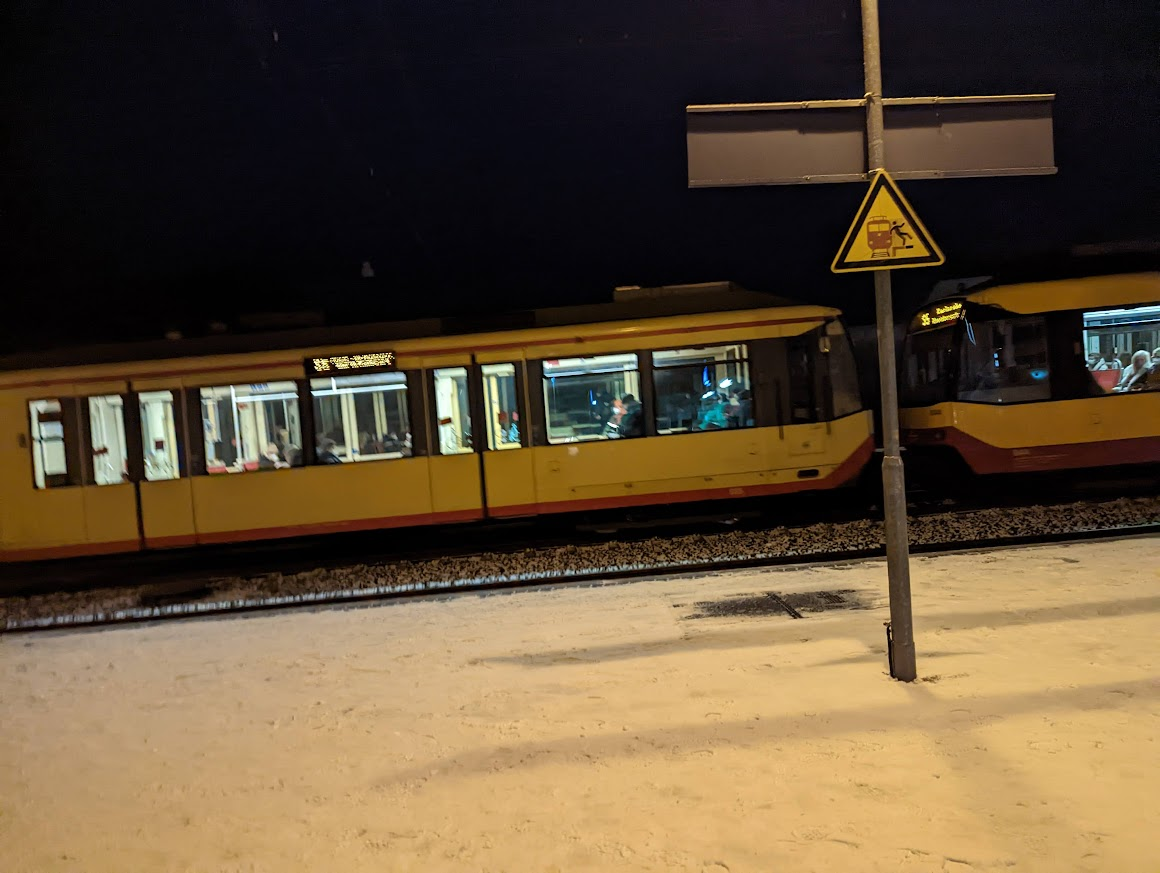

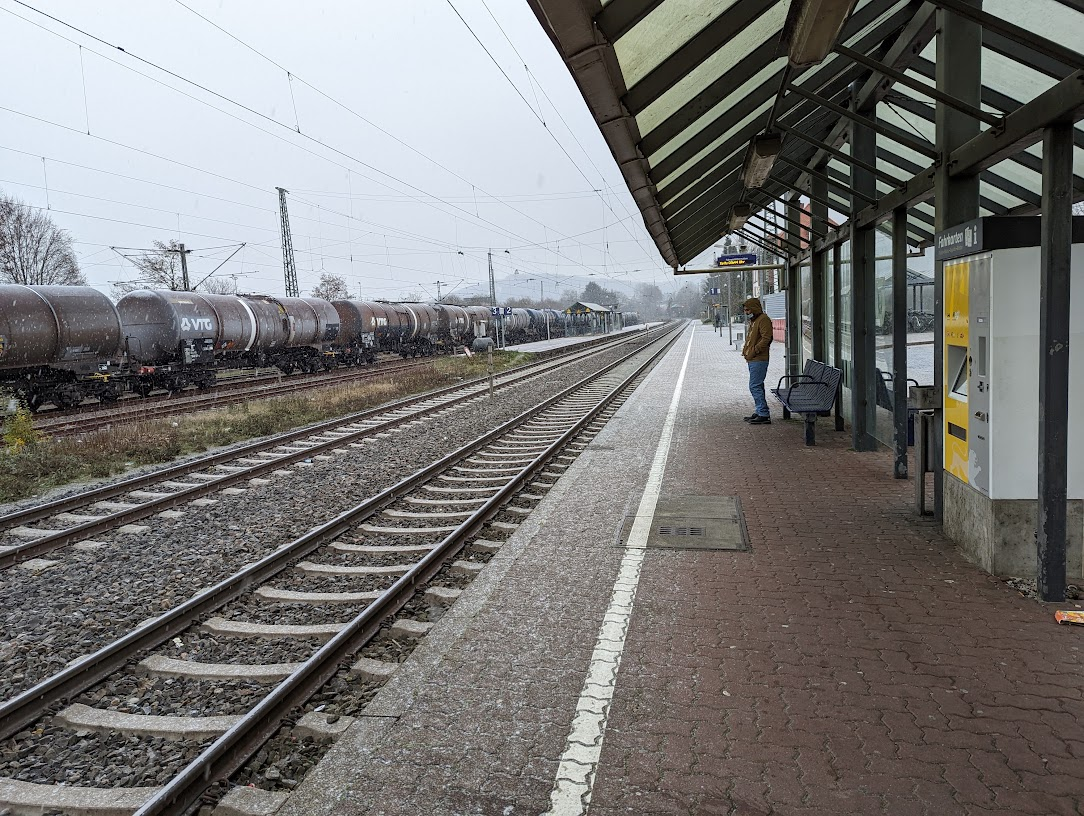
