= Sommerbergbahn =

Funicular railway in Germany

Coordinates: 48°45′00.65″N 8°32′39.07″E

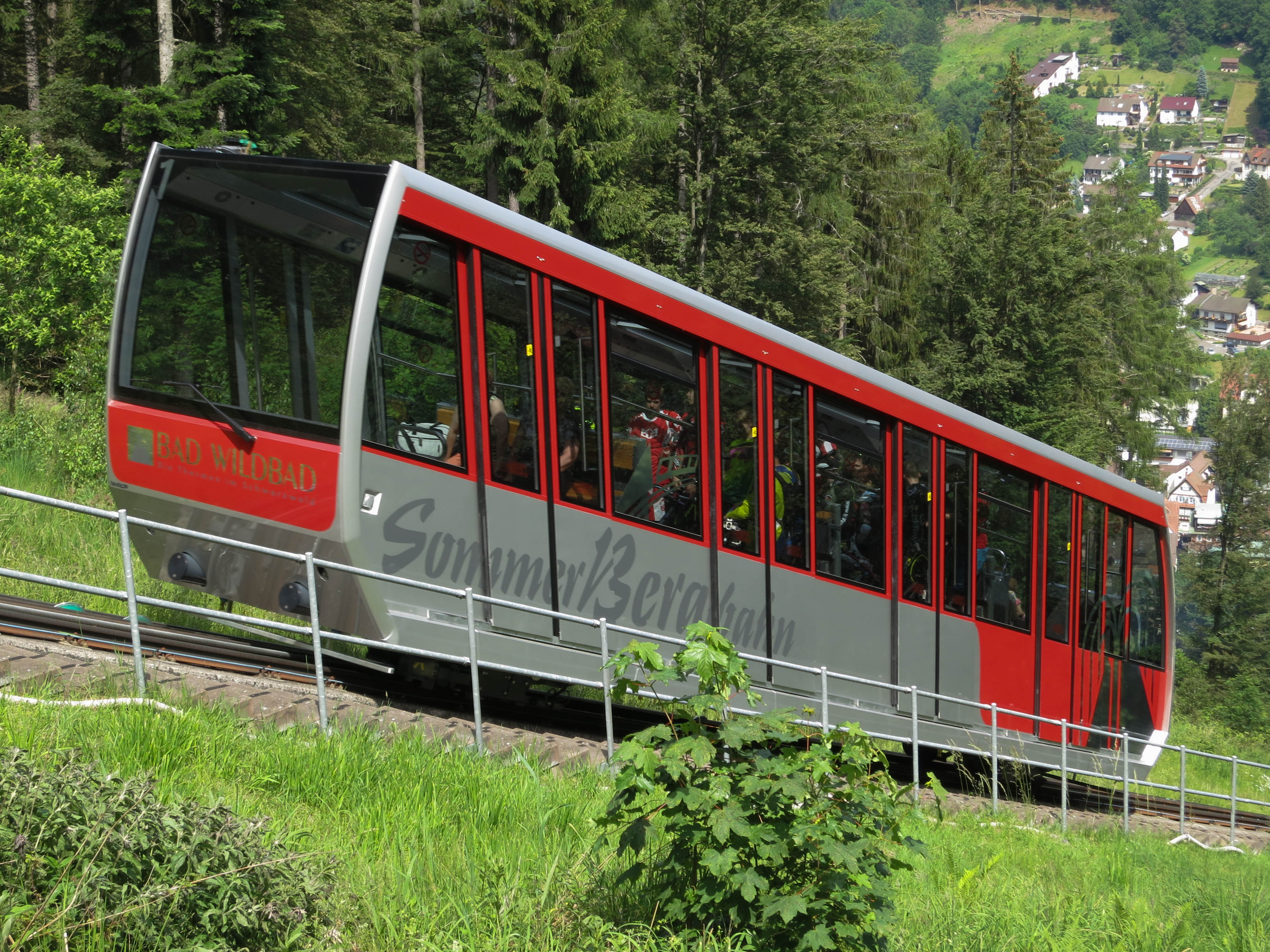
One of the new cars

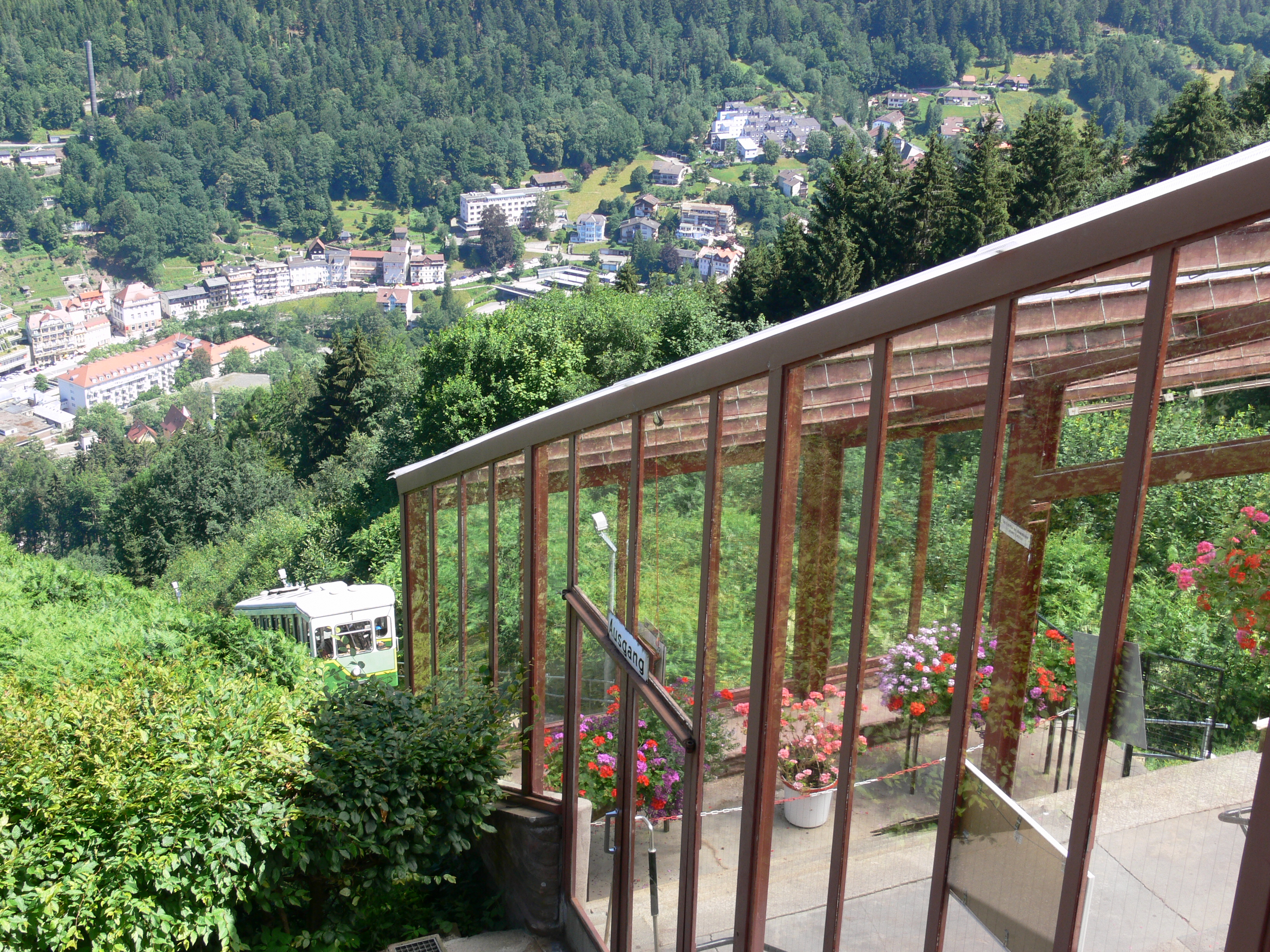
The funicular and town

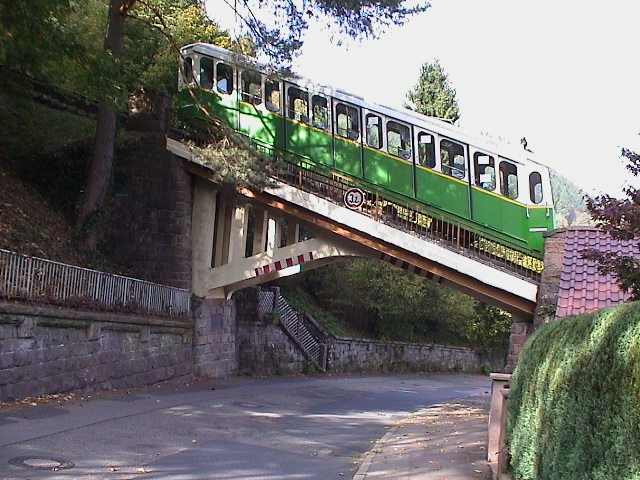
The funicular on the bridge over Baetznerstrasse

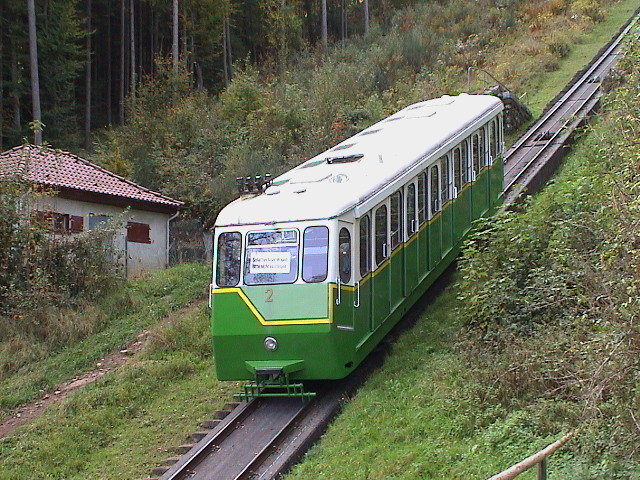
One of the cars

The Sommerbergbahn is a funicular railway in Baden-Württemberg, Germany. It runs from Bad Wildbad to the top of the Wildbader Sommerberg, which gives good views over the town, with one intermediate stop.

The Sommerbergbahn opened in 1908 and was modernised in 1928 and again in 1968. In 2004 extensive work was undertaken to bring it into line with modern safety requirements. The line was closed in late 2010 for major upgrade works, with one of the cars being lifted from the line in February 2011. The line is due to open again in late Summer 2011.

The Sommerbergbahn has the following technical parameters:

- Length: 756 metres (2,480 ft)
- Height: 324 metres (1,063 ft)
- Maximum Steepness: 53%
- Configuration: single track with passing loop
- Cars: 2
- Capacity: 100 passengers per car
- Journey time: 3.5 minutes
- Track gauge: 1,000 mm (3 ft 3 3/8 in)
- Traction: Electricity

Since 2002, the lower station of the Sommerbegbahn has been served by a stop on the tramway extension of line S6 of the Karlsruhe Stadtbahn, which connects Bad Wildbad to Pforzheim via the Enztalbahn.

== See also ==
- List of funicular railways

== Bibliography ==
1. Festschrift 50 Jahre Bergbahn zum Sommerberg, 1908–1958, Druckerei Eisele, Mai 1958
2. Götz Bechtle: 100 Jahre Sommerbergbahn in Bad Wildbad; S. 75-89 in Ein Jahrbuch, Band 26, 2008, Herausgeber: Landkreis Calw, ISBN 978-3-9812679-0-7
3. Götz Bechtle: Festbroschüre 100 Jahre SommerBergbahn Bad Wildbad 1908-2008, Herausgeber Stadtwerke Wildbad 2008, erhältlich bei Touristik Bad Wildbad GmbH
