= Neulingen =

German municipality

- Municipality
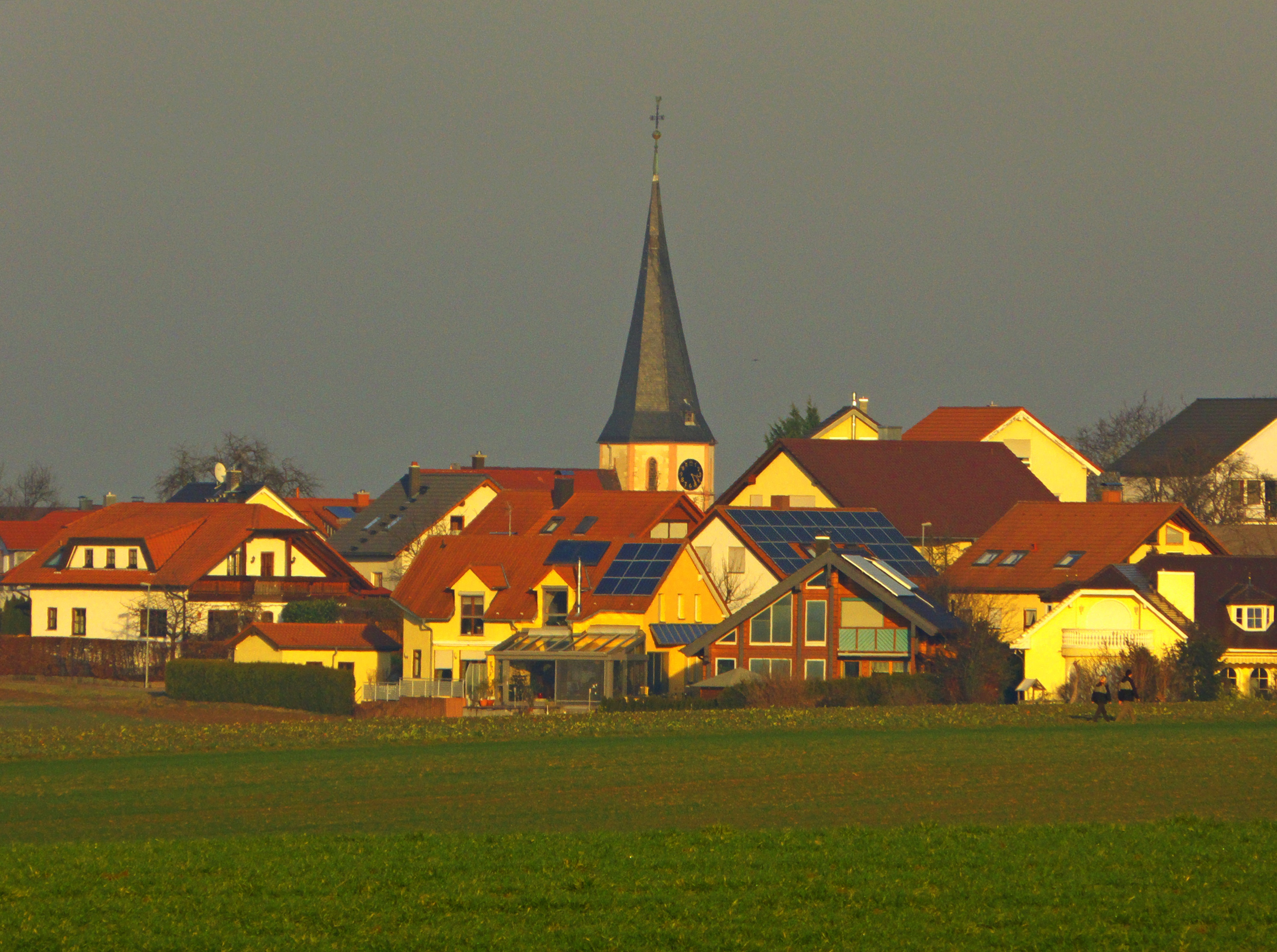
- Göbrichen

- Coat of arms

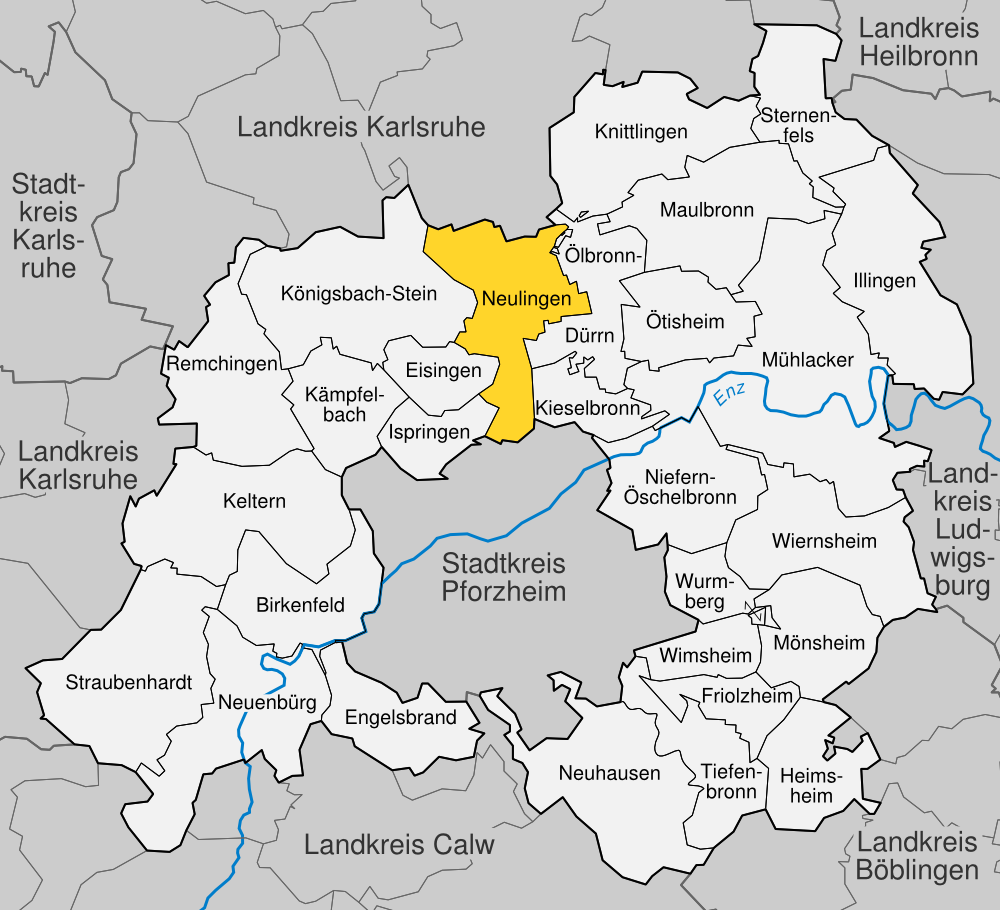
- Location of Neulingen within Enzkreis district
- Interactive map of Neulingen
- Location within Germany Location within Baden-Württemberg
- Coordinates: 48°58′6″N 8°43′29″E
- Country: Germany
- State: Baden-Württemberg
- Admin. region: Karlsruhe
- District: Enzkreis

Government
  - Mayor (2022–30): Michael Schmidt

Area
  - Total: 23.19 km^{2} (8.95 sq mi)
- Elevation: 325 m (1,066 ft)

Population (2025-12-31)
  - Total: 6,555
  - Density: 282.7/km^{2} (732.1/sq mi)
- Time zone: UTC+01:00 (CET)
  - Summer (DST): UTC+02:00 (CEST)
- Postal codes: 75245
- Dialling codes: 07237
- Vehicle registration: PF (Enzkreis)
- Website: www.neulingen.de

Neulingen (German pronunciation: [ˈnɔʏlɪŋən]) is a municipality in the Enz district in Baden-Württemberg in Germany. It was created on 1 January 1974 from the three independent villages of Bauschlott, Göbrichen, and Nußbaum. It is located on the Bertha Benz Memorial Route.

== History ==
Bauschlott and Göbrichen were long-time possessions of the Margraviate and later Grand Duchy of Baden, but Nußbaum belonged to first Herrenalb Abbey and then the Kingdom of Württemberg until being ceded to Baden by treaty on 17 October 1806. Upon annexation, Nußbaum joined the other two towns in the district of Stein. The three were reassigned on 25 May 1821 to the district of Pforzheim, which became Landkreis Pforzheim on 25 June 1939. On 1 January 1973, as part of the 1973 Baden-Württemberg district reform, the Enz district was created and Bauschlott, Nußbaum, and Göbrichen were assigned to it. The next year, the three towns merged to form the municipality of Neulingen. The latter town changed its name to Neulingen, after a nearby village named neither Nidlingen or Neidlingen that had ceased to exist in the 14th century.

== Geography ==
The municipality (Gemeinde) of Neulingen covers 23.19 square kilometers (8.95 mi^{2}) of the Enz district of Baden-Württemberg, a state of the Federal Republic of Germany. It is located entirely within the Kraichgau, specifically on the Bauschlotter Plateau, and so its geography is made up by the region's characteristic loess-coated, forested and karstified hills of muschelkalk. Elevation above sea level within the municipal area varies from a low of 232 meters (761 ft) Normalnull (NN) to a high of 365 meters (1,198 ft) NN.

=== Nature reserves ===
The Bauschlotter Schlosspark, Neulingen sinkholes, and Bauschlotter Au Federally-protected nature reserves are located within Neulingen's municipal area.

== Demographics ==
Population development:

| Year | Inhabitants |
|---|---|
| 1990 | 5,116 |
| 2001 | 6,420 |
| 2011 | 6,559 |
| 2021 | 6,670 |

== Coat of arms ==
Neulingen's municipal coat of arms displays a field of red crossed by a diagonal gold bar, a reference to the House of Zähringen, who ruled the Margraviate and later Grand Duchy of Baden, though the tincture is inverted. The items on this pattern are references to the three towns that merged to form Neulingen. The two black diamonds inside the bar are from Nußbaum, while the golden 'G' above it and the sester below it are from Göbrichen and Bauschlott respectively. The municipal coat of arms was approved by the Enz district office on 15 June 1984.
