= Viktoria Berghausen =

German football club

- Full name: Fußball-Club Viktoria e.V. 1906 Berghausen
- Founded: 1906
- Ground: An der Brunnenstraße
- Capacity: 4,000
- League: Kreisliga Karlsruhe (VIII)
- 2015–16: 7th
Home colours	Away colours

Viktoria Berghausen is a German association football club from the town of Berghausen, Baden-Württemberg.

== History ==
Established in 1906 as FC Germania Berghausen the club quickly failed, but was reformed in July 1906 as Viktoria. They played their first match against Frankonia Durlach losing 6:0.

Through most of the 1960s the team was a lower-tier side in the Amateurliga Nordbaden (III) until being relegated to the 2. Amateurliga Nordbaden Mitte in 1970. Nowadays the club plays in the Kreisliga Karlsruhe.
