= Pfinztal =

- Municipality
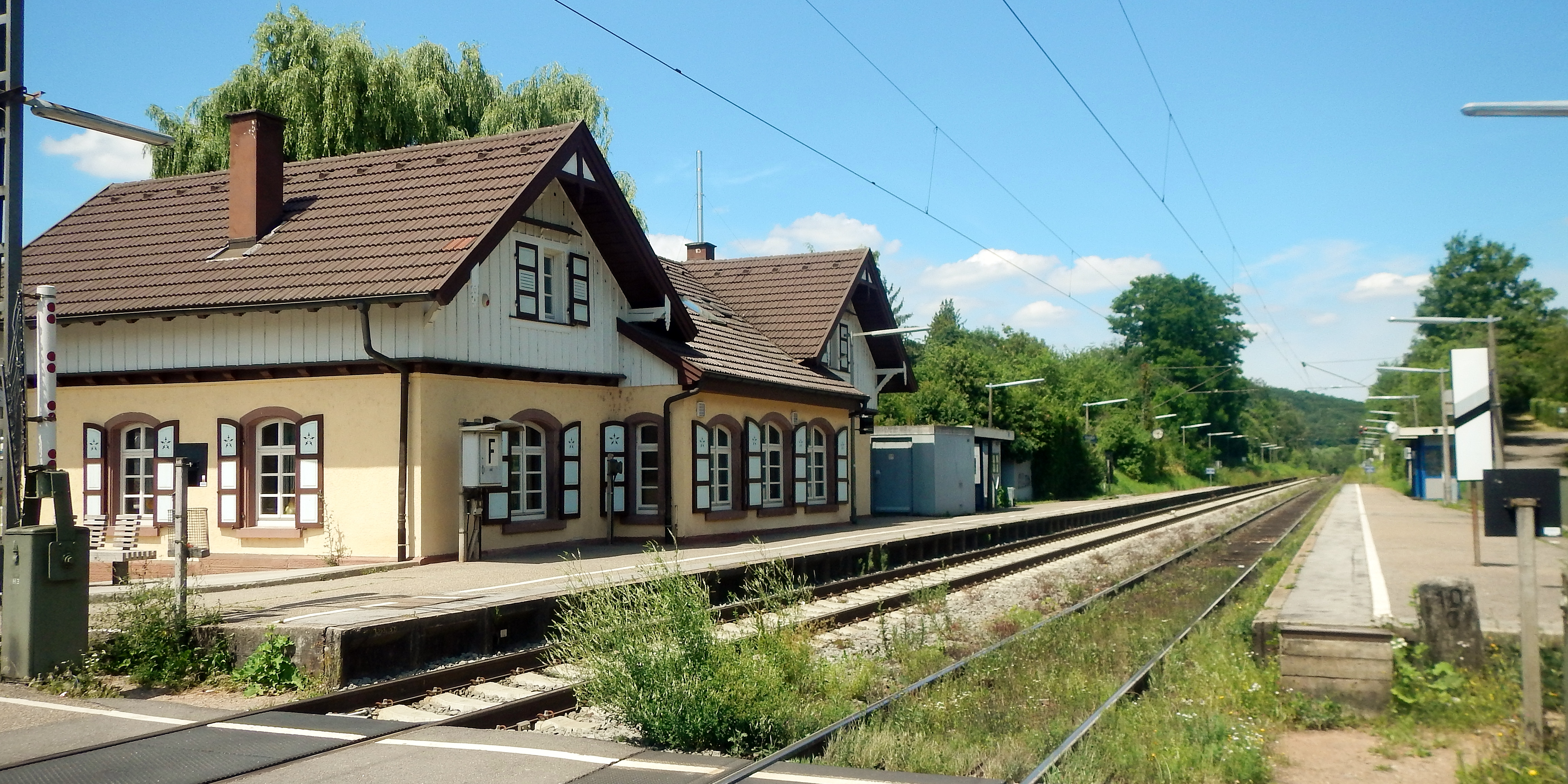
- One small Railway station in Pfinztal

- Coat of arms

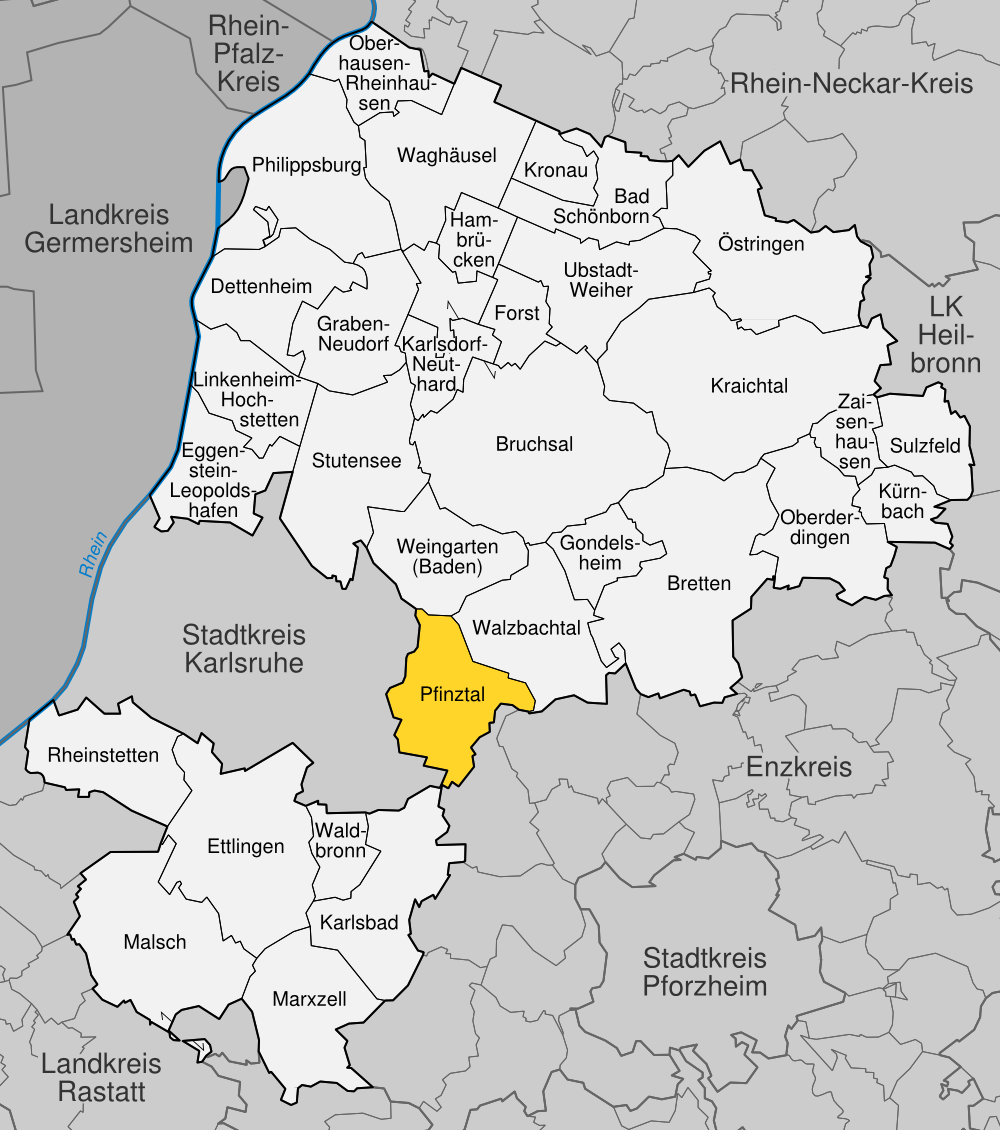
- Location of Pfinztal within Karlsruhe district
- Interactive map of Pfinztal
- Location within Germany Location within Baden-Württemberg
- Coordinates: 48°59′16″N 08°32′36″E
- Country: Germany
- State: Baden-Württemberg
- Admin. region: Karlsruhe
- District: Karlsruhe

Government
  - Mayor (2019–27): Nicola Bodner

Area
  - Total: 31.05 km^{2} (11.99 sq mi)
- Elevation: 151 m (495 ft)

Population (2025-12-31)
  - Total: 18,291
  - Density: 589.1/km^{2} (1,526/sq mi)
- Time zone: UTC+01:00 (CET)
  - Summer (DST): UTC+02:00 (CEST)
- Postal codes: 76327
- Dialling codes: 0721, 07240
- Vehicle registration: KA
- Website: www.pfinztal.de

Pfinztal is a municipality in the district Karlsruhe, Baden-Württemberg, Germany. Its municipality consists of the villages Wöschbach, Berghausen, Söllingen and Kleinsteinbach, which were merged to one municipality in 1974.

Pfinztal is located on Bertha Benz Memorial Route.

== Sports ==
- Viktoria Berghausen (1906), German association football club

== Twin towns – sister cities ==
Pfinztal is twinned with:

- Rokycany, Czech Republic
- Vijfheerenlanden, Netherlands (formerly with Leerdam)
