= Weingarten (Baden) =

- Municipality
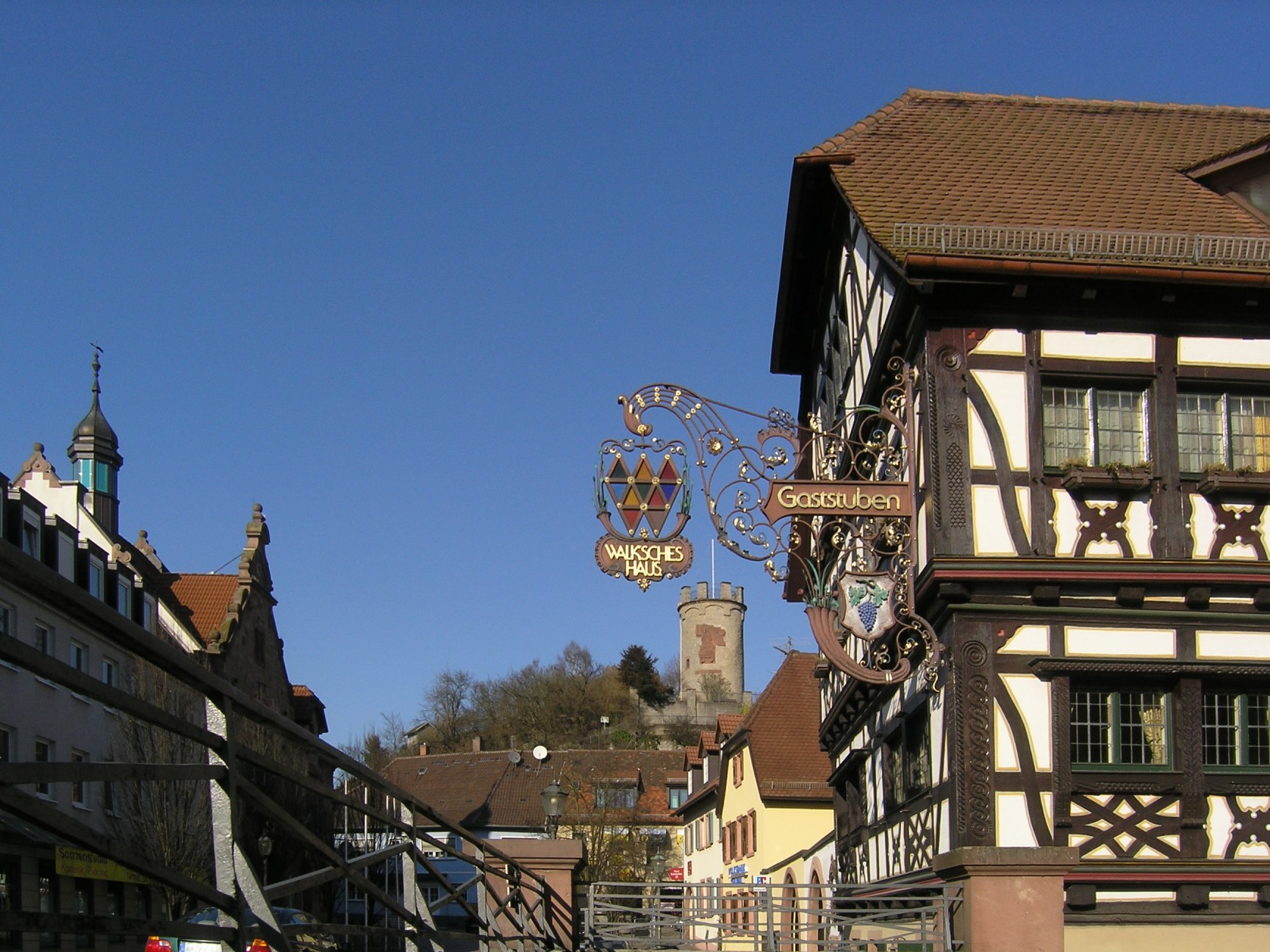

- Coat of arms

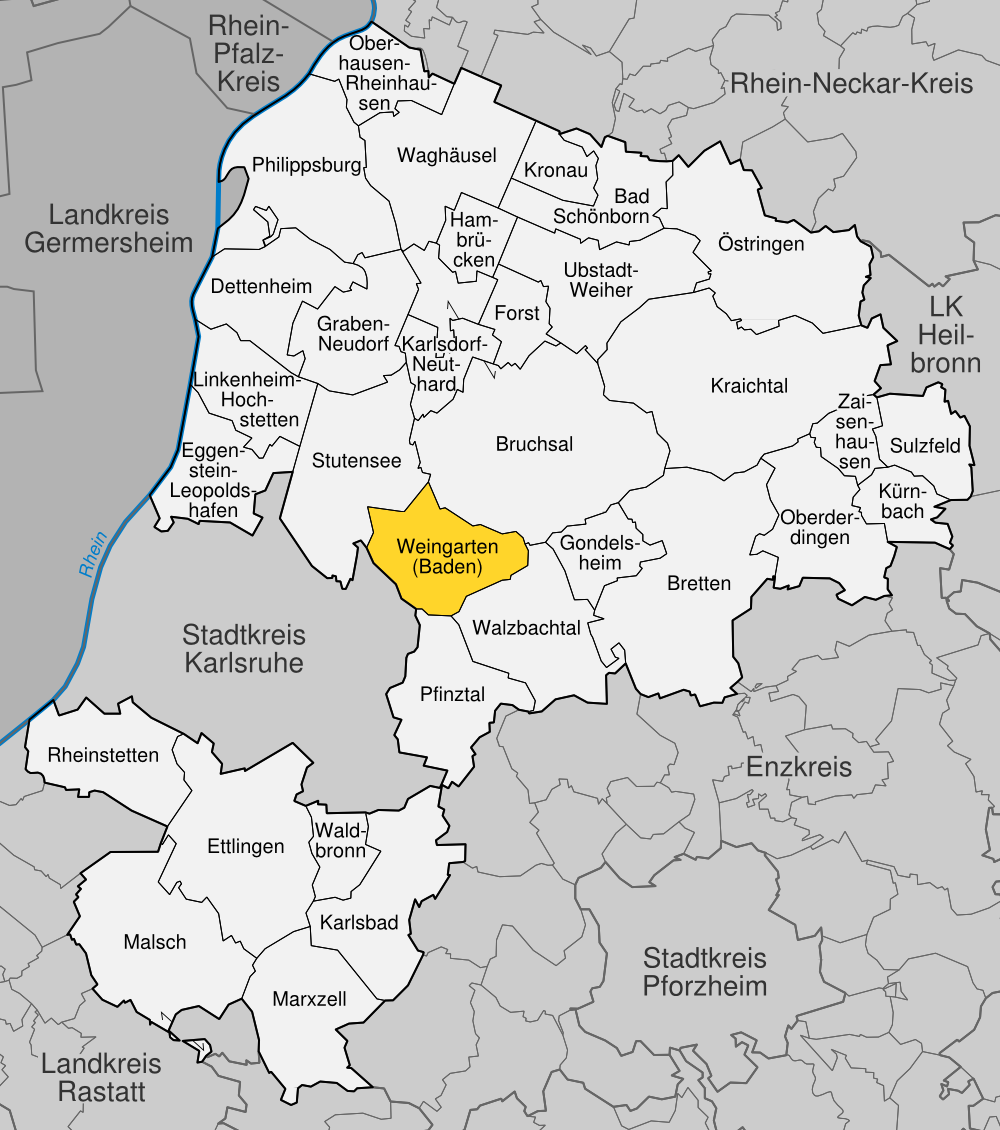
- Location of Weingarten within Karlsruhe district
- Interactive map of Weingarten
- Location within Germany Location within Baden-Württemberg
- Coordinates: 49°3′5″N 8°31′50″E
- Country: Germany
- State: Baden-Württemberg
- Admin. region: Karlsruhe
- District: Karlsruhe

Government
  - Mayor (2018–26): Eric Bänziger

Area
  - Total: 29.38 km^{2} (11.34 sq mi)
- Elevation: 144 m (472 ft)

Population (2025-12-31)
  - Total: 10,582
  - Density: 360.2/km^{2} (932.9/sq mi)
- Time zone: UTC+01:00 (CET)
  - Summer (DST): UTC+02:00 (CEST)
- Postal codes: 76356
- Dialling codes: 07244
- Vehicle registration: KA
- Website: www.weingarten-baden.de

Weingarten (Baden) (German pronunciation: [ˈvaɪnɡaʁtn̩]) is a municipality in the district of Karlsruhe in southwestern Germany, situated at the transition from the Kraichgau to the Rhine valley. Its name means wine garden in German. Weingarten is located on the Bertha Benz Memorial Route.

While remains of a settlement from Roman or earlier times have been found nearby, the village itself developed from a farm belonging to the Wissembourg monastery in Northern Alsace; 985 is considered to be the village's founding year. Until 1803, Weingarten belonged to the Electorate of the Palatinate; in the course of the Napoleonic Wars it became part of the Grand Duchy of Baden.

The population is about two thirds Protestant, one third Catholic. The village is connected by Bundesstraße (federal road) B 3 and the railroad Frankfurt am Main-Basel. Close by is the Bundesautobahn (motorway) A 5 for the Karlsruhe-Frankfurt am Main route.

The village has its own elementary and secondary school; additional schools are in the neighbouring cities of Karlsruhe, Bruchsal, and Stutensee.

The village's main industries are wine and fruit production, gastronomy, and wood, chemical, and metal production.

For recreation, there are sports fields, an indoor swimming pool, a recreational lake, and the nature reserve Weingartener Moor. Also part of the municipality are the settlements Sallenbusch and Sohl in the Kraichgau hills, and Waldbrücke on the plain. The settlement of Sallenbusch was founded in June 1951 and constructed with the aid of U.S. soldiers. The first settlers arrived in July 1952.

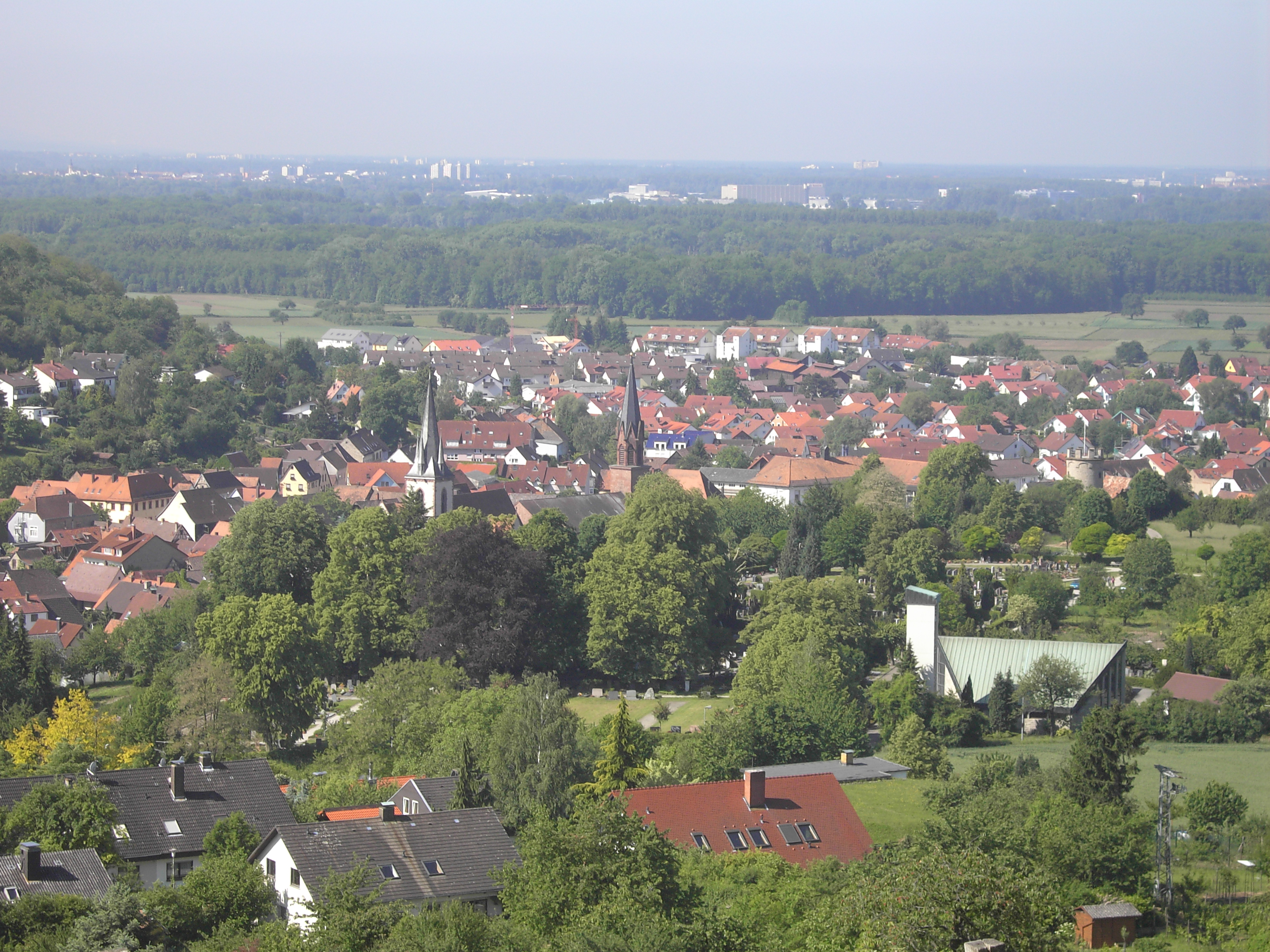
View from the hills

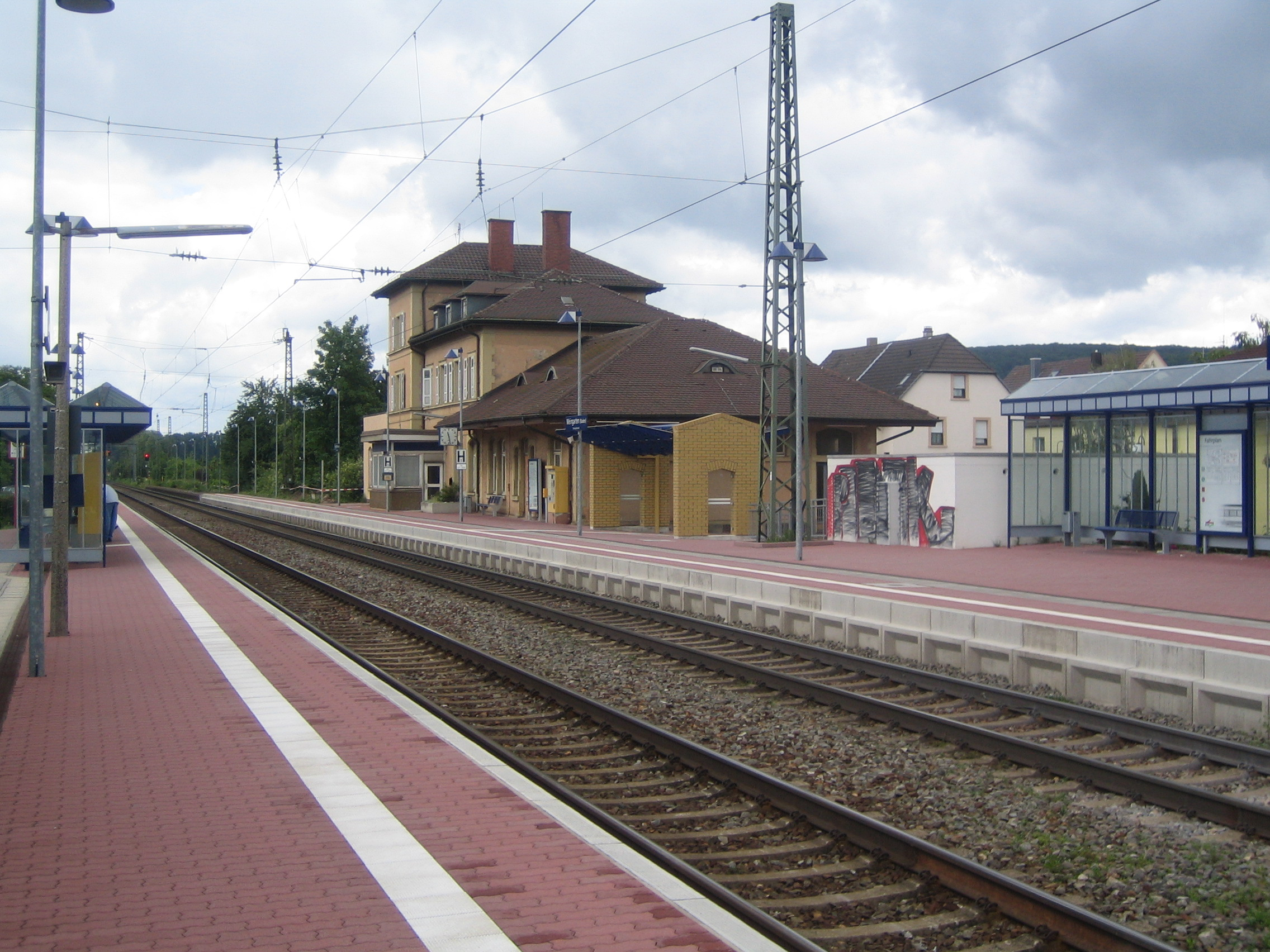
Railway station

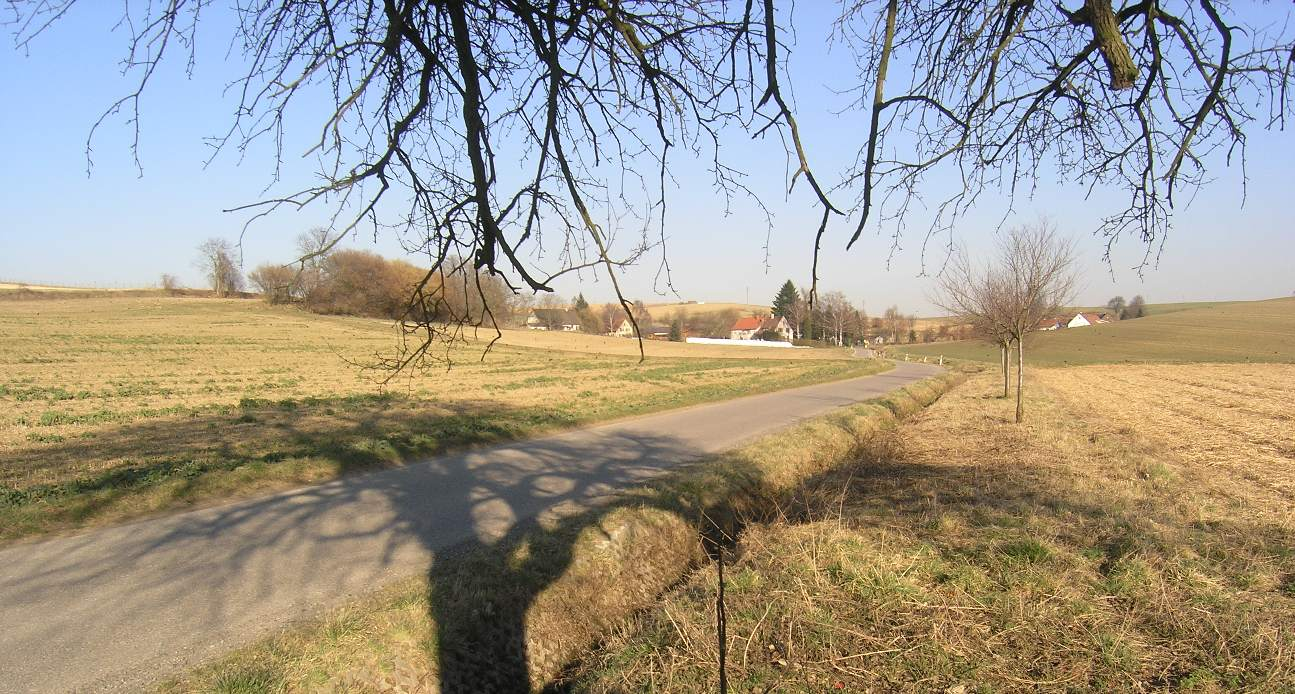
Sallenbusch

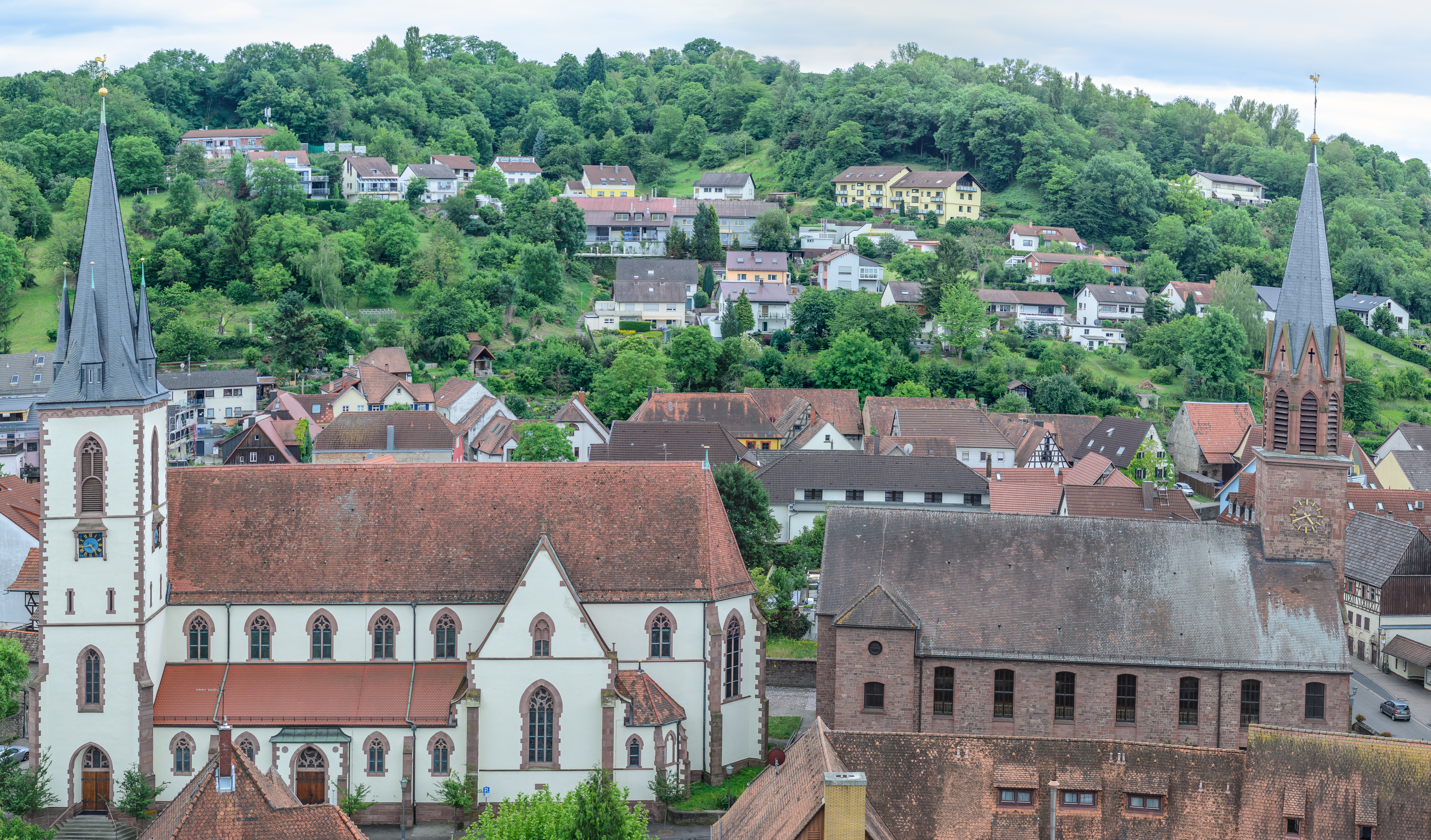
Catholic (left) and Lutheran (right) churches

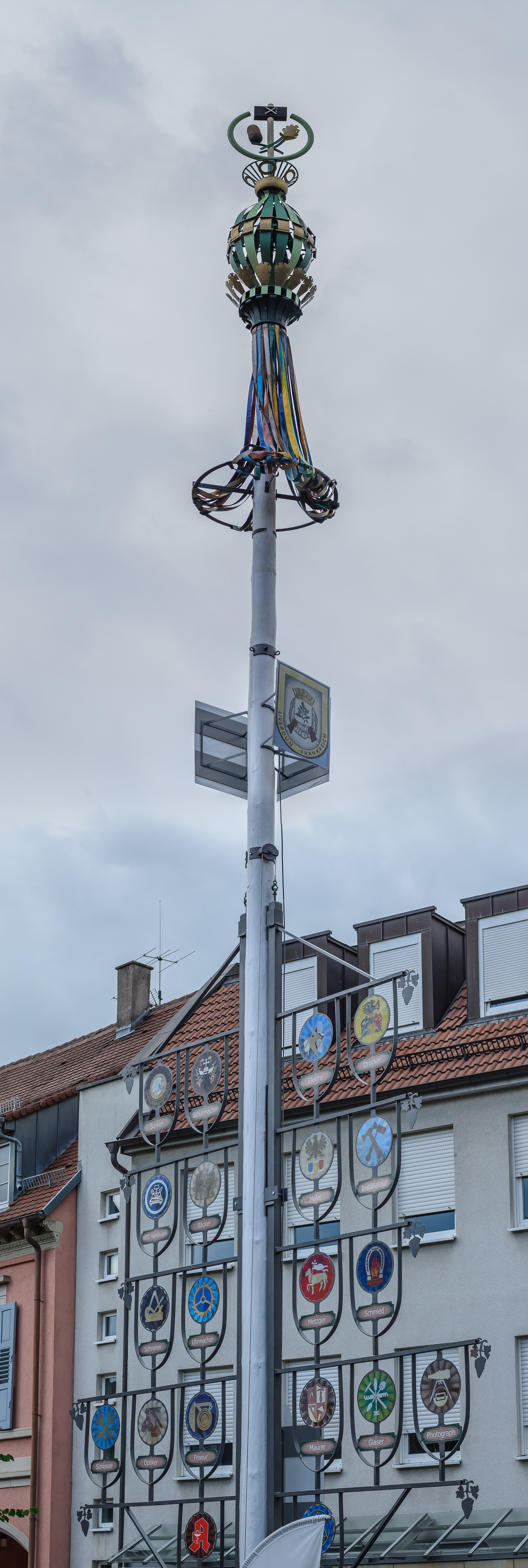
Maypole

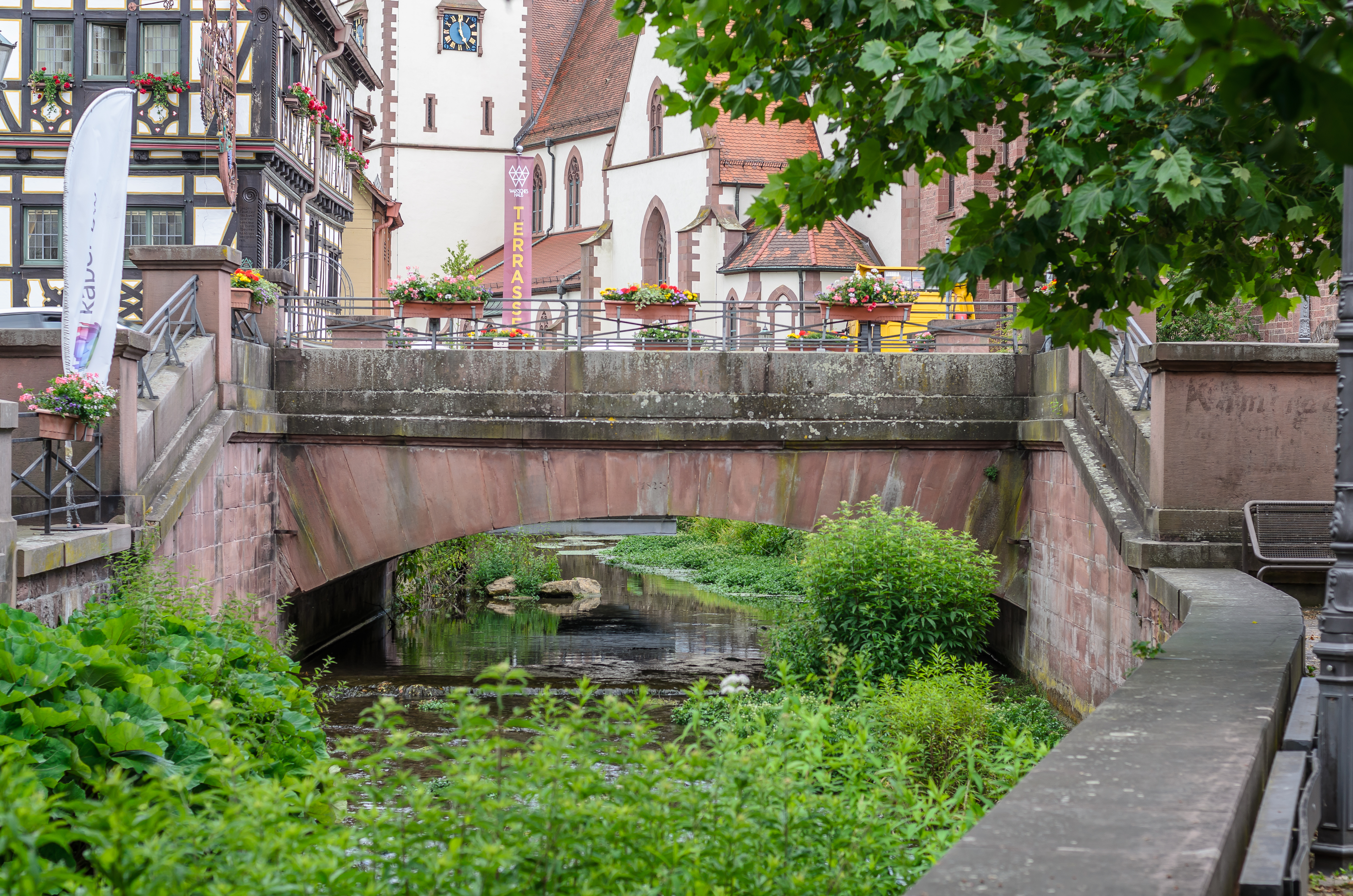
Walzbach

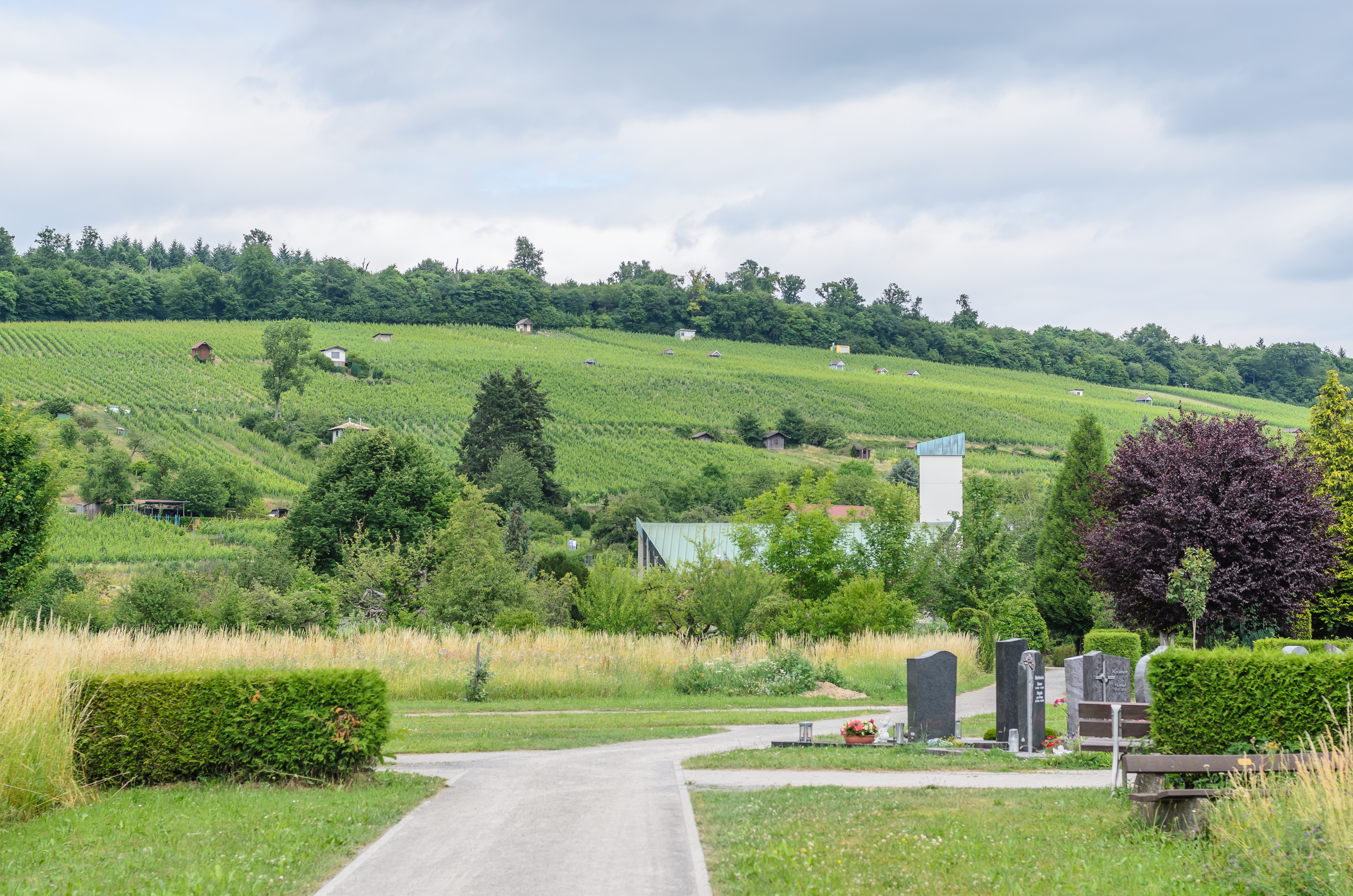
Vineyards and cemetery

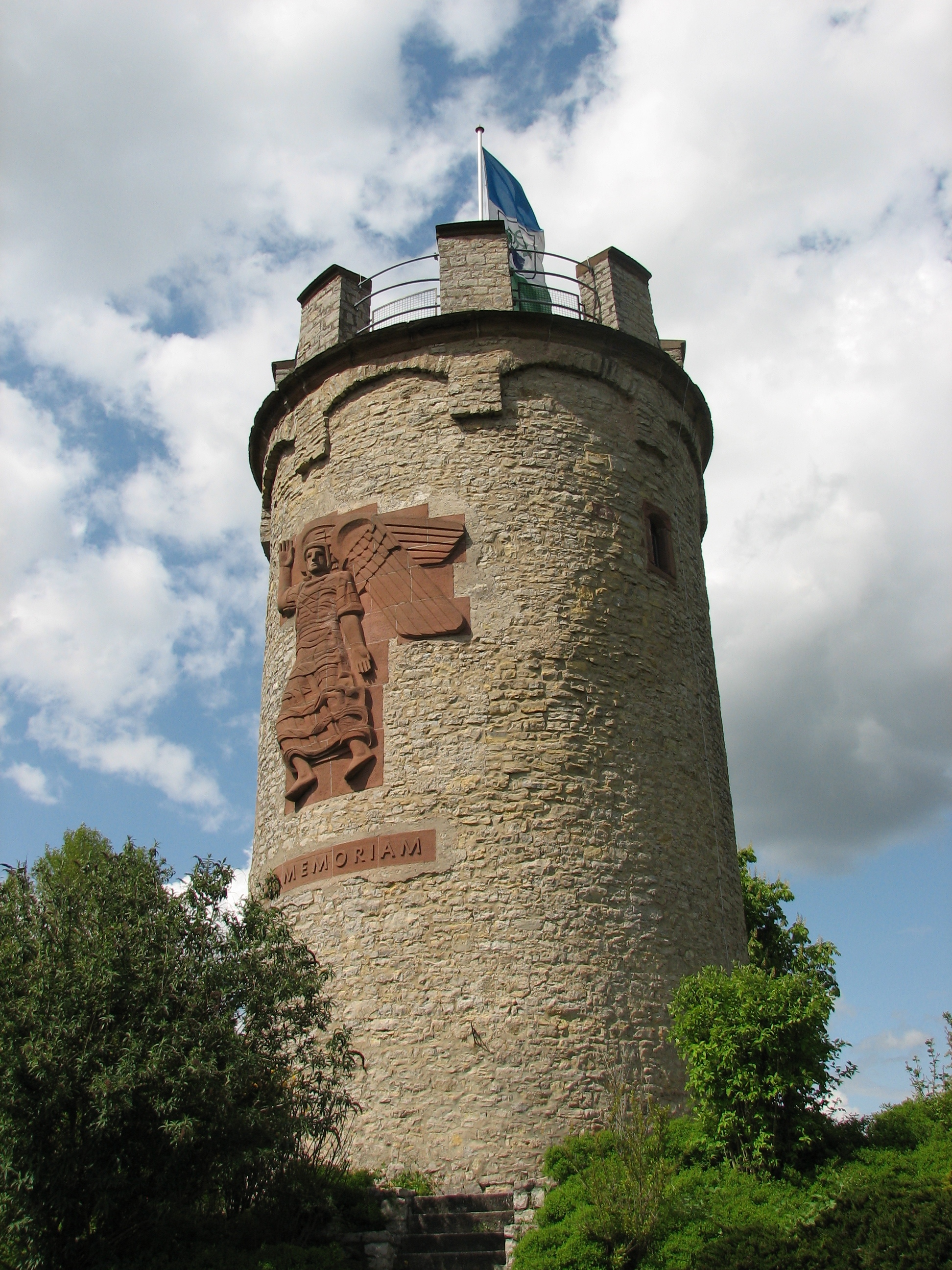
Memorial tower (Wartturm)
