= Bertha Benz Memorial Route =

Tourist and theme route in Baden-Württemberg, Germany

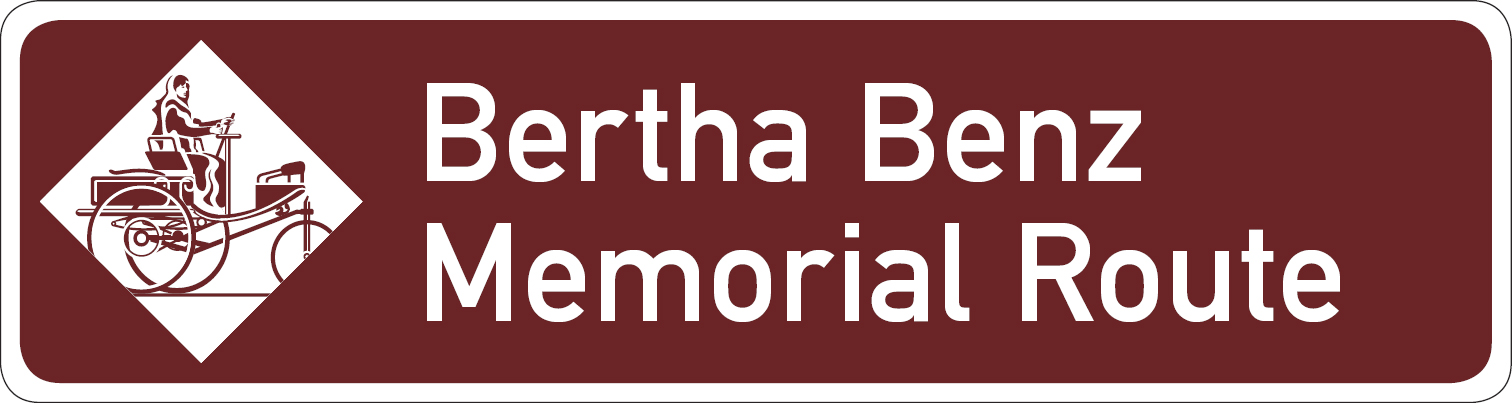
Bertha Benz Memorial Route
- Bertha Benz Historical Route, South portion in blue, North portion in red, Historical portion in green which more closely aligns to her original journey

Route information
- Length: 104 km (65 mi)
- Existed: 25 February 2008–present

Major junctions
- Tourist loop
- South end: Pforzheim
- North end: Mannheim

Location
- Country: Germany

Highway system
- Roads in Germany; Autobahns; List; Federal; List; State; E-roads

The Bertha Benz Memorial Route is a German tourist and theme route in Baden-Württemberg and member of the European Route of Industrial Heritage. It opened in 2008 and follows the tracks of the world's first long-distance road trip by a vehicle powered with an internal combustion engine, in 1888. The trip was taken by Bertha Benz in the world's first automobile, the Benz Patent-Motorwagen, created by her husband, Carl Benz.

== History ==
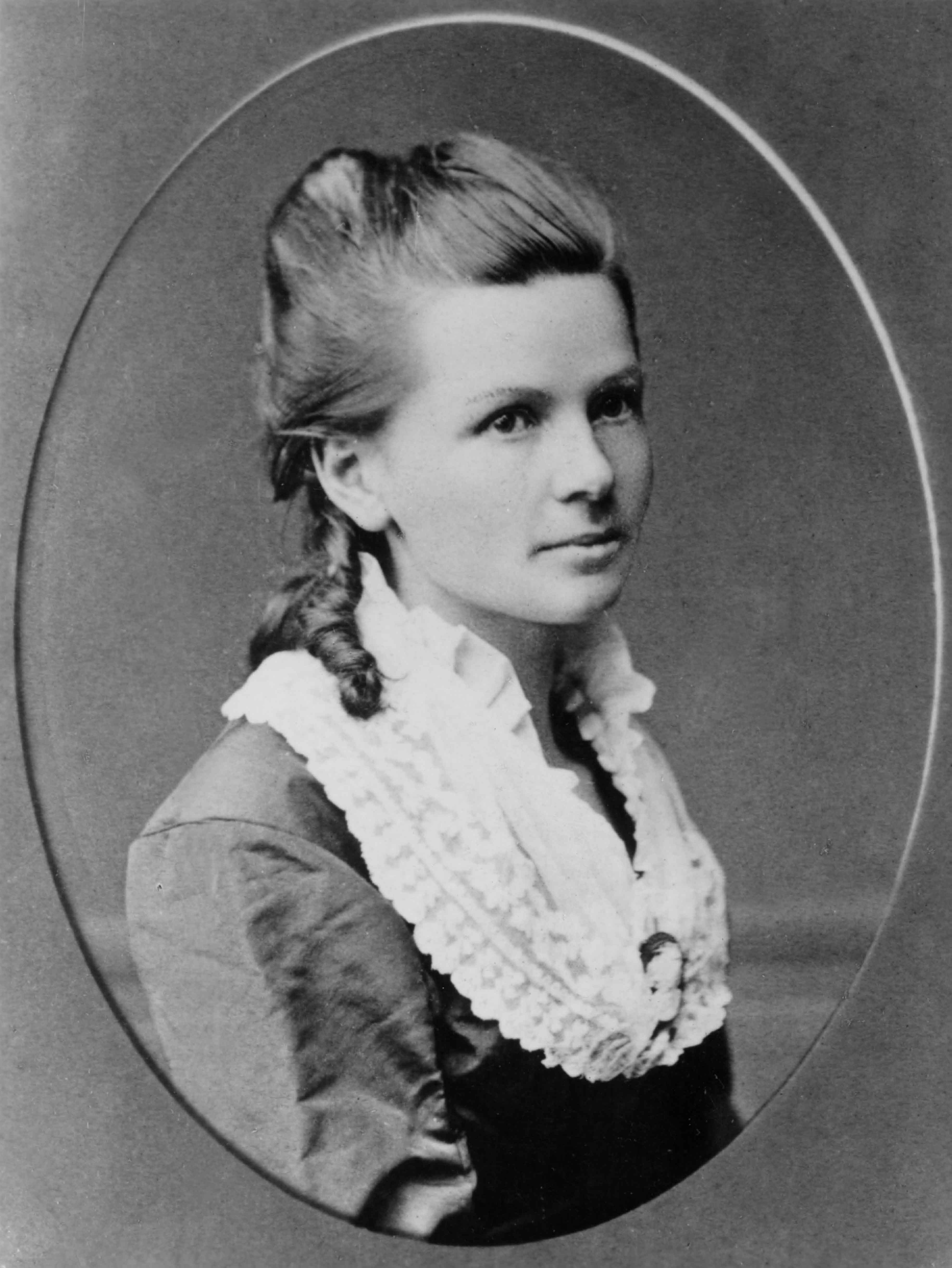
Bertha Benz (1849–1944)

Bertha Benz's husband, Carl Benz, patented the first automobile designed to produce its own power in January 1886 (Reichspatent Nr. 37435).

In early August 1888, without her husband's knowledge, Bertha Benz, with her sons Richard (aged 14) and Eugen (aged 15), drove in Benz's newly constructed Patent Motorwagen No. 3 automobile from Mannheim to her own birthplace, Pforzheim, becoming the first person to drive an automobile powered with an internal combustion engine over more than a very short distance. The distance was about 104 km (65 mi). Distances driven before this historic trip were short, being merely trials with mechanical assistants.

Although the ostensible purpose of the trip was to visit her mother, Bertha Benz also had another motive: to show her husband – who had failed to consider marketing his invention adequately – that the automobile would become a financial success once it was shown to be useful to the general public.

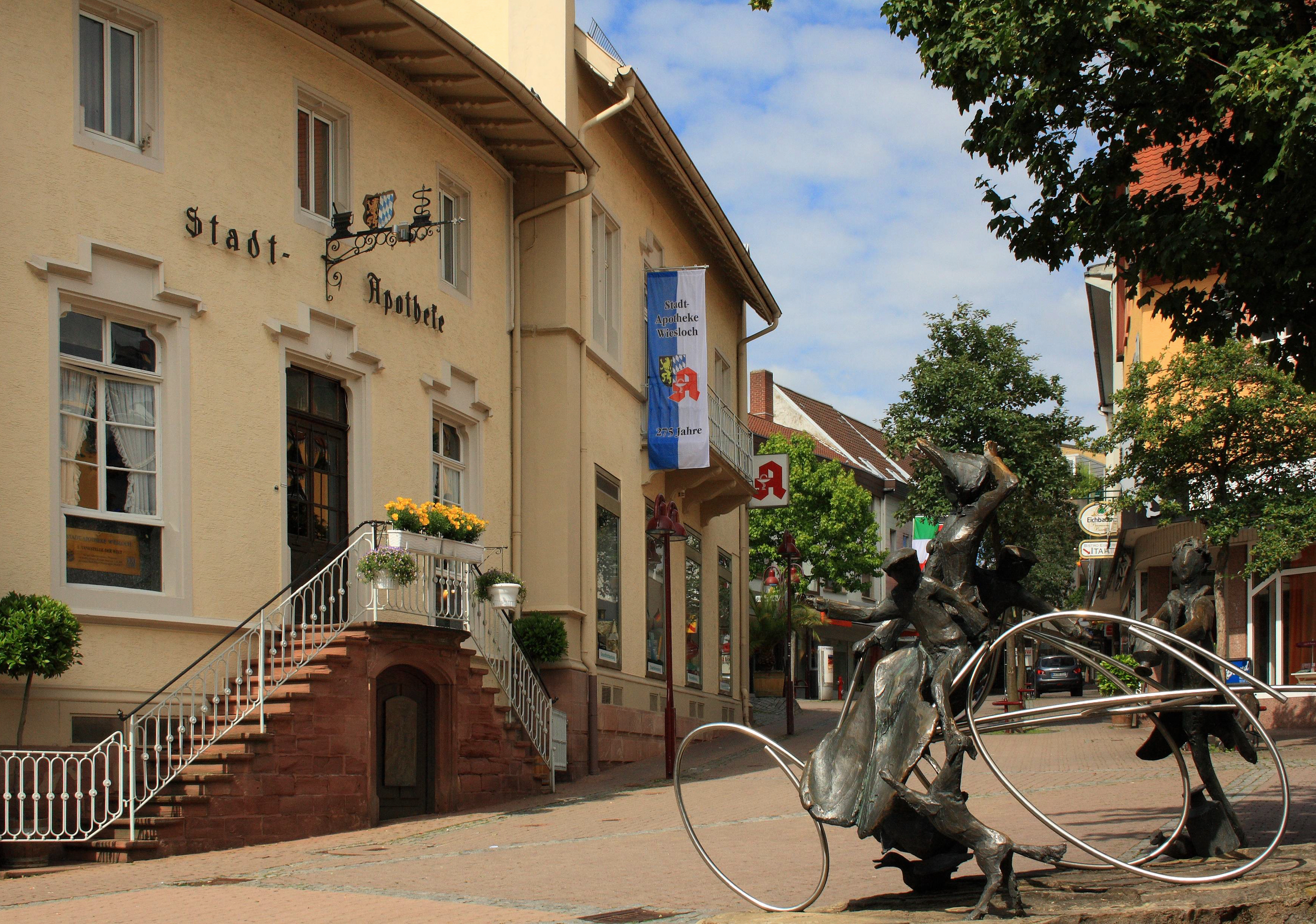
The town pharmacy in Wiesloch, referred to as the "First filling station in the world", with a monument dedicated to her historic first car trip on the right

On the way, she solved numerous problems. She had to find Ligroin, a solvent available only at pharmacies, to use as fuel. Thus the still existing Stadt-Apotheke (Town Pharmacy) in Wiesloch, some kilometers south of Heidelberg, became the world's first gas station. A blacksmith had to help mend a chain in Bruchsal. Brake linings were replaced in Bauschlott/Neulingen north of Pforzheim. And Benz had to use a long, straight hatpin to clean a fuel pipe which had become blocked and a garter to insulate a wire.

Benz and her sons left Mannheim around dawn and reached Pforzheim somewhat after dusk, notifying Karl of their successful journey by telegram. They drove back to Mannheim three days later, by a different route.

Along the way, several people were frightened by the automobile, but the novel trip received a great deal of publicity – as she had intended. The drive was very helpful for Karl Benz, as he was able to introduce several improvements after his wife reported everything that had happened along the way – and she made important suggestions, such as the introduction of an additional gear for climbing hills.

== Overview ==
In 2007 a not-for-profit initiative, led by Edgar and Frauke Meyer, founded two societies, Bertha Benz Memorial Route e.V. and Bertha Benz Memorial Club e.V., to commemorate Bertha Benz and her historic pioneering deed.

On February 25, 2008, the Bertha Benz Memorial Route was officially approved as a Tourist or Scenic Route by the German authorities, a dynamic monument of 194 km of German industrial culture.

== The route ==
=== Outbound trip ===
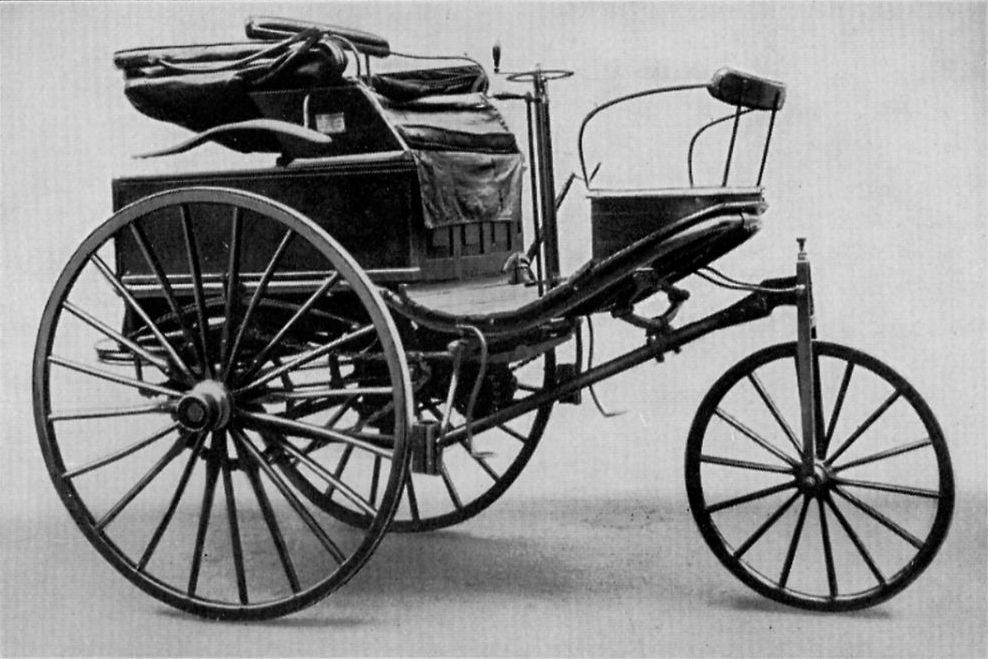
The Benz Patent-Motorwagen Nr. 3 of the year 1888

Mannheim to Pforzheim, approx. 104 km (65 mi), southbound (S):

Mannheim, Mannheim-Feudenheim, Ilvesheim, Ladenburg, Schriesheim, Dossenheim, Heidelberg, Leimen, Nußloch, Wiesloch, Mingolsheim, Langenbrücken, Stettfeld, Ubstadt, Bruchsal, Untergrombach, Weingarten, Karlsruhe-Grötzingen, Berghausen, Söllingen, Kleinsteinbach, Wilferdingen, Königsbach, Stein, Eisingen, Pforzheim

=== Return trip ===
Pforzheim to Mannheim, approx. 90 km (56 mi), northbound (N):

Pforzheim, Bauschlott, Bretten, Gondelsheim, Helmsheim, Heidelsheim, Bruchsal, Forst, Hambrücken, Wiesental, Kirrlach, Reilingen, Hockenheim, Talhaus, Ketsch, Schwetzingen, Mannheim-Friedrichsfeld, Mannheim-Seckenheim, Mannheim

== Landscapes ==
The authentic route taken by Bertha Benz not only links almost forgotten original sites she passed on her way, it also leads to the wine region of Baden.

The route follows several Roman roads in the area of the Upper Rhine Plain, for example, the Bergstraße (Mountain Road). It leads along the foot of the Odenwald mountains and the Kraichgau. Shortly before reaching Karlsruhe, it branches off into the Pfinz valley leading to Pforzheim, the entrance to the Black Forest.

As Bertha was afraid of some steep mountains, the return trip follows an alternative route and finishes by following the Rhine river back to Mannheim.

== Sights ==
- Mannheim: Mannheim Palace, Luisenpark, Water-Tower
- Ladenburg: Automuseum Dr. Carl Benz, House of the Benz Family, Old Town
- Heidelberg: Heidelberg Castle, Old Town, Old Bridge
- Wiesloch: The World's first filling station (Town Pharmacy)
- Bruchsal: Bruchsal Castle
- Pforzheim: Museum of Jewelry, House of Industry
- Bretten: Melanchthon's House, close by Maulbronn Abbey (World Heritage Site of UNESCO), students: Johannes Kepler, Friedrich Hölderlin, Hermann Hesse (Steppenwolf)
- Hockenheim: Museum of Motorsports at the Hockenheimring, Hockenheimring
- Schwetzingen: Schwetzingen Castle
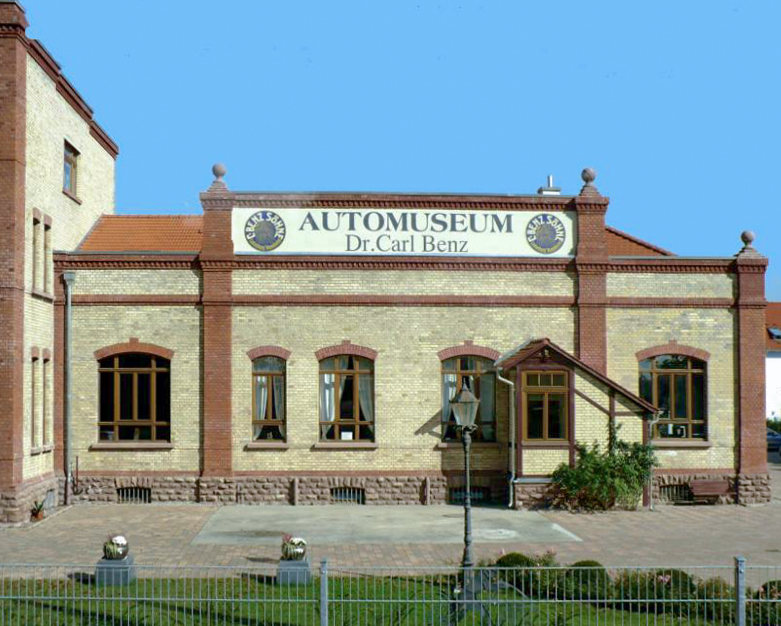
Automuseum Dr. Carl Benz, Ladenburg

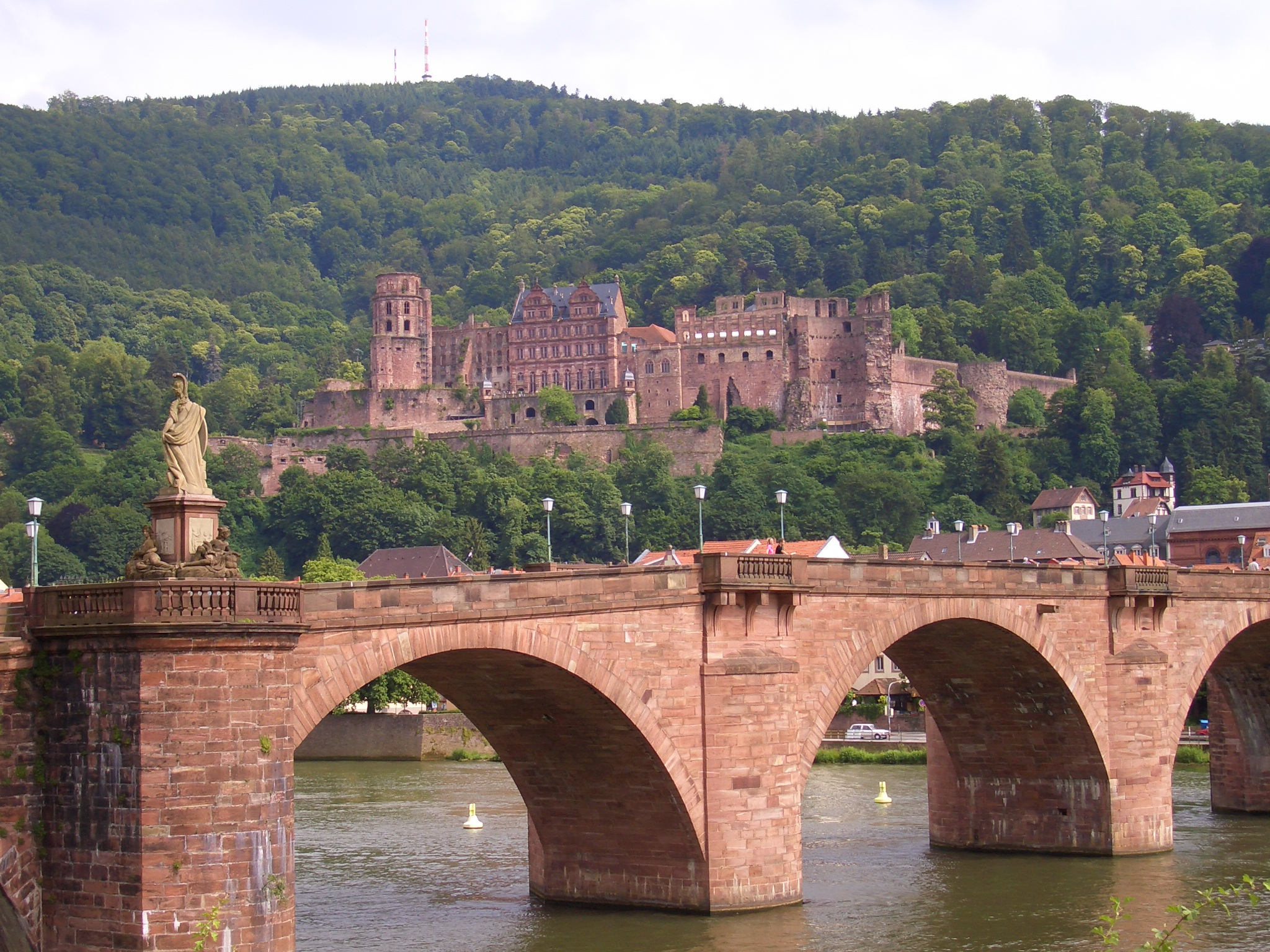
Heidelberg Castle and Old Bridge

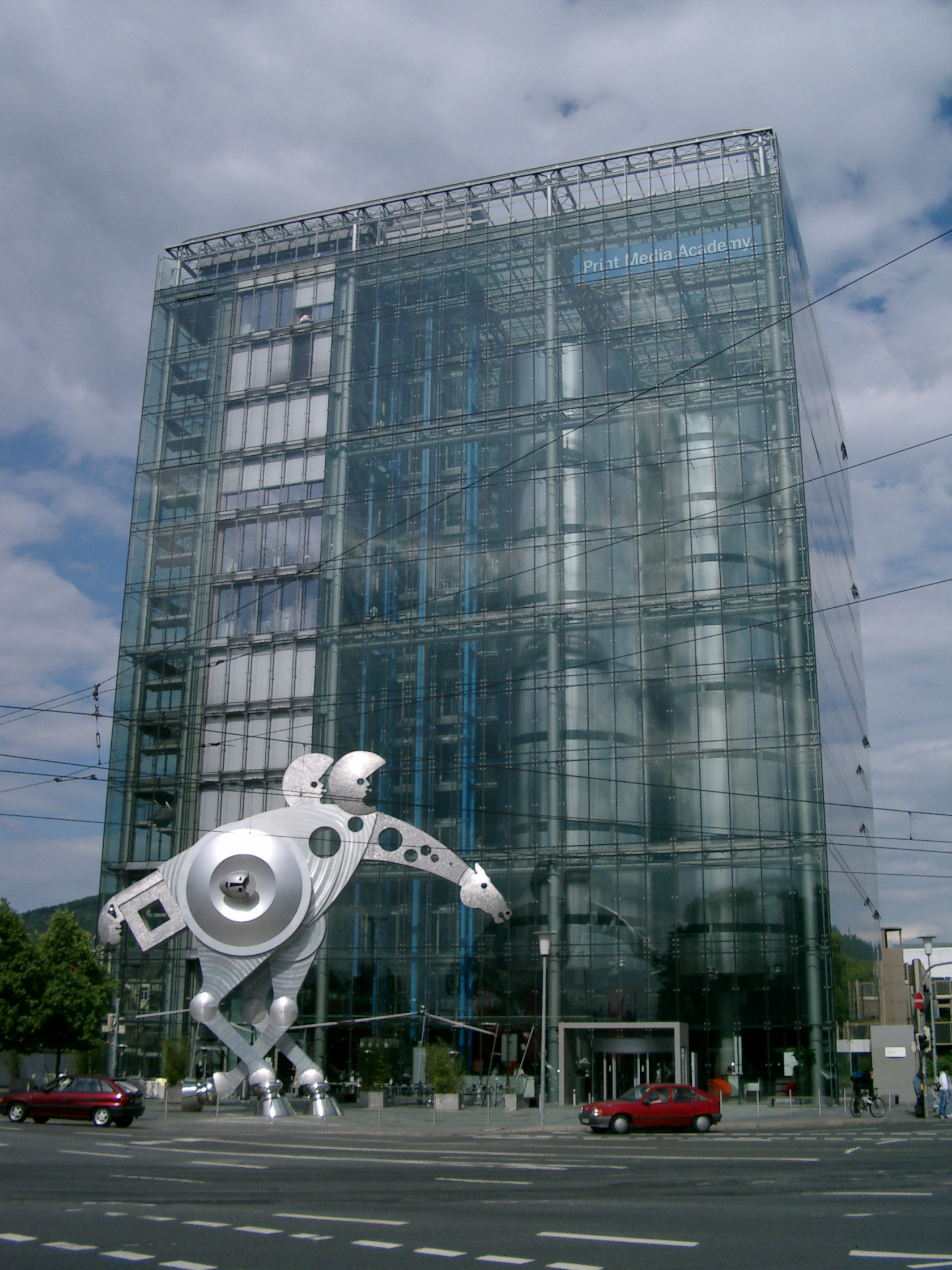
Heidelberger Druckmaschinen

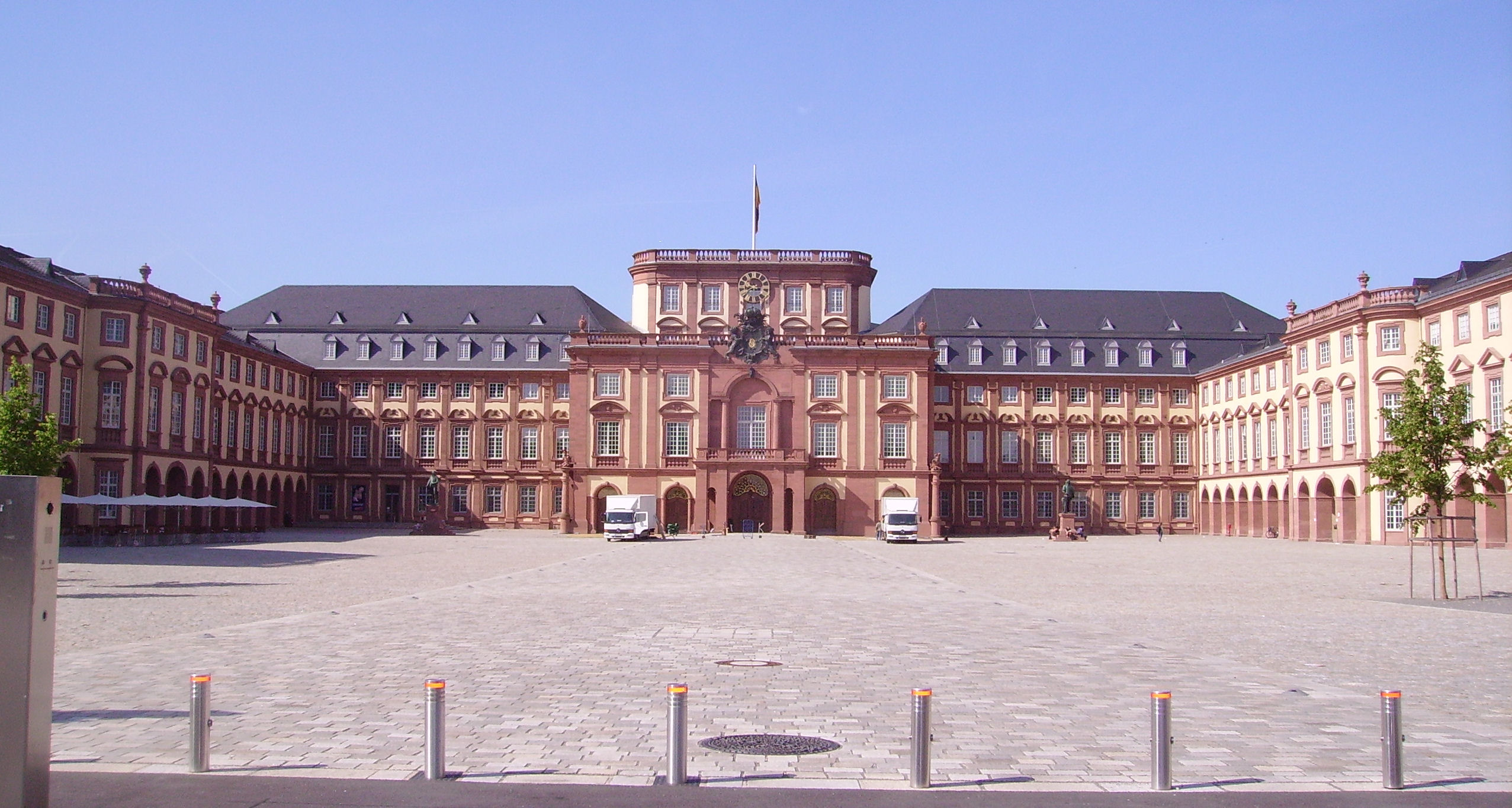
Mannheim Palace

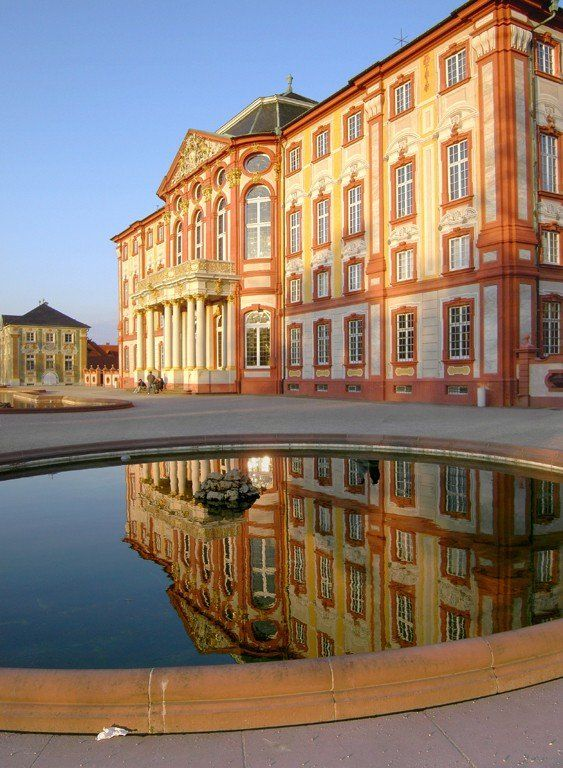
Bruchsal Castle

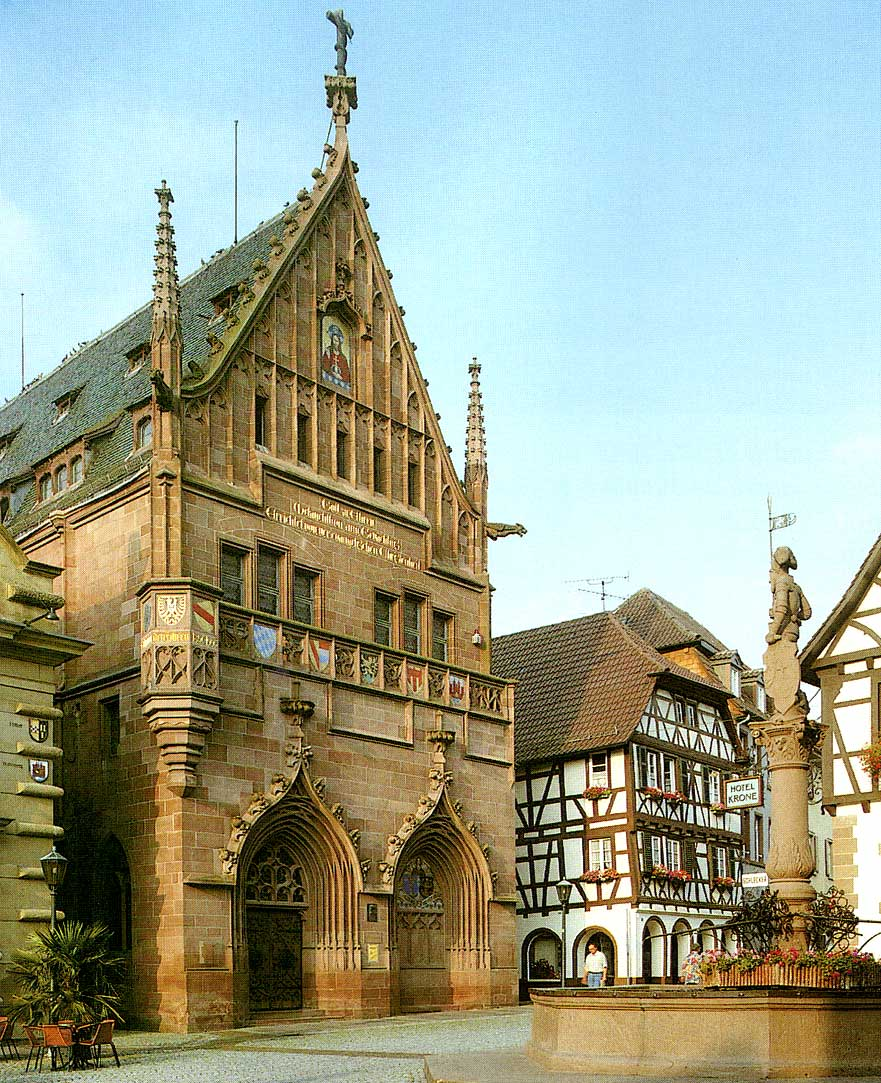
Melanchthon's House, Bretten

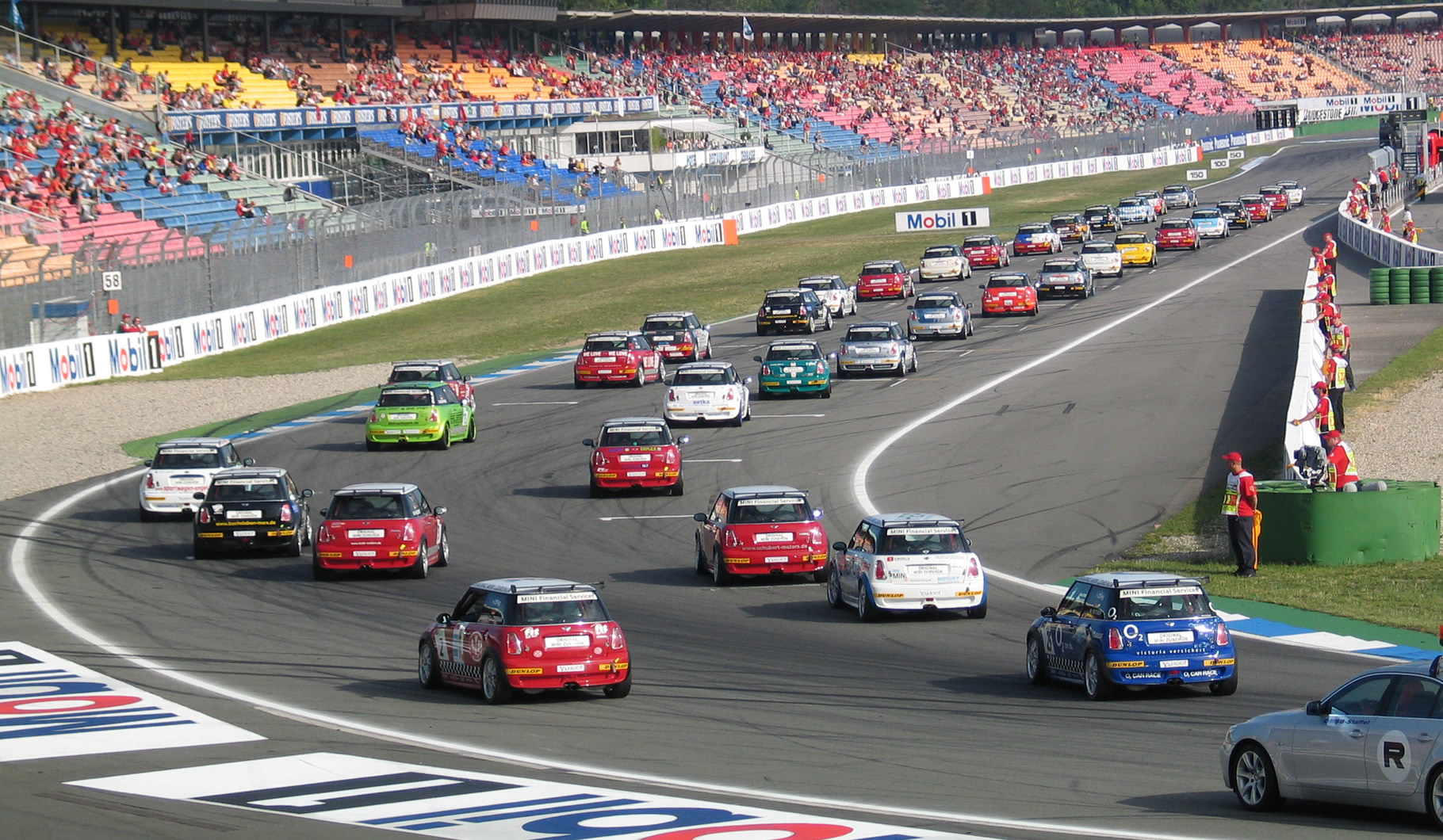
Hockenheimring

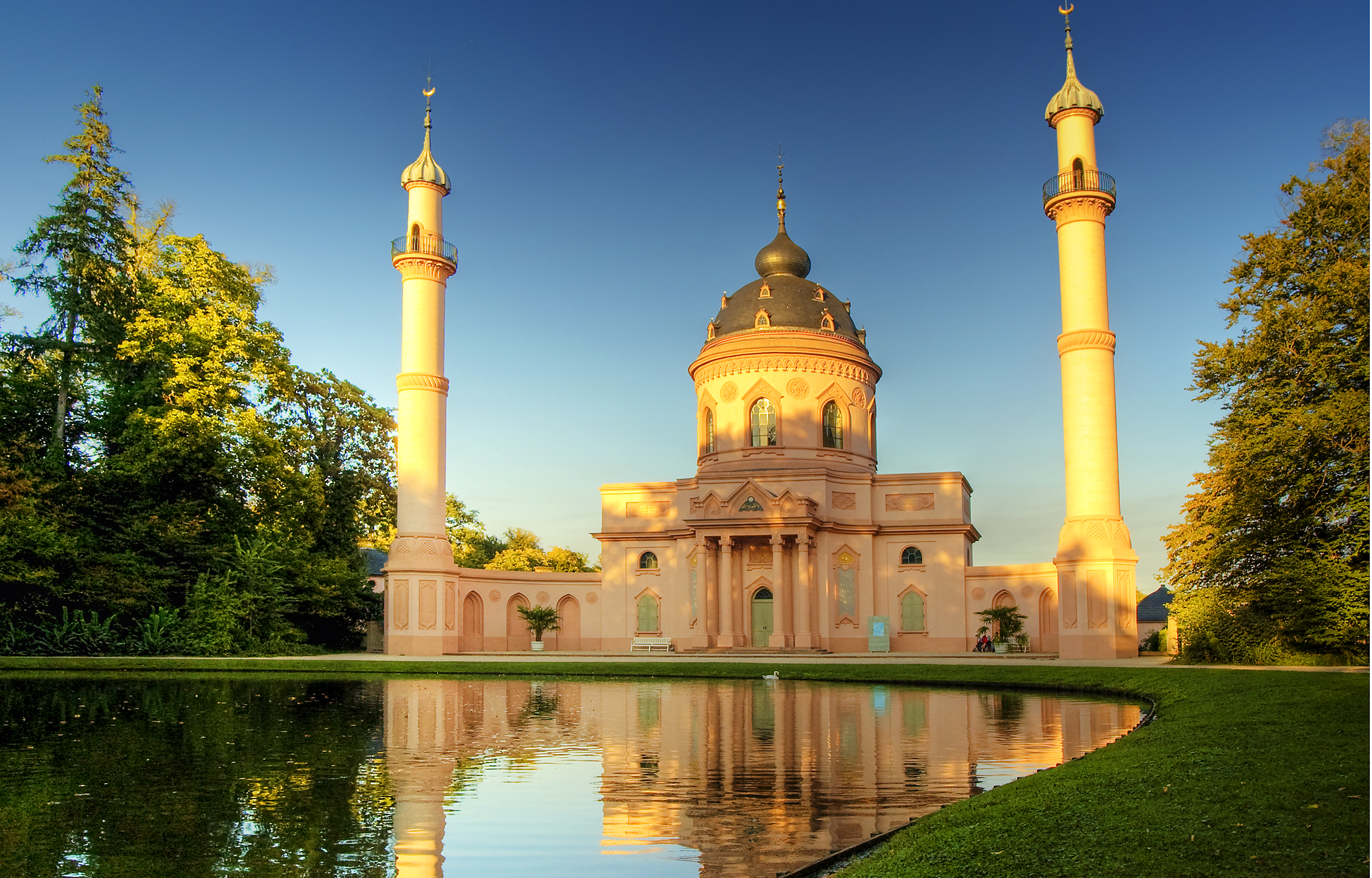
Red Mosque of Schwetzingen Castle

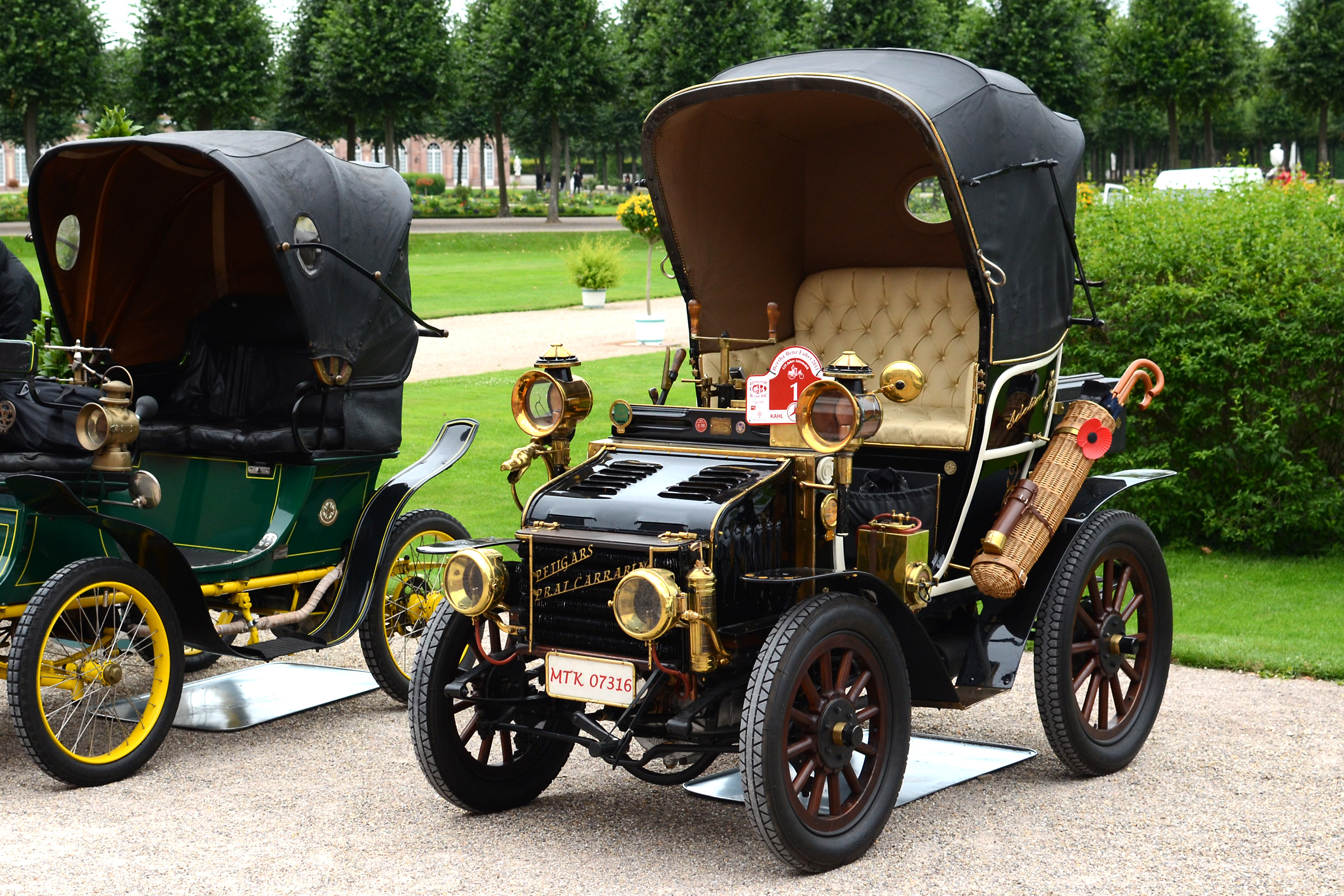
Petigars Prat Carrabin at Schwetzingen Castle

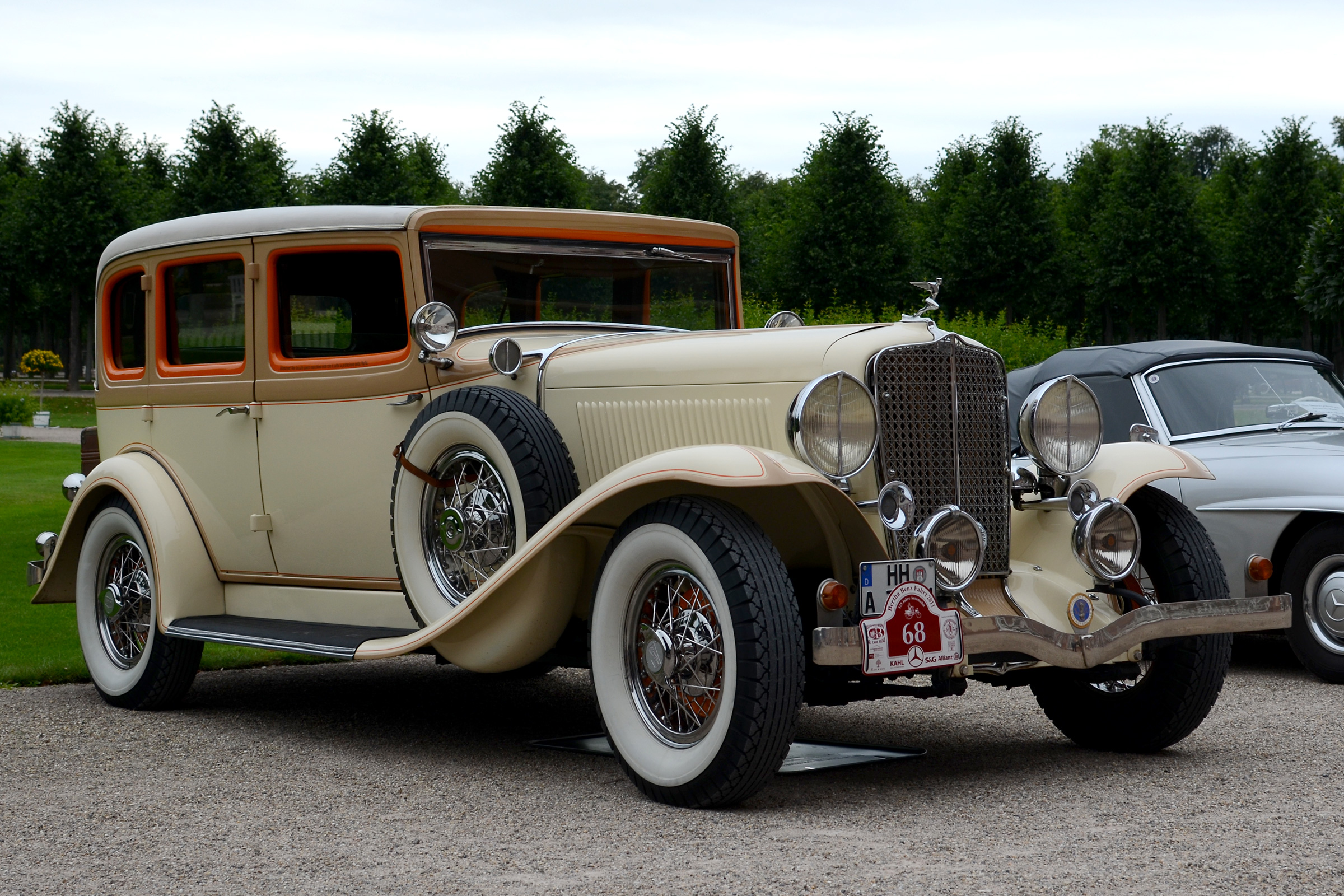
Auburn at Schwetzingen Castle

== Bertha Benz Challenge ==
The Bertha Benz Memorial Route opened in September 2008. But the Ministry of State of Baden-Württemberg suggested embedding the official inaugural run in the framework of the ceremony of Automobile Summer 2011, the big official German event and birthday party commemorating the invention of the automobile by Karl Benz.

On January 25, 2011, Deutsche Welle (DW-TV) broadcast worldwide in its series Made in Germany a TV documentary on the invention of the automobile by Karl Benz, highlighting the very important role of his wife Bertha Benz. The report was not only on the history of the automobile, but took a look at its future as well, as shown by the Bertha Benz Challenge.

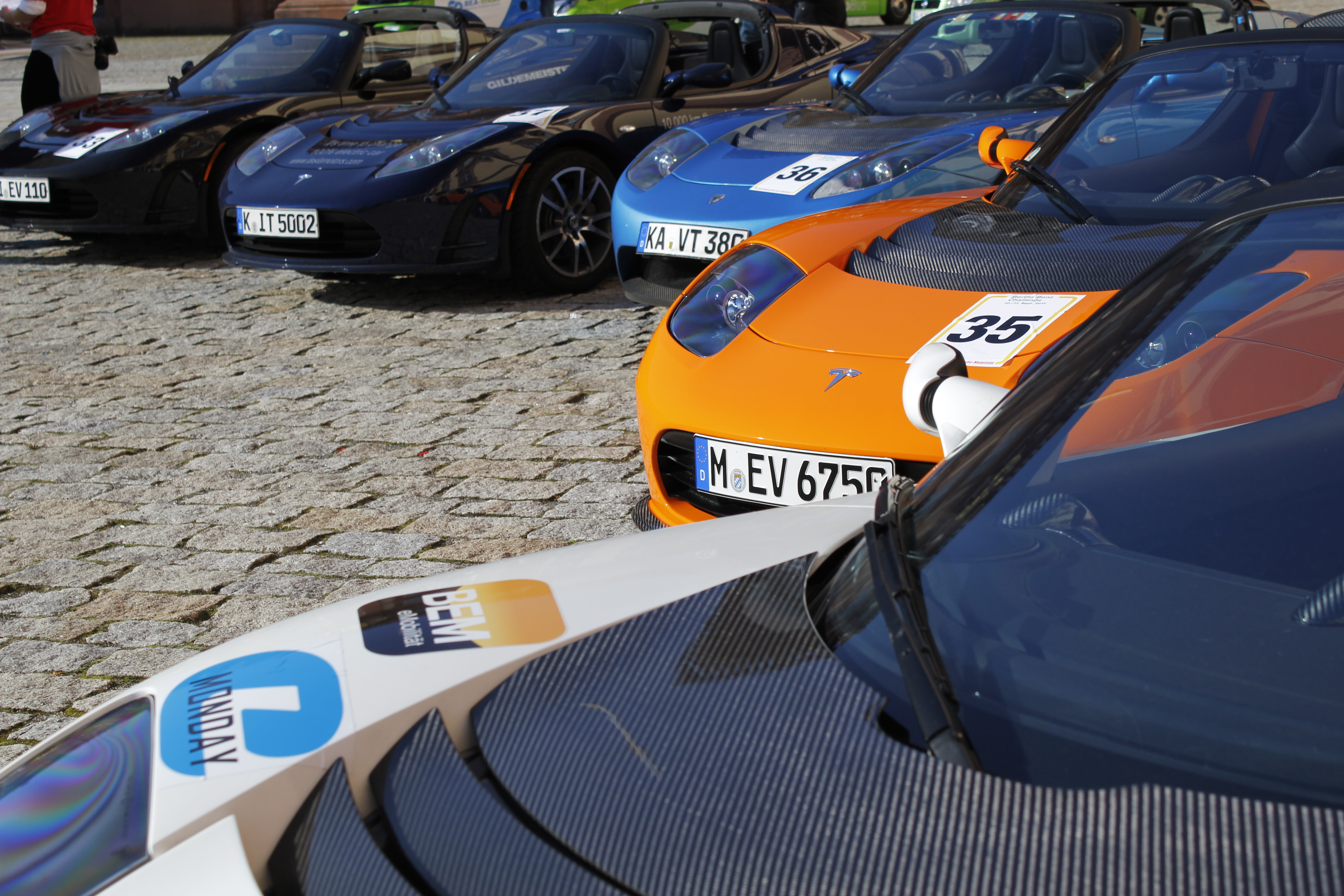
Tesla Roadsters at the Bertha Benz Challenge 2011 in Mannheim.

The first Bertha Benz Challenge took place on September 10 and 11, 2011. In the future it will take place yearly, aiming to become a globally visible signal for a new automobile breakthrough, as it is only open for sustainable mobility: Future-oriented vehicles with alternative drive systems – hybrid and electric vehicles, hydrogen and fuel cells – and other extremely economical vehicles. Its motto was: "Sustainable Mobility on the World's Oldest Automobile Road!"

The second Bertha Benz Challenge took place from September 14 to 16, 2012, but started from the Automechanika held by the Frankfurt Trade Fair. It also included two rounds on the motodrom of the Hockenheimring, that thus opened itself towards sustainable future mobility.

The third Bertha Benz Challenge took place from September 13 to 15, 2013, starting for the first time from the Frankfurt Motor Show, one of the world's largest motor shows, and supported by the presence of the German Environment Minister, Peter Altmaier along with Winfried Kretschmann and Volker Bouffier, the Prime Ministers respectively of Baden-Württemberg and Hesse.
