= Wöschbach =

Coordinates: 49°00′08″N 8°33′58″E

Wöschbach is a village in the municipality of Pfinztal, in Karlsruhe, Baden-Württemberg, Germany. It is one of the four villages in the municipality and has about 3,000 inhabitants.

Wöschbach was first mentioned during the 13th century. During the Thirty Years' War the village lost its entire population. After World War II 400 refugees were sent to live in Wöschbach.
