= Königsbach-Stein =

German municipality

- Municipality
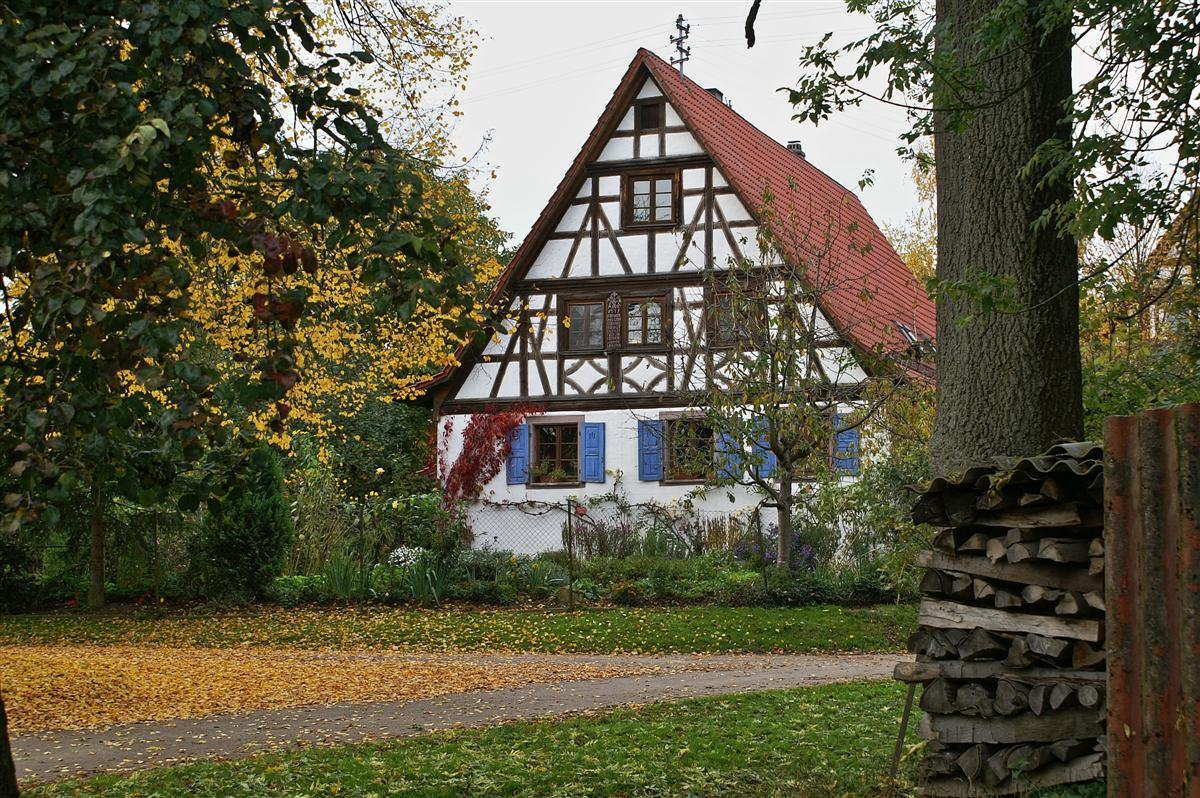
- The Traishof, in Königsbach

- Coat of arms

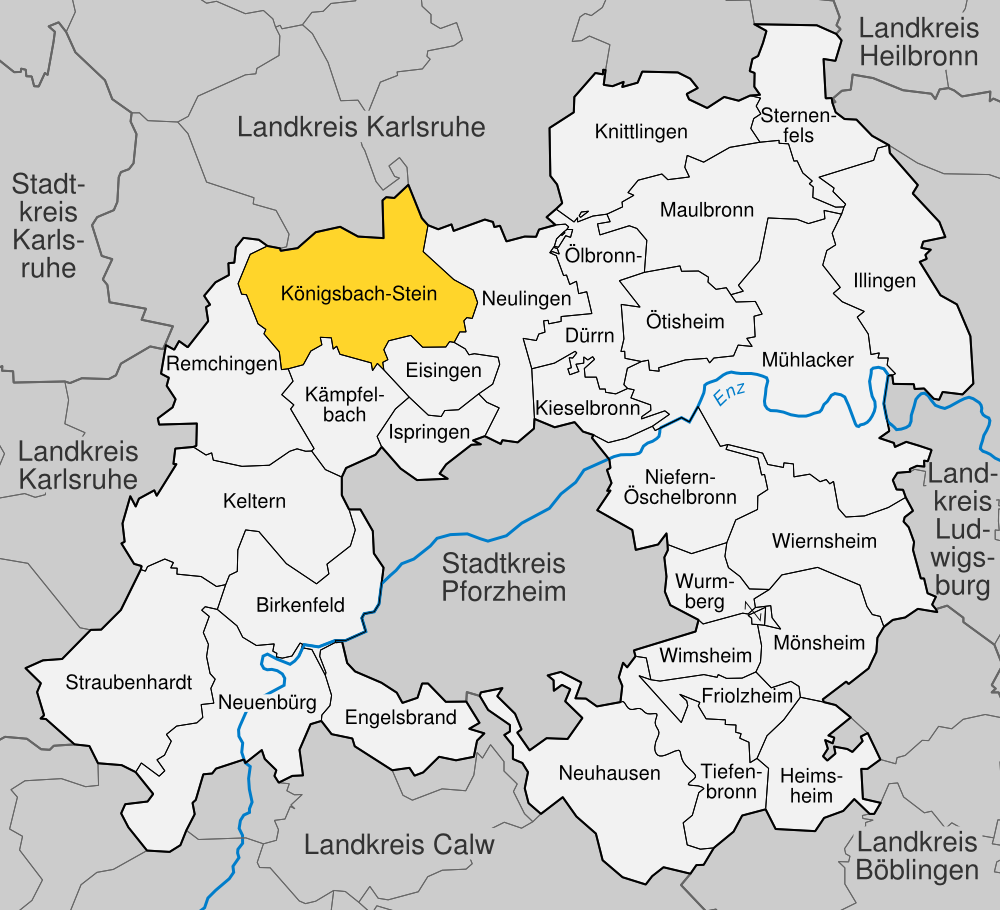
- Location of Königsbach-Stein within Enzkreis district
- Interactive map of Königsbach-Stein
- Location within Germany Location within Baden-Württemberg
- Coordinates: 48°57′59″N 8°36′32″E
- Country: Germany
- State: Baden-Württemberg
- Admin. region: Karlsruhe
- District: Enzkreis

Area
  - Total: 33.72 km^{2} (13.02 sq mi)
- Elevation: 177 m (581 ft)

Population (2025-12-31)
  - Total: 10,133
  - Density: 300.5/km^{2} (778.3/sq mi)
- Time zone: UTC+01:00 (CET)
  - Summer (DST): UTC+02:00 (CEST)
- Postal codes: 75203
- Dialling codes: 07232
- Vehicle registration: PF
- Website: www.koenigsbach-stein.de

Königsbach-Stein is a municipality in the district of Enz in Baden-Württemberg in Germany. It is located on Bertha Benz Memorial Route.

== History ==
Until German mediatization, the town of Stein was ruled by both the Margraviate of Baden and the Barony of Saint-André. After meditization, it was assigned to the Amt of Königsbach on 24 July 1813. On 25 May 1821, Stein was assigned to Bezirksamt Bretten and Königsbach to Bezirksamt Durlach. Stein was reassigned again to the district of Pforzheim in 1920 and was joined on 1 April 1924 by Königsbach. The two towns remained with Pforzheim until, with the 1973 Baden-Württemberg district reform, they were assigned to the new Enz district. Stein and Königsbach merged to form Königsbach-Stein on 1 July 1974. On 20 June 1989, 39 hectares (96 acres) of the Steiner Mittelberg, a local mountain, became the Beim Steiner Mittelberg Federally-protected nature reserve (Naturschutzgebiet).

Karl-Möller-Straße in Königsbach-Stein is named after author Karl Leopold von Möller.

== Geography ==
The municipality (Gemeinde) of Königsbach-Stein covers an area of 33.72 square kilometers (13.02 mi^{2}) of the Enz district, within the state of Baden-Württemberg and the Federal Republic of Germany. Physically, it is located at the southern end of Kraichgau, a hilly region formed by layers of Lower and Middle Muschelkalk of the Pfinzhügelland. The primary watercourse within the municipal area is the Kämpfelbach. The lowest elevation in the municipality, 161 meters (528 ft) Normalnull (NN), is found where the Kämpfelbach flows into Remchingen. The highest elevation, 333 meters (1,093 ft) NN, is found at the Langenwald campsite.

== Demographics ==
Population development:

Year	Inhabitants
1990	8,700
2001	9,791
2011	9,729
2021	10,179

== Coat of arms ==
Königsbach-Stein's municipal coat of arms were awarded by government of the Enz district on 16 November 1992. It is divided into four sections by quartering. In the top left quarter is a bend in red on a golden field, followed by a bust of a king upon a silver field in the top right. The bottom left quarter, a pair of silver calipers measures a stone on a blue field, and the final quarter is made up by a blue wavy bar on a silver field.
