= Neuburgweier =

- Stadtteil of Rheinstetten
- Coat of arms
- Interactive map of Neuburgweier
- Location within Germany Location within Baden-Württemberg
- Coordinates: 48°58′10″N 8°16′00″E
- Country: Germany
- State: Baden-Württemberg
- Admin. region: Karlsruhe
- District: Karlsruhe
- Town: Rheinstetten

Area
  - Total: 3.85 km^{2} (1.49 sq mi)

Population (2014-12-31)
  - Total: 2,482
  - Density: 645/km^{2} (1,670/sq mi)
- Time zone: UTC+01:00 (CET)
  - Summer (DST): UTC+02:00 (CEST)
- Postal codes: 76287
- Dialling codes: 07242

Neuburgweier is a part of the city Rheinstetten, which was first established as a municipality in the course of an administrative reform in 1975. In terms of inhabitants and area, it is the smallest of the three city parts - Neuburgweier, Forchheim and Mörsch.

Following places border on Neuburgweier: Forchheim, Mörsch, Au am Rhein and on the other side of the Rhine, Neuburg am Rhein.

== Local Geography ==
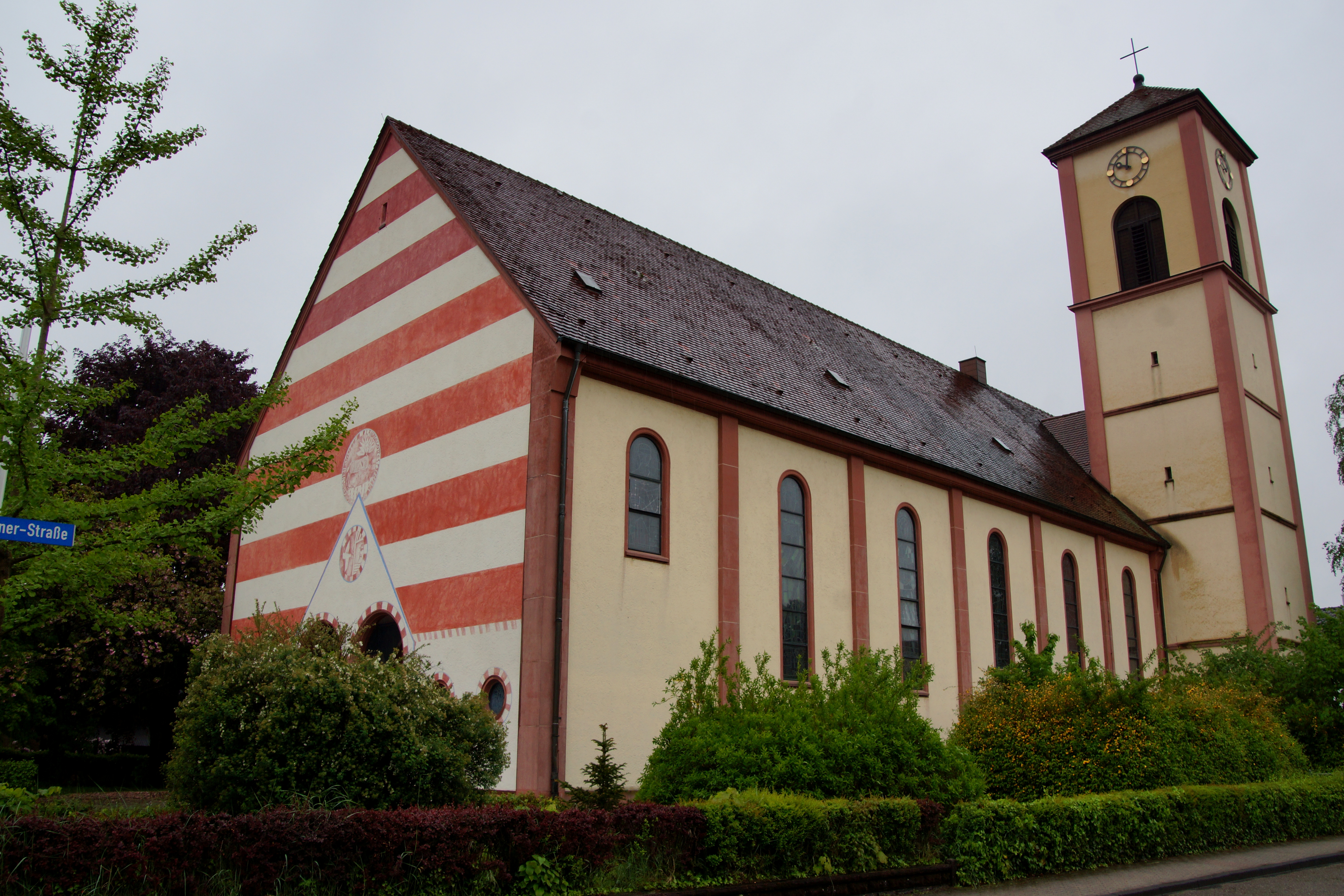
Roman Catholic church St. Ursula

To the west of Neuburgweier is the Rhine which forms the natural border to Rhineland-Palatinate. The riparian woodlands in the area are designated nature reserves. In the area surrounding Neuburgweier is also a large, former gravel pit. The gravel pit, which is naturally filled with water, is now called Fermasee and is used for swimming and fishing.

The Federbach flows through Neuburgweier. The nature reserve Kunzenbach borders on the nature reserve of Neburgweier.

=== Size and Population ===
Neuburgweier has about 2,500 residents and is about 385 hectares large. Neburgweier is in terms of population comparable with Würmersheim. Neuburgweier is the smallest one of all three city districts of Rheinstetten.

== History ==
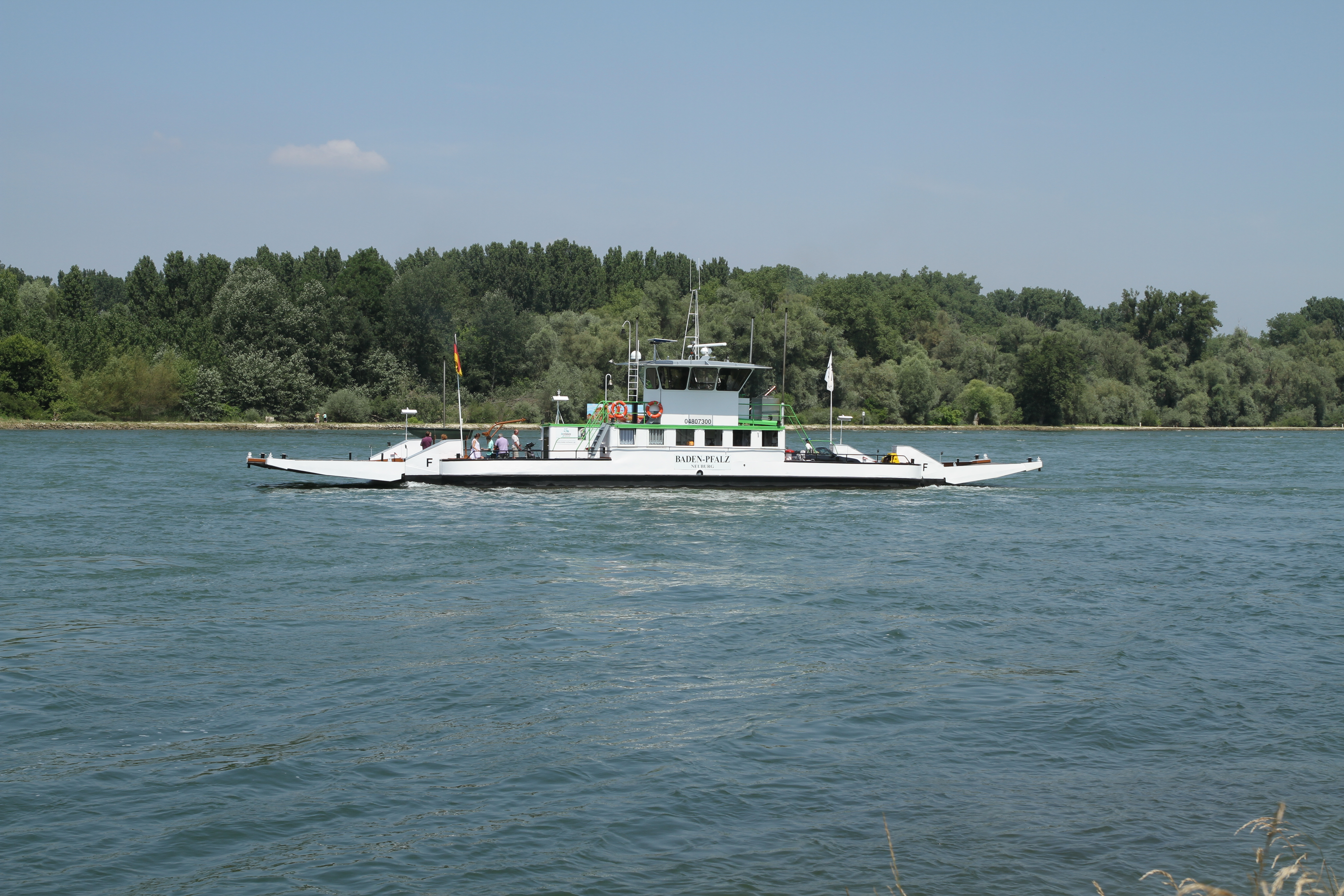
Ferry 'Baden-Pfalz'

Until 1707, Neuburgweier was a weiler (comparable to the English concept of a hamlet) belonging to Neuburg am Rhein. In 1592, Neuburg am Rhein ended up westward of the Rhine through a modification of the river course. Since then Neuburg am Rhein and Neuburgweier have been geographically separated. It is assumed that Neuburg am Rhein was founded in 1100 by the diocese of Speyer to secure a place to cross the river.

Today, there is a ferry between Neuburgweier and Neuburg am Rhein, also known under the name of "'Baden-Pfalz' Fähre".
