= Rheinstetten =

- Town
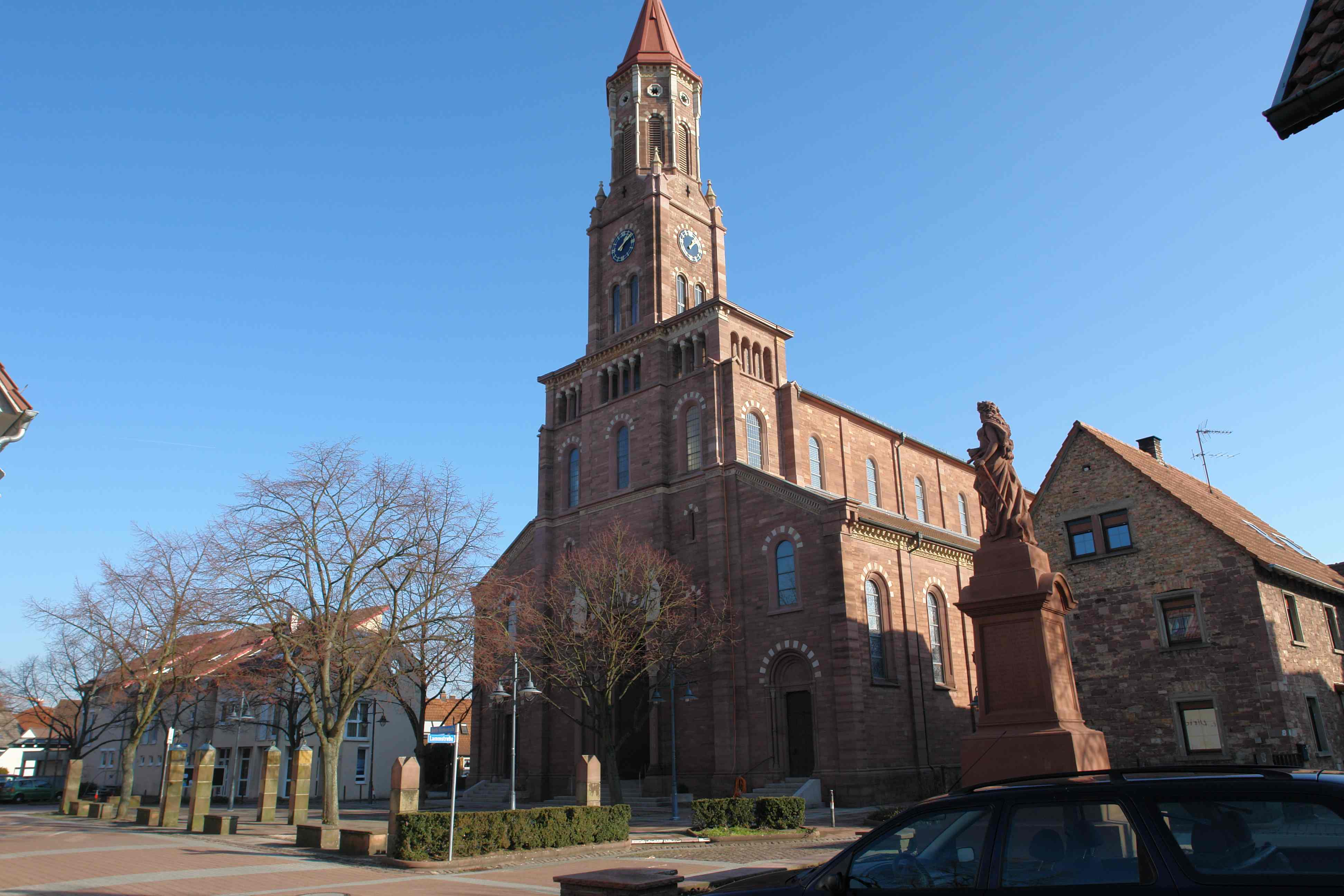
- Church of Saint Ulrich in Mörsch

- Coat of arms

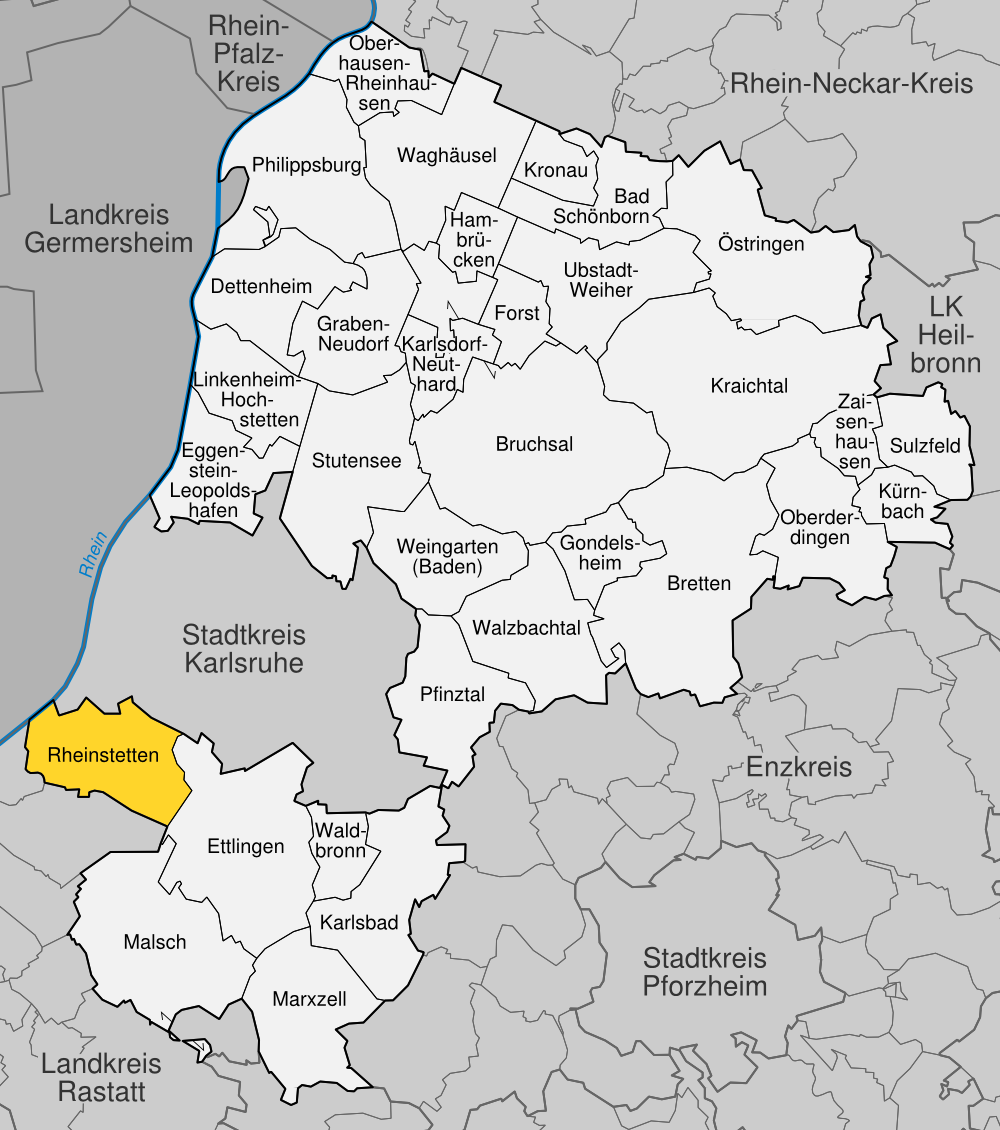
- Location of Rheinstetten within Karlsruhe district
- Interactive map of Rheinstetten
- Location within Germany Location within Baden-Württemberg
- Coordinates: 48°57′38″N 8°17′23″E
- Country: Germany
- State: Baden-Württemberg
- Admin. region: Karlsruhe
- District: Karlsruhe
- Subdivisions: 3

Government
  - Mayor (2023–31): Sebastian Schrempp (CDU)

Area
  - Total: 32.31 km^{2} (12.47 sq mi)
- Elevation: 114 m (374 ft)

Population (2025-12-31)
  - Total: 21,233
  - Density: 657.2/km^{2} (1,702/sq mi)
- Time zone: UTC+01:00 (CET)
  - Summer (DST): UTC+02:00 (CEST)
- Postal codes: 76276–76287
- Dialling codes: 07242, 0721
- Vehicle registration: KA
- Website: www.rheinstetten.de

Rheinstetten in the Karlsruhe district

Rheinstetten (German pronunciation: [ʁaɪnˈʃtɛtn̩]; South Franconian: Rhoischdedde) is a town in the west of Baden-Württemberg on the border to Rhineland-Palatinate. It is situated to the south-west of Karlsruhe and belongs to the rural district of Karlsruhe. The city has fewer inhabitants than Bruchsal, Ettlingen, Bretten and Stutensee and is therefore the fifth largest city in the district of Karlsruhe. Since 2005 it has formed part of a regional organization for economy, science, culture and administration, the Technologieregion Karlsruhe.

Rheinstetten was formed in 1975 by a merger of the former municipalities of Forchheim, Morsch and Neuburgweier. In 2000 it received town privileges and became a district seat on 1 January 2005.

== Geography ==
The town is located in the Upper Rhine Plain, about 10 km southwest of Karlsruhe. The Black Forest is ten kilometers to the east. The Rhine forms the west border of the town and also marks the border to Rhineland-Palatinate. A small river, called the Federbach flows through the town. In the South the town borders on the municipality of Durmersheim. The federal highway 36 splits the city; to the west of the highway lies the city, to the south is agricultural land. Further to the east is a forest named Hardtwald.

=== City Structure ===
The urban area of Rheinstetten consists of the three districts of Mörsch, Forchheim and Neuburgweier.

The district of Forchheim consists of the following villages: Forchheim, "Dammfeldsiedlung", Silberstreifen and includes the 19th century "Durmerheimer Landstraße" house and "Nußbaumäcker" estate. The abandoned village of "Derssloch" is also within the district area of Forchheim. The district of Mörsch consists of the village Mörsch and the gravel pit. Neuburgweier has no further land aside from the village itself. The abandoned villages of "Königsmörsch" and "Staudendorf" lie within Neuburgweier.

In addition to Neuburgweier being a city district, it is also an "Ortschaft" (provincial town) of Baden-Württemberg, which means it has certain rights according to the Gemeindeordnung [council law).

=== Neighboring Cities ===
The neighboring cities of Rheinstetten are on one side of the Rhine:Karlsruhe, Ettlingen (in Karlsruhe (district)), Durmersheim and Au am Rhein(in Rastatt (district)) and, on the other side of the Rhine in Rhineland-Palatinate the city Neuburg am Rhein (in Germersheim (district)).

== History ==
Rheinstetten was founded on 1 January 1975, in the course of the reformation of municipalities in Baden-Württemberg. Three communities, Forchheim, Mörsch and Neuburgweier merged to form the district of Rheinstetten. By 1993 Rheinstetten had 23,000 inhabitants. It was thus the largest municipality of Baden-Württemberg in the 1990s without town privileges, and so it received these on 1 January 2000. Despite its size, the city did not apply to become a district seat until 2004. Then, on 14 September 2004, it was decided that Rheinstetten became a district seat of 2005, by the order of the Baden-Württemberg Council of Ministers.

=== City Districts ===
==== Forchheim ====

In 1086 Forchheim was mentioned for the first time in an official document by Henry IV, Holy Roman Emperor; ‘Vorechheim’ was noted as a gift. Until 1100 Forchheim was the principle estate of "Ufgau", known as County Forchheim. The rule of this county was gradually taken from the Forchheim-Malch family and in 1086 came under the rule of the Roman Catholic Diocese of Speyer. Then Forchheim was given to Herman V (Margrave of Baden-Baden), then returned to the county and in 1219 passed back to Herman V (Margrave of Baden-Baden), who became the liege lord of Forchheim. Later, Forchheim came under the administration of Mühlburg and in the course of the division of lands it went to the Margraviate of Baden. At this time it belonged to the administration of Ettlingen. In 1921, it became part of the district office Karlsruhe, which in 1938 became the district Karlsruhe.

Since 1963 the head office of Bruker has been in Silberstreifen. Bruker is a manufacturer of scientific instruments for molecular and materials research and has over 4,000 employees..

==== Mörsch ====

In 940 Mörsch was mentioned as 'Meriske' in a document in which emperor Otto III gave the village to the Roman Catholic Diocese of Speyer. The Ministrialis of Mörsch, or the Eberstein family, ruled over the village in the 12th century. Eventually the village became the fiefdom of Margrave Hermann VIII of Baden). In 1306, he sold it to the Abbey of Herrenalb, but was able to buy it back in later years. Since 1291 most of the village belonged to the Weißenburg monastery, which then became the owner of the entire village in 1339. In 1350, Mörsch finally ended up in Baden, as part of the administrative district Mühlbürg. During the division of lands in 1535, Mörsch was handed over to the Baden-Baden family and thus belonged to the administration office of Ettlingen. After the dissolution of the administration office, Mörsch belonged to the district Karlsruhe.

==== Neuburgweier ====

In 1219 Neuburgweier was mentioned for the first time in an official document. The document discussed the distribution of the property of the Eberstein brothers. In 1383, Neuburgweier was handed over to the Electorate of the Palatinate. In 1396, the first mention of "Wilre" (meaning "Weiler") in an official document can be found. The name "Neuburgweiler" was mentioned in 1422. The village was always mentioned in connection with Neuburg am Rhein and thus belonged to the Palatine dsictrict Hagenbach-Germersheim. In the 16th century, Neuburgweier was separated from Neuburg through the natural change in the course of the Rhine. In 1674, French soldiers occupied the village and was handed over to the French in 1682. It remained in French hands until 1697. In 1707, through an exchange of estates, the village became part of the lands of the Margraviate of Baden-Baden (and thus belonged to the administrative district Ettlingen). After the dissolution of the district Ettlingen in 1937, it belonged to the district Karlsruhe.

On 1 January 1975, Forchheim, Mörsch and Neuburgweier gave up their autonomy and merged into the municipality of Rheinstetten.

=== Population development ===
Population figures according to city district Forchheim, Mörsch and Neuburgweier respectively. The numbers were taken from official population counts.

Date	Population
31 December 1975	17,936
31 December 1980	18,814
27 May 1987	19,065
31 December 1990	19,405
31 December 1995	20,046
31 December 2000	20,333
31 December 2005	20,406
31 July 2006	20, 299

=== Religion ===
The city council of Rheinstetten originally belonged to the Roman Catholic Diocese of Speyer. There is a church in Forchheim which is consecrated to Saint Martin and has existed since 1408. It was the main church of the parish of Forchheim, as well as Mörsch and Daxlanden (a city district that nowadays belongs to Karlsruhe). The parish church was under the patronage of Weissenburg Abbey and later the 'Schenken von Schüpf' family. Via the Counts of Zweibrücken, the diocese of Speyer became the patron of Rheinstetten. Because Mörsch and Forchheim had political bonds to Baden-Baden, which did not take part in the reformation, they stayed Catholic. Neuburgweier had been reformed due to its religious affiliation to the Palatinate region, but during the French occupation this was changed back.

Mörsch has had its own parish administration since the high-medieval period. The right of patronage first belonged to the Counts of Eberstein then in 1567 the Margraves of Baden became the patrons. Since the 15th century Neuburgweier has belonged to the parish of Mörsch. In the 17th century the parishes of Forchheim and Mörsch (aloing with Neuburgweier) were merged, but in 1907 this merger was undone. Until 1962 Neuburgweier belonged to Mörsch and then became its own parish.

The contemporary parish church of Forchheim was constructed by Johannes Ludwig Weinbrenner in 1857/1858. The forest chapel "Maria Hilf", which was built in 1950/51 and is situated in the village Silberstreifen, also belongs to the parish of Forchheim. The parish church in Mörsch, which is shaped like an early Christian Basilika, was built in 1846/47. The St. Ursula Chapel of Neuburgweier was first mentioned in 1495. In 1776 the nave was replaced and in 1871 the chapel was expanded and renovated in a neo-Gothic style. In 1952 the contemporary Catholic church St. Ursula was built. Since 18 September 2005 the three Catholic parishes together have constituted the Catholic pastoral care unit of Rheinstetten. Until 2008 it belonged to the deanery of Ettlingen. Since the reformation of deaneries, it belongs to the deanery of Karlsruhe of the archdiocese of Freiburg.

The priest Anton Fränznick, who was killed in the Dachau concentration camp because of his role in the resistance movement, worked in the 1920s and 30s in Mörsch.

After the second world war, Protestants also moved to Rheinstetten. Initially they were cared for by the neighbouring municipality of Durmersheim, which lies to the south of Rheinstetten. On 1 January 1971 the Protestant parish of Forchheim was established. Three years later this parish was assigned to the church district 'Alb-Pfinz' and renamed Rheinstetten. In 1979 a second rectorate for the districts Mörsch and Neuburgweier was established and in 1984 they established their own parish. The Protestant parish house in Forchheim was built in 1972. In 1981 Mörsch built their Protestant parish house. In Neuburgweier the Protestants obtained the old St. Ursula chapel in 1954, after the new construction of the Catholic St. Ursula church.

== Partner cities ==
Twin towns of Rheinstetten are

- Palca (Peru)
- Vecsés (Hungary)
- Navarrenx (France)

== Literature ==
- Landesarchivdirektion Baden-Württemberg (Hrsg.): Das Land Baden-Württemberg – Amtliche Beschreibung nach Kreisen und Gemeinden, Band V: Regierungsbezirk Karlsruhe; Stuttgart 1976, ISBN 3-17-002542-2.
- Stadt Rheinstetten (Hrsg.): 25 Jahre Rheinstetten. Eine Stadt, drei Ortsteile, viele Gesichter. Verlag Regionalkultur, Ubstadt-Weiher 2000, ISBN 978-3-89735-130-1. 120 S. mit 135 Abb.
- Geschichte der Stadt Forchheim, 1867, Digitalisat
