= Ettlingen =

- Town
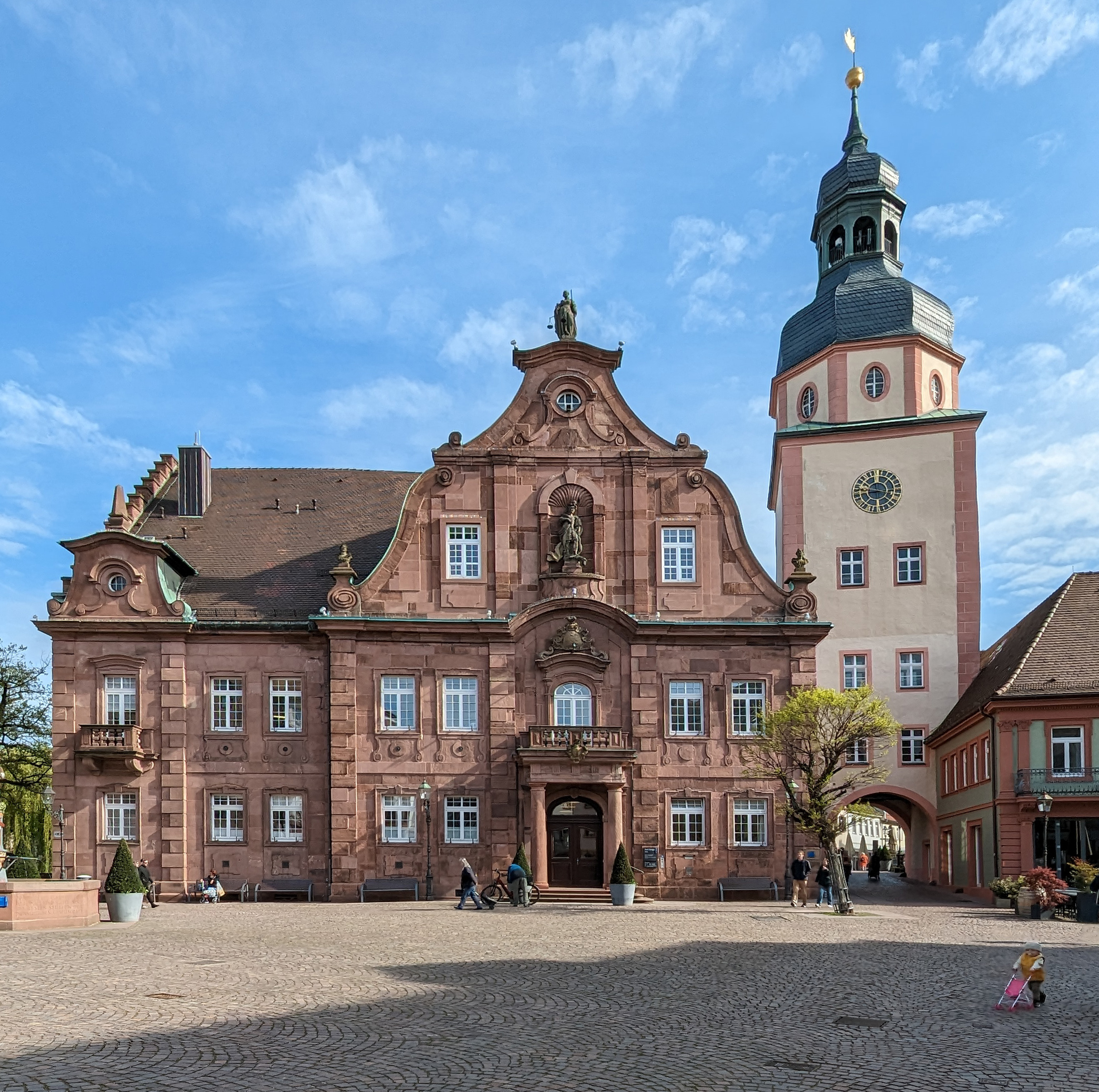

- Flag Coat of arms

- Location of Ettlingen within Karlsruhe district
- Interactive map of Ettlingen
- Location within Germany Location within Baden-Württemberg
- Coordinates: 48°56′N 8°24′E
- Country: Germany
- State: Baden-Württemberg
- Admin. region: Karlsruhe
- District: Karlsruhe
- Subdivisions: 7

Government
  - Mayor (2019–27): Johannes Arnold (Ind.)

Area
  - Total: 56.74 km^{2} (21.91 sq mi)
- Elevation: 133 m (436 ft)

Population (2025-12-31)
  - Total: 38,557
  - Density: 679.5/km^{2} (1,760/sq mi)
- Time zone: UTC+01:00 (CET)
  - Summer (DST): UTC+02:00 (CEST)
- Postal codes: 76275
- Dialling codes: 07243
- Vehicle registration: KA
- Website: www.ettlingen.de

Ettlingen (German pronunciation: [ˈɛtlɪŋən]; South Franconian: Eddlinge) is a town in Baden-Württemberg, Germany, about 8 kilometres (5 mi) south of the city of Karlsruhe and approximately 15 kilometres (9 mi) from the border with Lauterbourg, in France's Bas-Rhin department. Ettlingen is the second largest town in the district of Karlsruhe, after Bruchsal.

== Geography ==
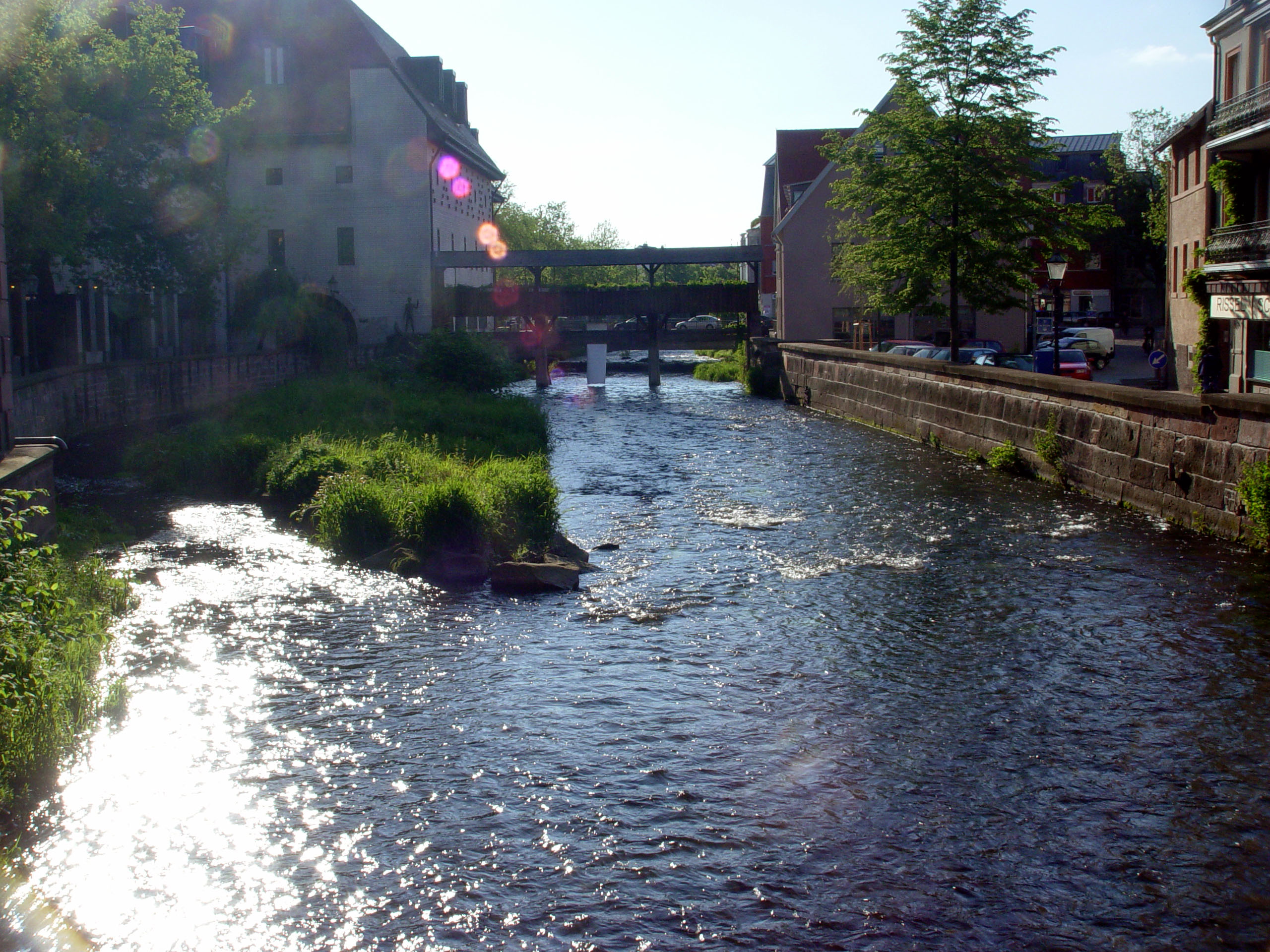
The Alb River in Ettlingen

Ettlingen is situated at the northern edge of the Black Forest on the Upper Rhine Plain. The Alb River arises in the hills of the Black Forest and flows through Ettlingen before emptying into the Rhine at Eggenstein-Leopoldshafen, making Ettlingen a central feature of the Albtal, the Alb Valley. Central Ettlingen and its largest constituent communities (Bruchhausen, Ettlingenweier, Oberweier) lie on the plain itself, but some of the villages (Spessart, Schöllbronn, and Schluttenbach) are nestled among the northernmost foothills of the Black Forest.

=== Neighbouring communities ===
The municipality of Ettlingen is bordered by the following communities, clockwise from the north: Karlsruhe, Waldbronn, Karlsbad (Baden), Marxzell, Malsch, and Rheinstetten, all of which belong to the district of Karlsruhe, except for the independent city of Karlsruhe itself.

=== Constituent communities ===
Since the major communal reforms enacted by Baden-Württemberg in the early 1970s, the municipality of Ettlingen has consisted of the town of Ettlingen itself and the communities of Bruchhausen, Ettlingenweier, Oberweier, Schluttenbach, Schöllbronn, and Spessart.

== History ==
Ettlingen was an important crossroads during Roman times, when the region was part of the province of Germania Superior. This is demonstrated by the many artifacts found in the area, including the "Neptune Stone," which commemorates a flood of the Rhine, and the remains of a Roman bath excavated beneath St. Martin's Church. The town was first mentioned in 788 as "Ediningom" in a deed of donation belonging to Weissenburg Abbey in Alsace (now in France). In 965, the village of Ettlingen ("Ediningom") received market rights (Marktrecht) from Emperor Otto the Great. In 1192, Emperor Henry VI, one of Frederick Barbarossa's sons. Margrave Herman V of Baden-Baden became Ettlingen's feudal lord in 1219. In the following centuries, Ettlingen developed into an important administrative centre within the Margraviate of Baden-Baden.

Ettlingen gave its name to a line of defensive earthworks known as the Ettlingen Line built to deter French aggression. During the Nine Years' War the town was nearly completely burned to the ground by the troops of Louis XIV, but was nevertheless rebuilt in the following decades under Margravine Sibylle Auguste. After the Catholic line of Baden-Baden died out in 1771, Ettlingen passed to the Protestant Margraviate of Baden-Durlach, which would become the reunited Margraviate of Baden. During the French Revolutionary Wars, Ettlingen was the site of a battle between elements of the French Army of the Rhine and Moselle and the Habsburg Army of the Upper Rhine on 9 July 1796. In the period of Napoleon's activities in Germany, Margrave Karl Friedrich of Baden was made Elector in 1806 and Grand Duke in 1806.

Ettlingen remained an independent town until 1937, when it was incorporated into the administrative unit that would become the district of Karlsruhe in 1939. Ettlingen and its surrounding villages and land continue to be part of this district.

In 1966, Ettlingen passed the 20,000 population mark and raised to the status of Große Kreisstadt by the state government of Baden-Württemberg. During the communal reforms of the early 1970s, several smaller communities were incorporated into Ettlingen, raising the population to over 30,000. Ettlingen's renowned open-air theater series, the Schlossfestspiele first took the stage in the Baroque inner courtyard of Ettlingen Palace in 1979.

=== Religions ===
Ettlingen was originally a part of the ancient Diocese of Speyer and was under the pastoral care of the Archdeacon of St. German and Moritz in Speyer. The town originally belonged to the deanery of Durlach but was itself made archdeaconate in the 16th century. The Protestant Reformation made gains in Ettlingen as early as 1520, but the town remained mostly Catholic, and the town's Catholic majority was supported by the Catholic line of Baden-Baden; later, starting in 1624, the Jesuits played an active role in converting many of the town's inhabitants back to the Catholic faith. By the beginning of the 19th century, Protestants were a small minority.

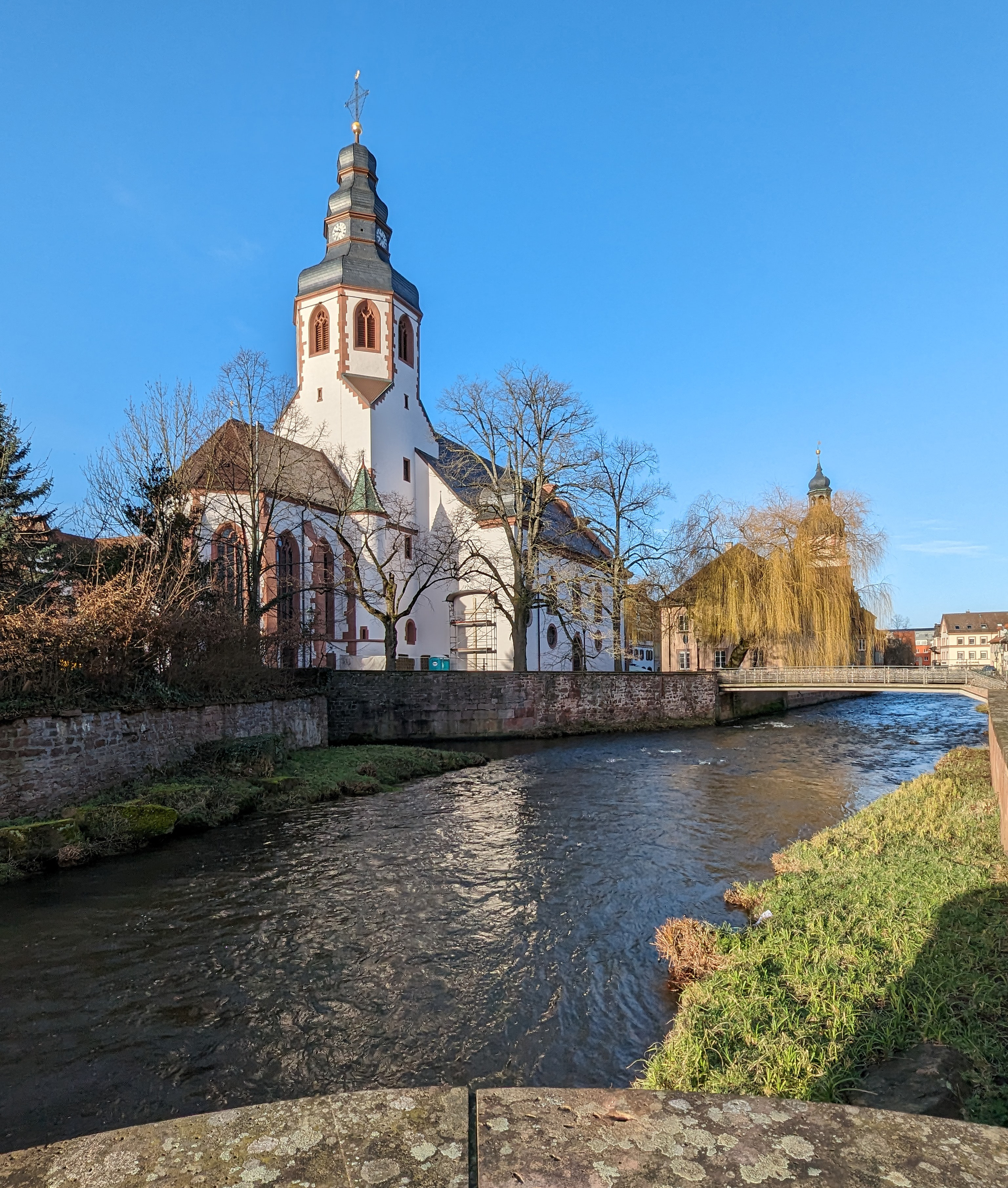
St. Martin's Church

During the period of secularization following the dissolution of the Holy Roman Empire, Ettlingen was part of the ordinariate of Bruchsal. In 1821, it became part of the newly founded Archdiocese of Freiburg, and the town was made the seat of a deanery, which included not only the parishes within Ettlingen proper, but also those in surrounding villages and neighboring municipalities. Today, Ettlingen belongs to the deanery of Karlsruhe, with the various parishes organized into pastoral units (Seelsorgeeinheiten). These include Ettlingen Stadt, with the parishes Herz Jesu (Sacred Heart), Liebfrauen (Our Lady), and St. Martin's, the town's oldest church; Ettlingen South, with St. Dionysius' in Ettlingenweier, St. Wendelin's in Oberweier, and St. Joseph's in Bruchhausen; and Ettlingen Heights, with St. George's in Völkersbach, St. Boniface's in Schöllbronn, and St. Anthony's in Spessart, although Völkersbach belongs politically to the municipality of Malsch.

Jewish families lived in Ettlingen since at least the 14th century. They lived primarily in Färbergasse ('Dyers' Alley), which was formerly known as "Judengasse" (Jews' Alley). The Jews of Ettlingen paid a protection tax of 16 florins in the 18th century, which was reduced to 8 florins in 1812. Ettlingen's first synagogue was built on Albstraße in 1849, only to be torn down again when a new synagogue was built on Pforzheimerstraße and dedicated in 1889. The "New Synagogue" was itself destroyed during the infamous Kristallnacht pogrom of November 1938. About two thirds of the remaining Jewish citizens of Ettlingen emigrated during the Nazi era and the rest were deported to concentration camps.

Protestants (Lutherans), most of whom had moved to Ettlingen since the early 19th century, were first administered from Rüppurr, but in 1848 they received their own clergyman, and in 1869 their own parish (Johannesgemeinde - Congregation of St. John), which soon got its own church, the oldest Protestant church in Ettlingen. The Johannesgemeinde belonged to the city deanery of Karlsruhe at first, but was later transferred over to the deanery of Alb-Pfinz with its seat in Pfinztal. The congregation continued to grow and was eventually divided in 1951, creating the Paulusgemeinde (Congregation of St. Paul). The Paulusgemeinde had a parish hall built in 1953, adding a bell tower in 1965. The Paulusgemeinde was split up in 1972 to create the Luthergemeinde (Luther Congregation), which caters to the Protestants of Ettlingen West, Bruchhausen, Ettlingenweier, and Oberweier. From 1969 to 2003, Ettlingen was the seat of the Evangelical (Lutheran) Church in Baden's district of Central Baden. However, in the wake of efforts to save money, this district was dissolved and Ettlingen incorporated into the district of North Baden.

Alongside the two major churches, there are also a few free churches and congregations, including a Free Evangelical congregation and the Liebenzell Congregation. The Jehovah's Witnesses, the New Apostolic Church, and a small Jewish community are also represented in Ettlingen.

== Districts ==
- Bruchhausen
- Ettlingenweier
- Oberweier
- Schluttenbach
- Schöllbronn
- Spessart

=== Rheinland Kaserne ===
Ettlingen is the location of Rheinland Kaserne. Formerly a German Army base, for many years after World War II Rheinland Kaserne was the home of several U.S. Army units and many Americans. In the mid-nineties, the U.S. Army handed the barracks back to Germany. It is now home to a private school, medical offices, a vehicle registration centre, new housing and the Kulisse movie theatre.

Among the U.S. Army units based in Rheinland Kaserne were the 78th Engineer Battalion and 44th Signal Battalion.

== Public transport ==
Trains on lines S1 and S11 of the Stadtbahn Karlsruhe call at the stops Ettlingen Erbprinz/Schloss, Ettlingen Wasen and Ettlingen Stadt. These lines operate over the Alb Valley Railway, an electric railway that links Karlsruhe to Bad Herrenalb (S1) and Ittersbach (S11).

Ettlingen is also served by the stations Ettlingen West and Bruchhausen (b Ettlingen) on the Rhine Valley Railway (Rheintalbahn), providing direct regional and Stadtbahn connections to Karlsruhe Hauptbahnhof to the north and to Malsch, Rastatt, Baden-Baden and destinations further south and in the Black Forest. Services calling at these stations include the Karlsruhe Stadtbahn lines S71 and S81.

The town is also served by several buses run by the Karlsruher Verkehrsverbund, with routes serving various neighbourhoods of Ettlingen, as well as more distant destinations like Durlach, Rheinstetten and Malsch.

In addition, Ettlingen is served by the KVV's on-demand transport service MyShuttle, which operates throughout the city and its districts during evenings, weekends and public holidays.

== Notable people ==
- Franciscus Irenicus (c. 1494–1553), theologian and historian
- Georg Wurster (1934–1977), police officer, victim of the Red Army Faction, was in the car of Siegfried Buback
- Simon Pierro (born 1978), magician and TV presenter
- Frank-Jürgen Richter (born 1967), founder and chairman of Horasis

=== Other personalities associated with the town ===
- Karl Albiker (1878–1961), sculptor and lithographer who lived most of his life in Ettlingen
- Natalia Avelon (born 1980), actress born in Breslau, but has lived since childhood in the Ettlingen district of Schöllbronn
- Alexis Agrafiotis (born 1970), is a German-Greek composer, conductor and pianist, who lived in Ettlingen in his youth.
- Christian Klar (born 1952), member of the Red Army Faction (2nd generation), went to school in Ettlingen
- Winfried Schäfer (born 1950), football coach
- Karl Steinbuch (1917–2005), pioneer of German computer science

== Twin towns – sister cities ==
Ettlingen is twinned with:

- Épernay, France (1953)
- Middelkerke, Belgium (1971)
- Clevedon, England, United Kingdom (1980)
- Löbau, Germany (1990)
- Gatchina, Russia (1992)
- Menfi, Italy (2007)

== Photo gallery ==
Ettlingen

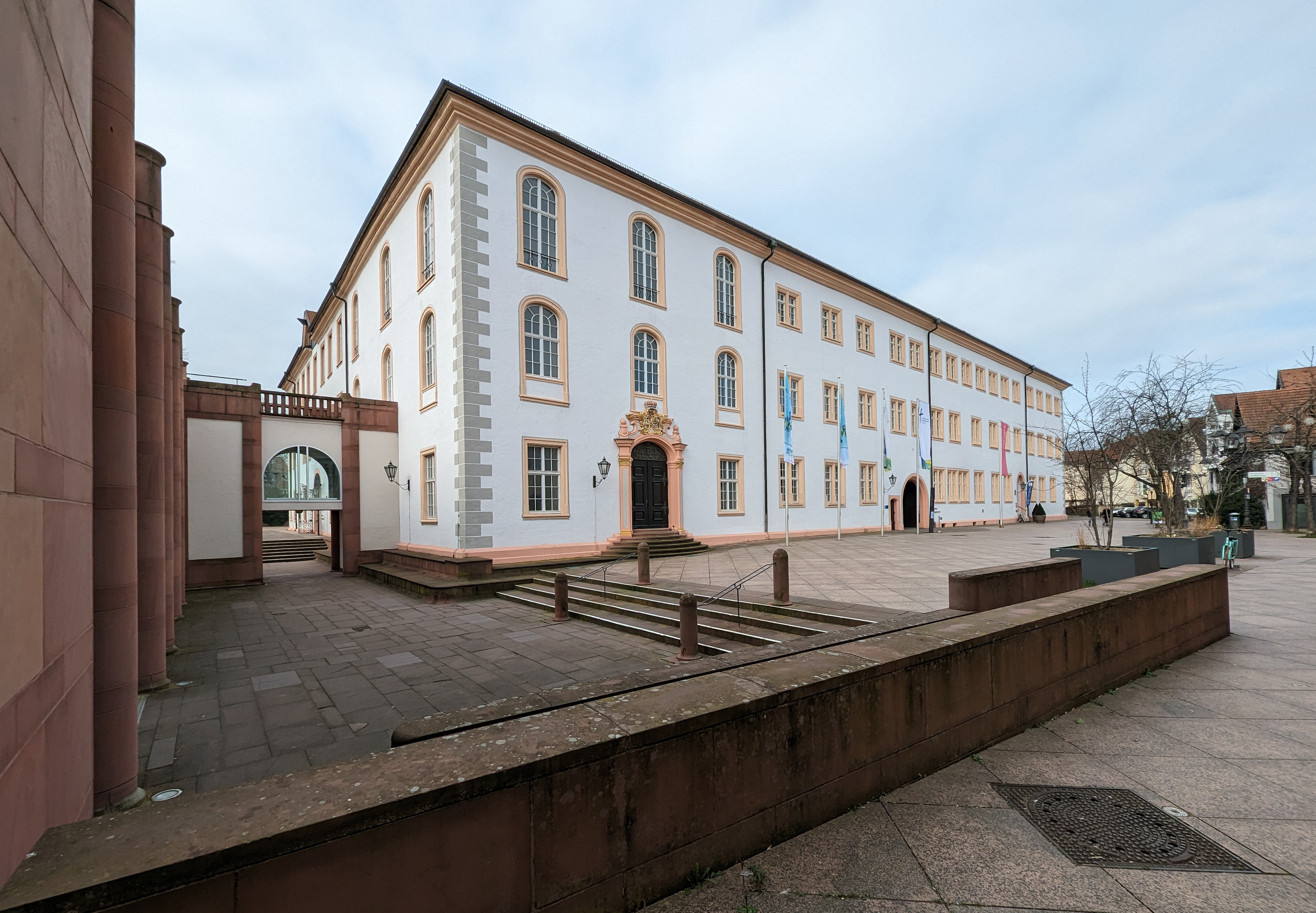
Castle

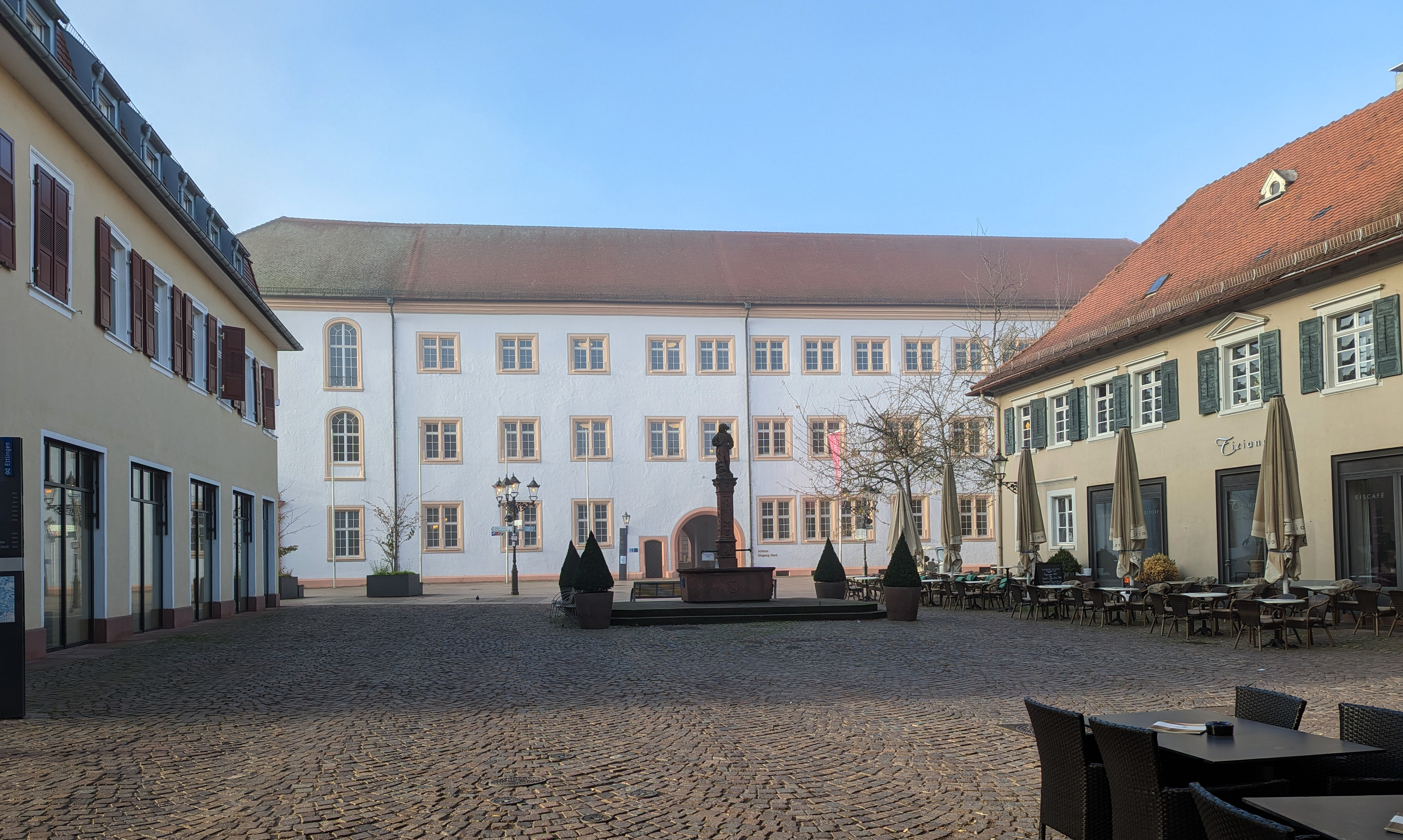
Castle

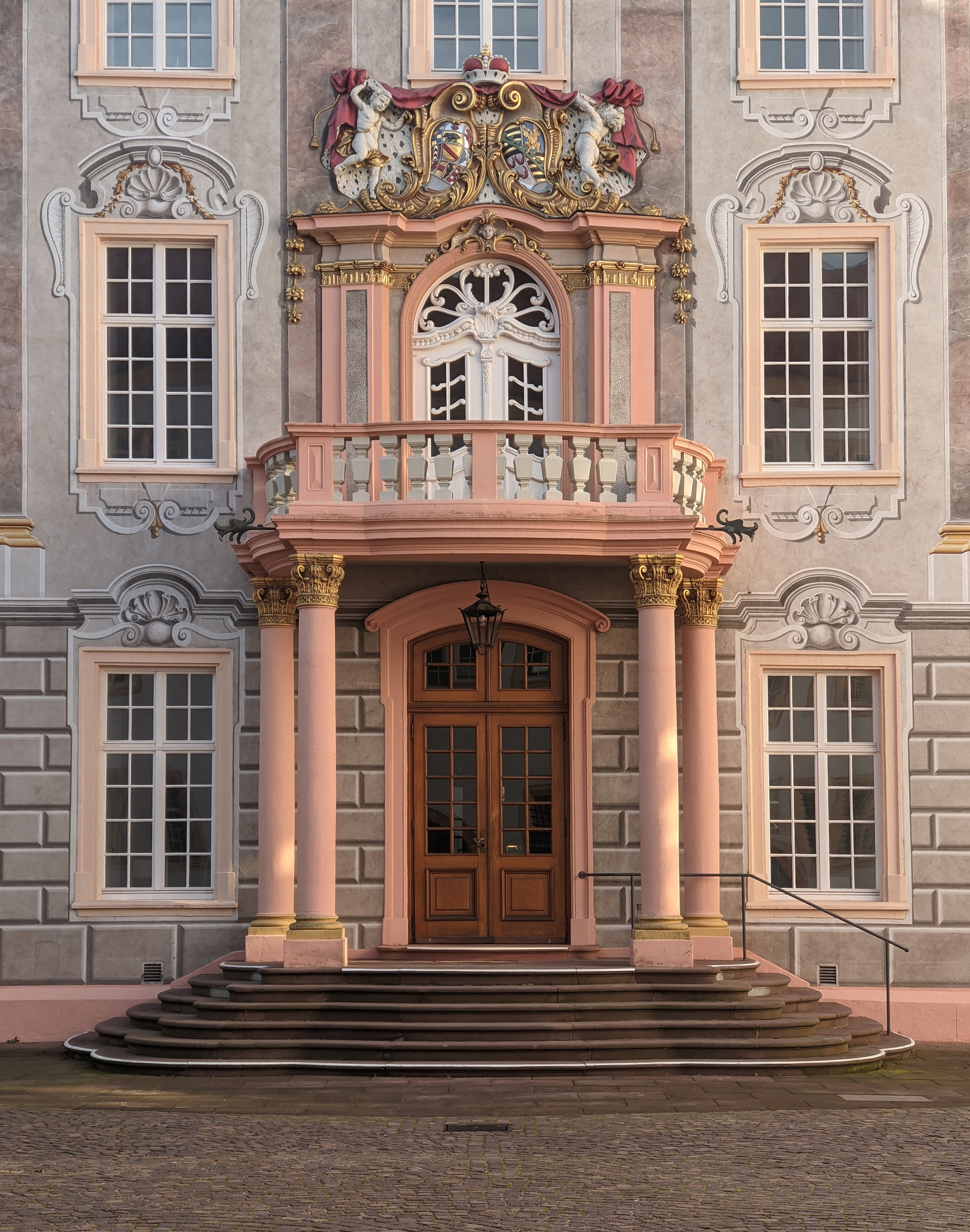
Inner court of the castle

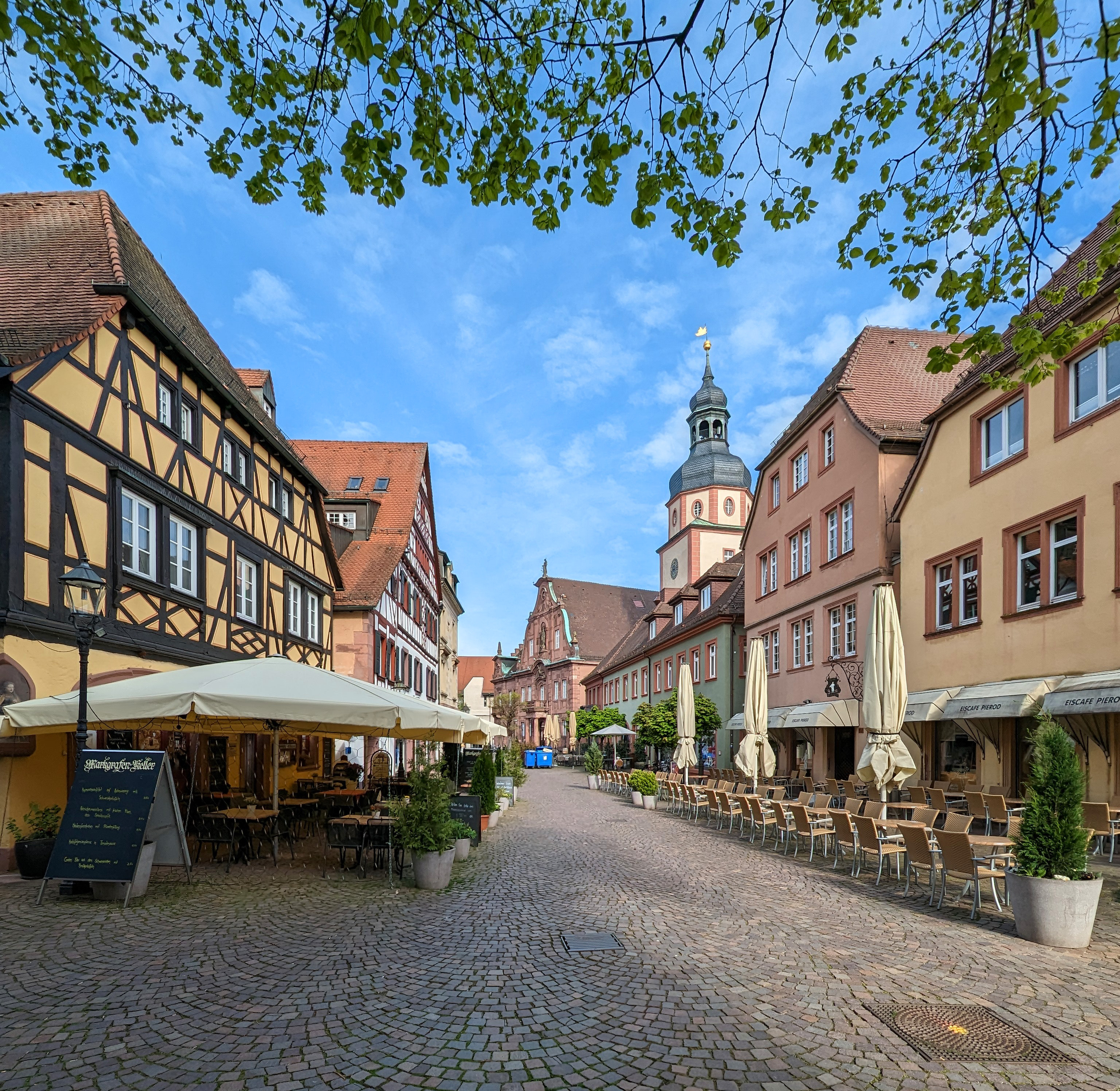
Church square

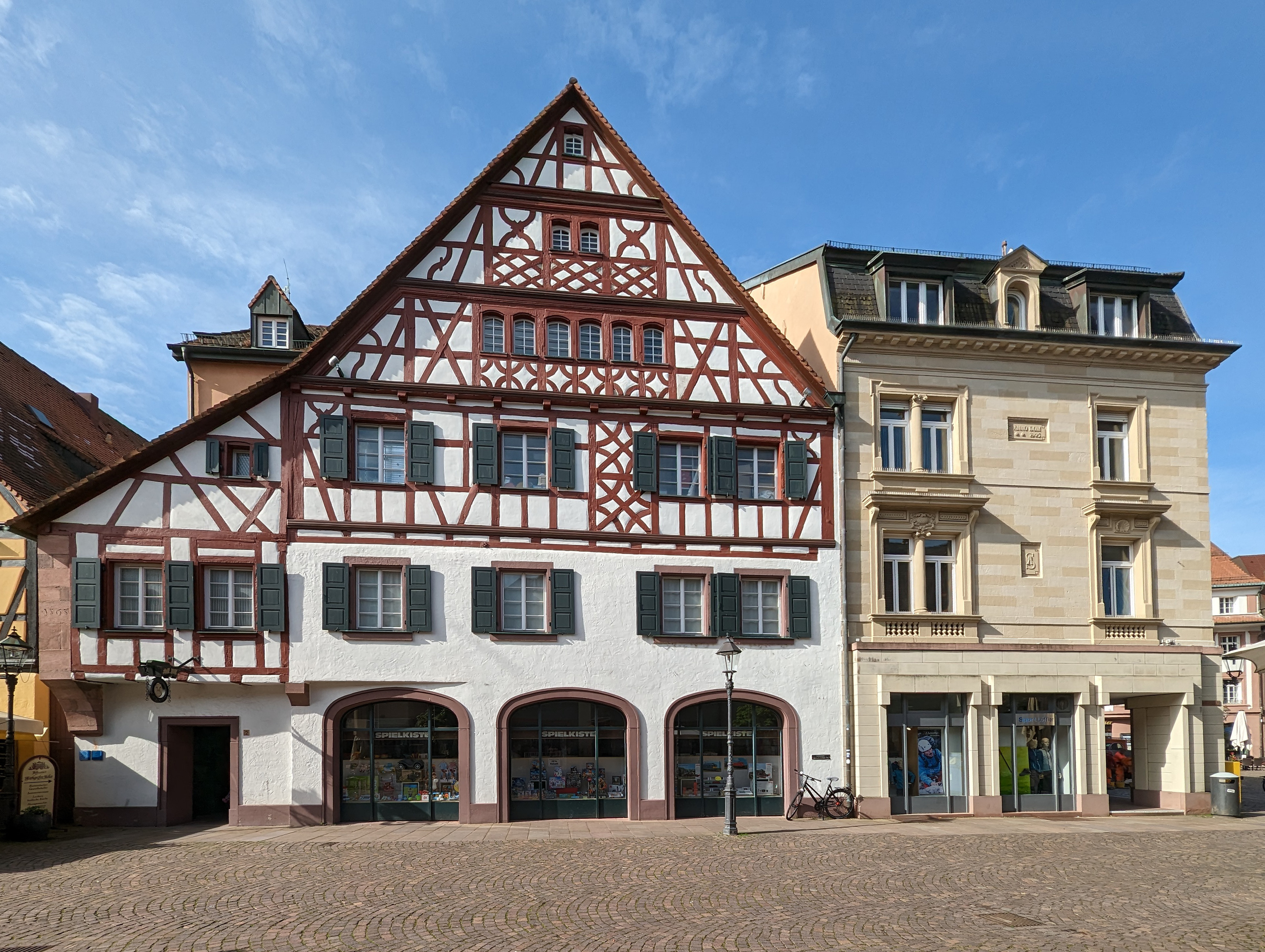
Church square

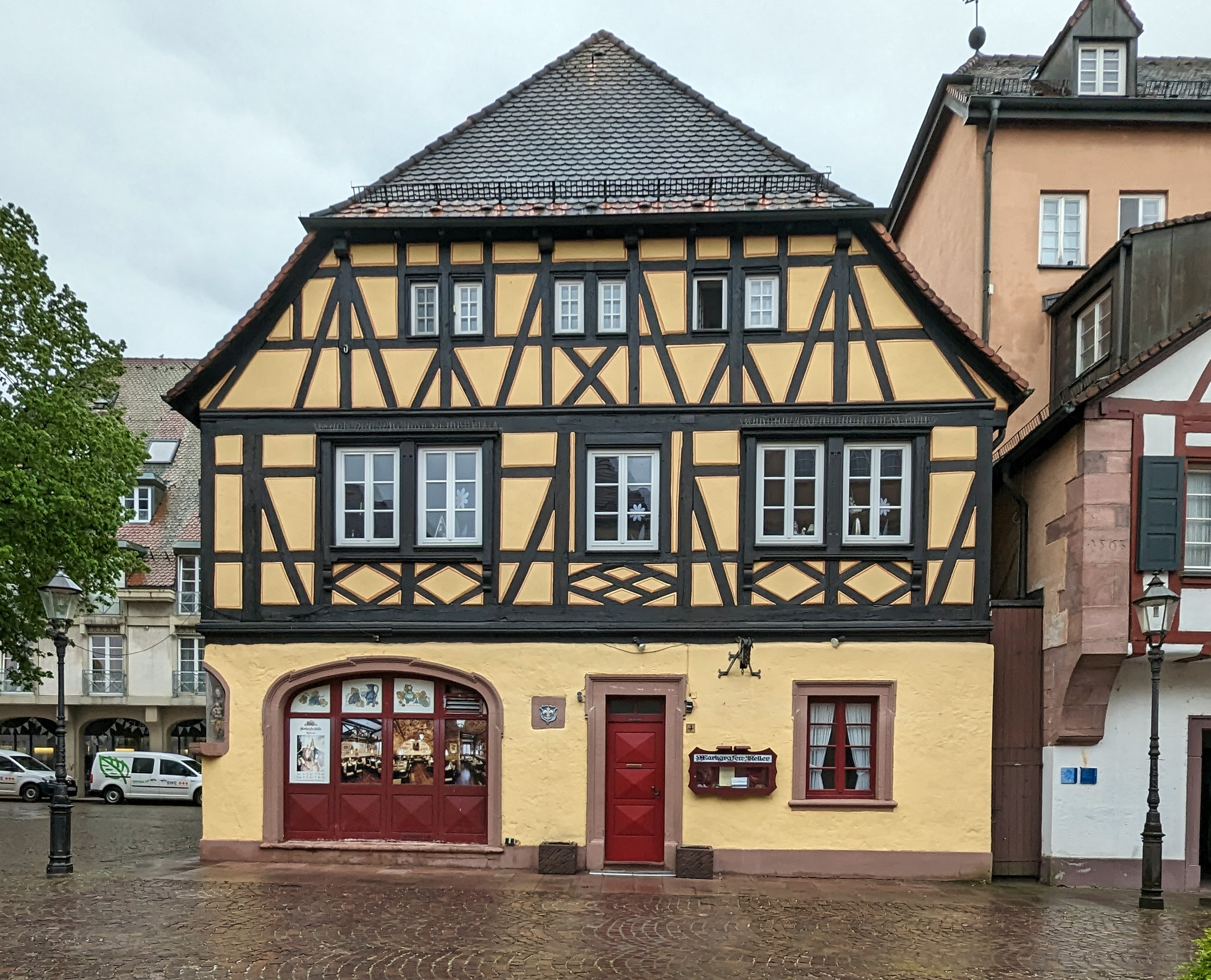
Church square

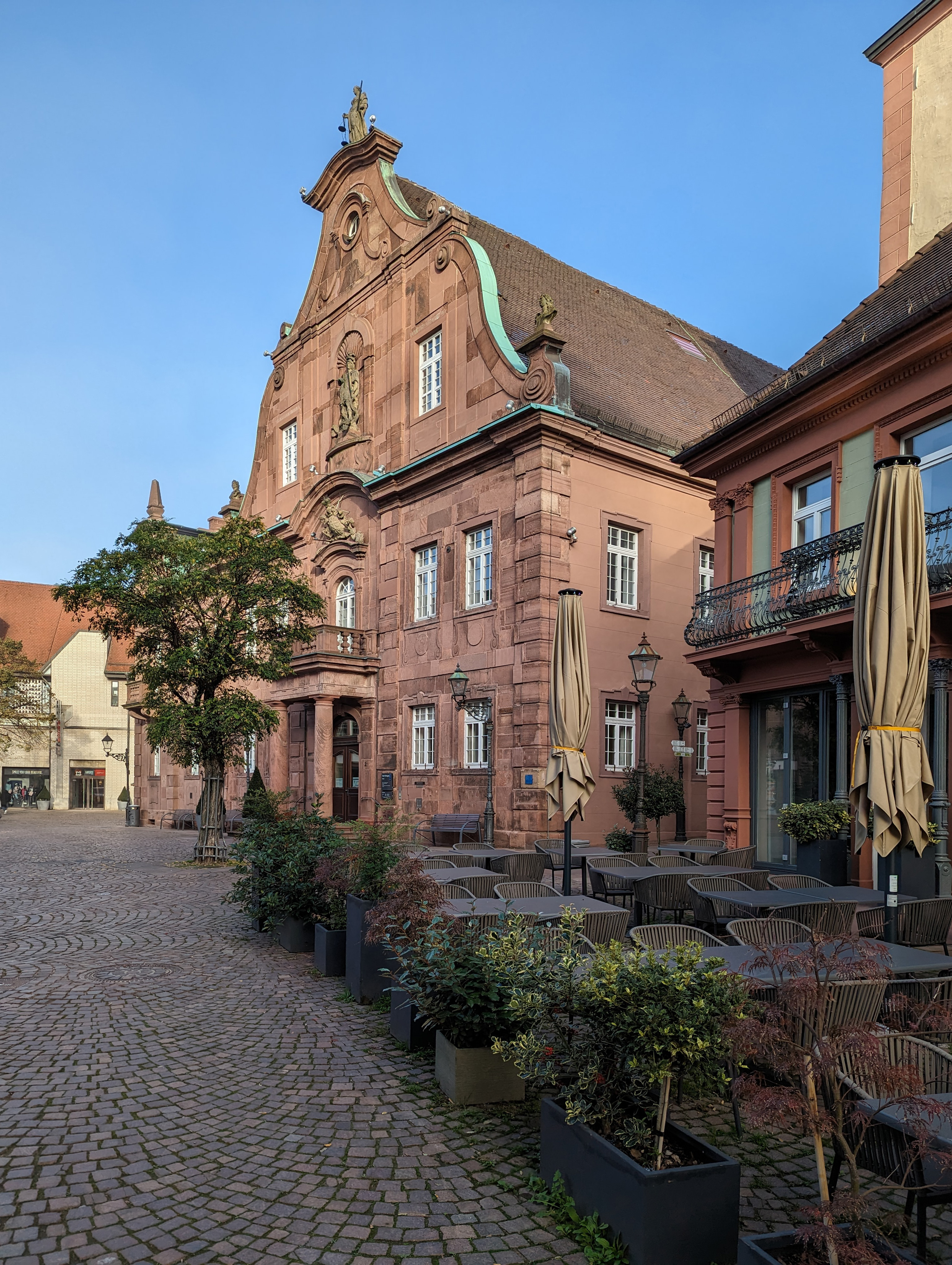
Town hall

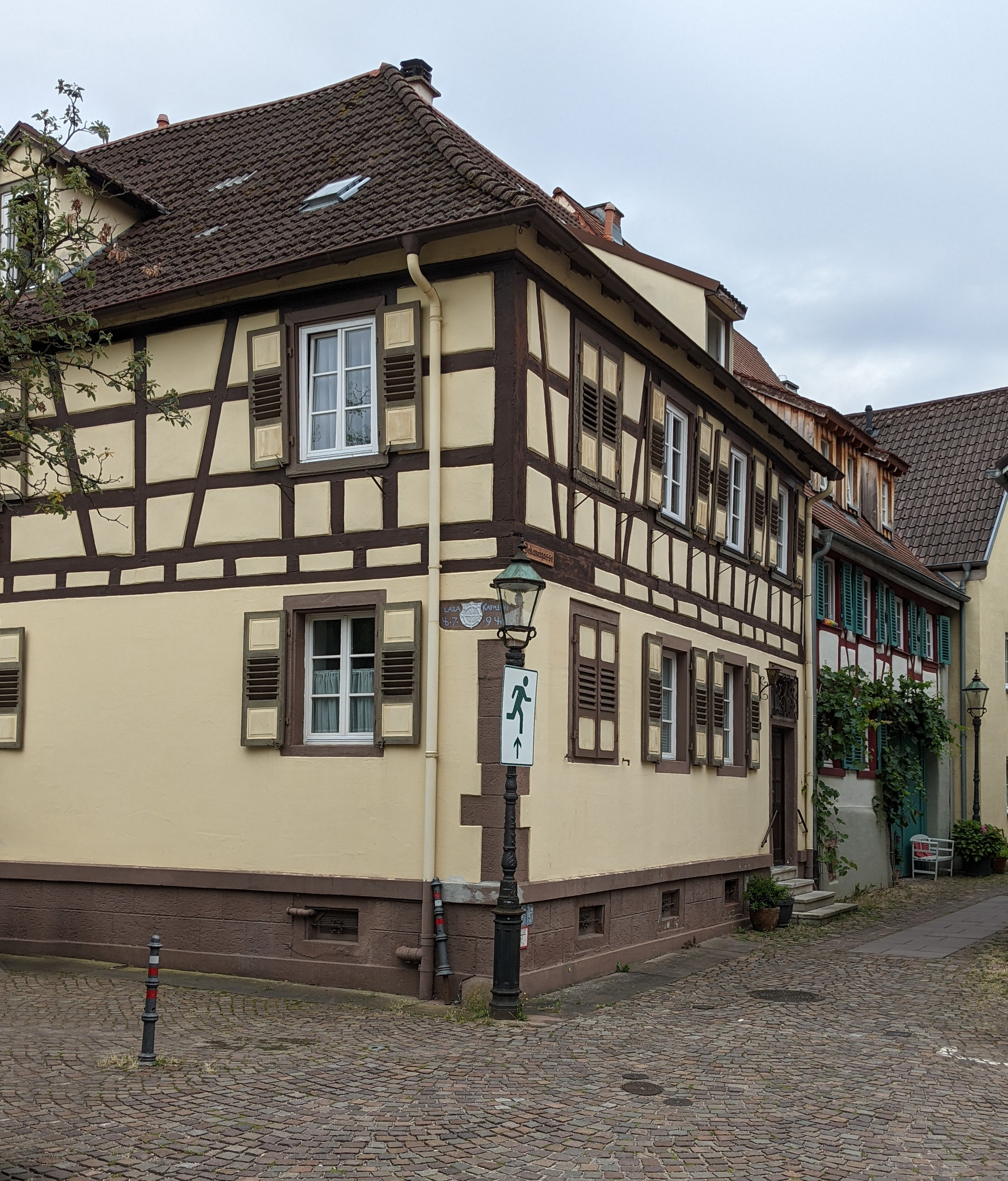
Dekaneigasse

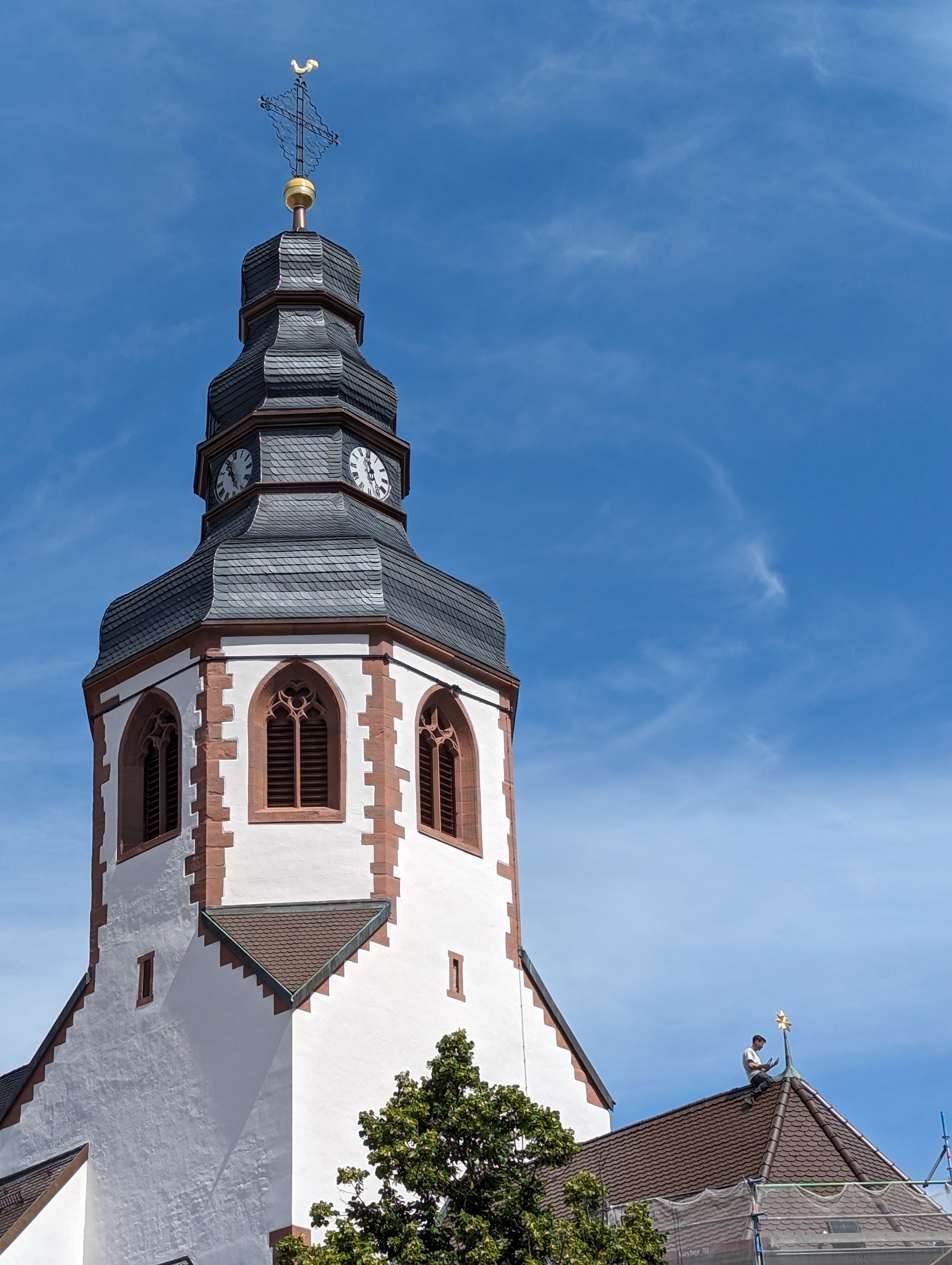
Church of Saint Martin

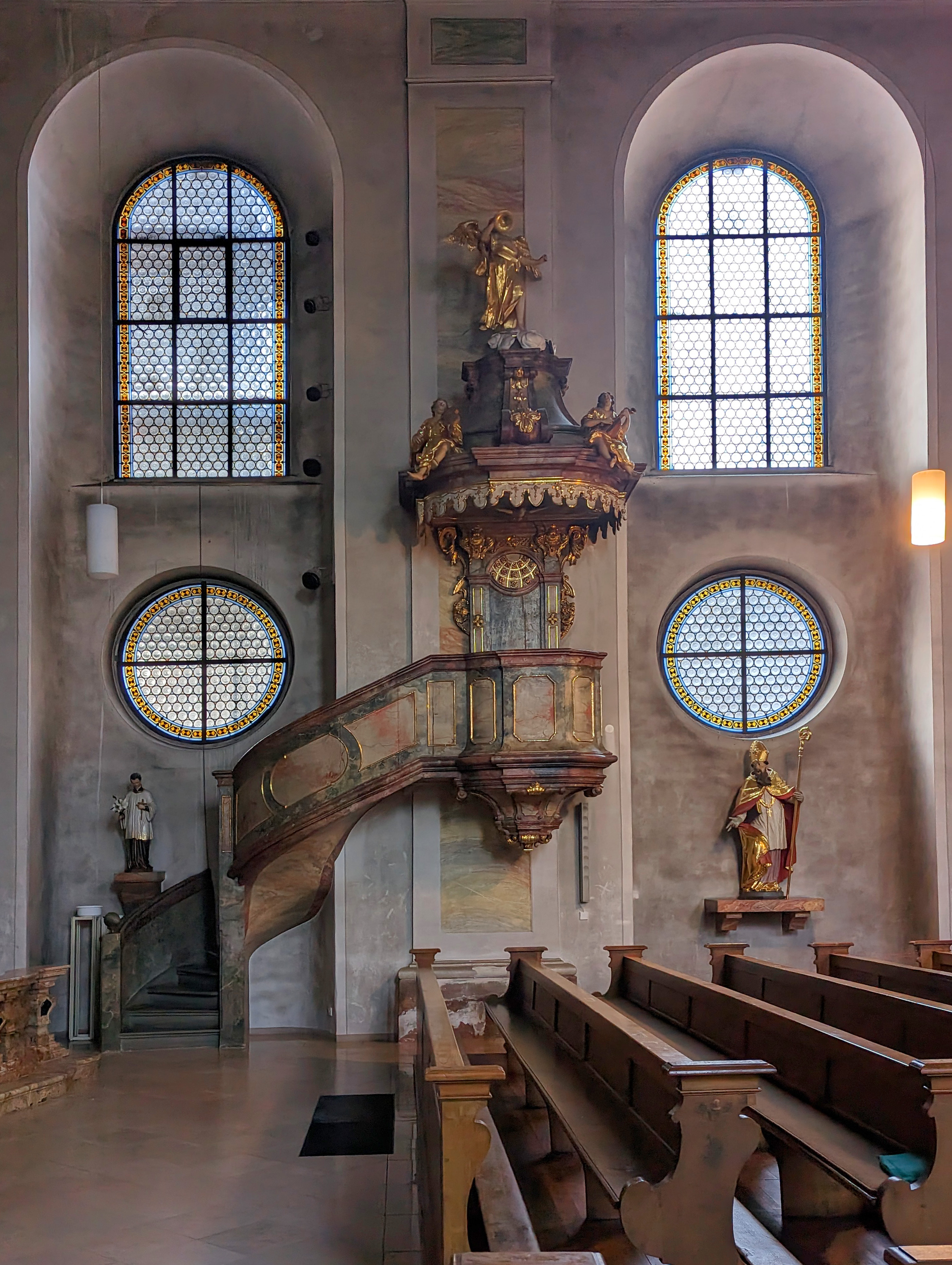
Church of Saint Martin

== See also ==
- Ottolenghi — an Italian-Jewish surname referencing Ettlingen
