= Irenicus =

Irenicus may refer to:

- Franciscus Irenicus, German humanist, Protestant reformer and historian.
- Jon Irenicus, the antagonist of Baldur's Gate II: Shadows of Amn.
