= Kunzenbach =

River in Germany

Coordinates: 48.9498°N 8.2707°E

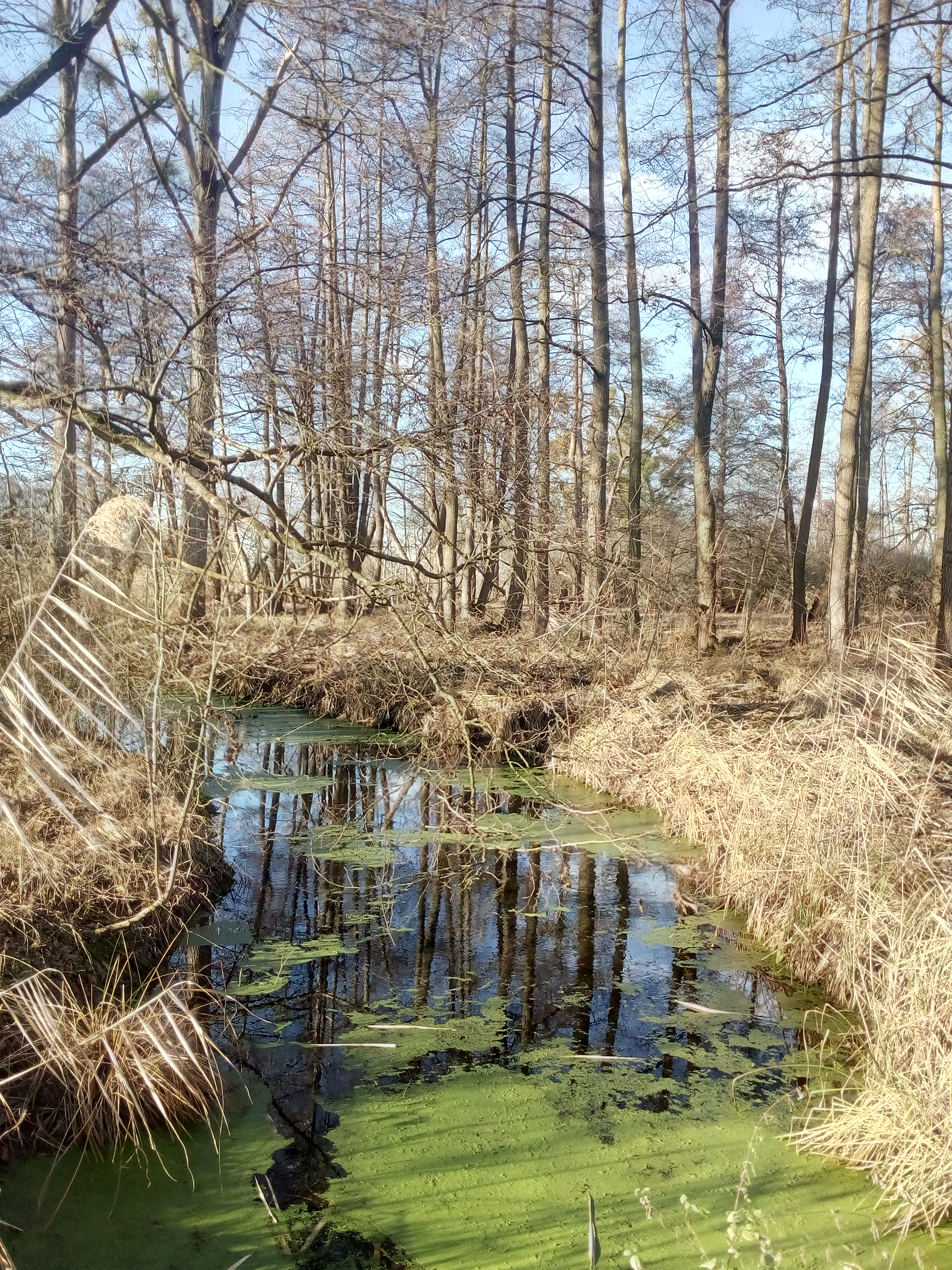

Location
- Country: Germany
- States: Baden-Württemberg

Kunzenbach is a small river of Baden-Württemberg, Germany. It is a branch of the Federbach near Durmersheim.

== See also ==
- List of rivers of Baden-Württemberg
