= Ottolenghi =

Ottolenghi, or Ottolengui, is a toponymic surname of Jewish-Italian origin which was originally an Italianised form of Ettlingen. Notable people with the surname include:

- Adolfo Ottolenghi (1885–1944), Jewish scholar and chief rabbi of Venice
- Emanuele Ottolenghi (born 1969), Italian political scientist
- Giuseppe Ottolenghi (1838–1904), Italian politician and military leader
- Rodrigues Ottolengui (1861–1937), American writer
- Yotam Ottolenghi (born 1968), Israeli-British chef, restaurant owner and food writer
