= Ferdinand von Malaisé =

Biography

- Ferdinand Malaisé ca. 1827
- Born: 23 February 1806; Linz am Rhein, Confederation of the Rhine
- Died: 29 June 1892; München, Bavaria
- Military career
- Service years: 1822-1872
- Rank: Lieutenant General
- Unit: 1st Royal Bavarian Field Artillery
- Known for: Tutor to King Ludwig III of Bavaria; Professor of Mathematics, Royal Bavarian Military Academy
- Awards: Knight of St. Joseph (Tuscany); Knight of the Iron Crown (Austria); Knight of the Order of Merit (Bavaria); Knight Commander, Military Order of Merit (Bavaria); Iron Cross, I & II Class (Prussia); Military Cross II Class (Mecklenburg-Schwerin); Military Medal (Lippe); Order of Ludwig, (Bavaria)

Ritter Ferdinand von Malaisé, (* 23 February 1806, Linz am Rhein, Germany – † 29 June 1892, Munich, Germany). Lieutenant General, 1st Royal Bavarian Field Artillery Brigade, Professor of Mathematics, Royal Bavarian Military Academy and tutor to Ludwig III, the last King of Bavaria.

== Biography ==
Ferdinand was the son of Christophe Malaisé of St Menges, France and Magdalena née Stephani of Mainz, Germany. Ferdinand's father was employed by the Rhine Customs Union (Rheinschifffahrts-Octroi), formed in 1804 by the French and Holy Roman Empires. In 1821, the family moved from Neuburg am Rhein to Germersheim.

In 1822 at the age of 16, Ferdinand joined the Bavarian Army in Landau near Germersheim. In 1825 he was posted to Munich. After being promoted to captain, Ferdinand became tutor to Ludwig III, the last King of Bavaria and his brother Prinz Leopold. After further promotions in 1853 and 1861, Ferdinand was awarded the Royal Bavarian Order of Merit and the title of Ritter in 1862. In 1870 he was appointed Commander, 1st Royal Bavarian Field Artillery Brigade and director of Field Artillery, 1st Royal Bavarian Corps during the Franco-Prussian War (19 July 1870 – 10 May 1871). In 1887 he was enrolled in the hereditary nobility of Bavaria. He died in June 1892 and is buried in the Alte Südfriedhof in München, Germany.

== Family & Descendants ==
Ferdinand married Adelheid Wibmer (1808–1887), daughter of the court official Sebastian Alois Wibmer, on November 25, 1830, in Munich. The couple had four sons and three daughters. Two sons and one grandson were also Generals in the Bavarian Army; General of Artillery Eugen von Malaisé (1835–1915), Major General Maximilian von Malaisé (1844–1921) and Major General Karl von Malaisé (1868–1946) who married Renata von Miller, daughter of the bronze caster Ferdinand von Miller, in Karneid in 1906.

There is no connection between Ferdinand's family and the de la Malaise family, seigneurs in Lavoir in the 16th century.
