= Simon Pierro =

German magician and TV presenter (born 1978)

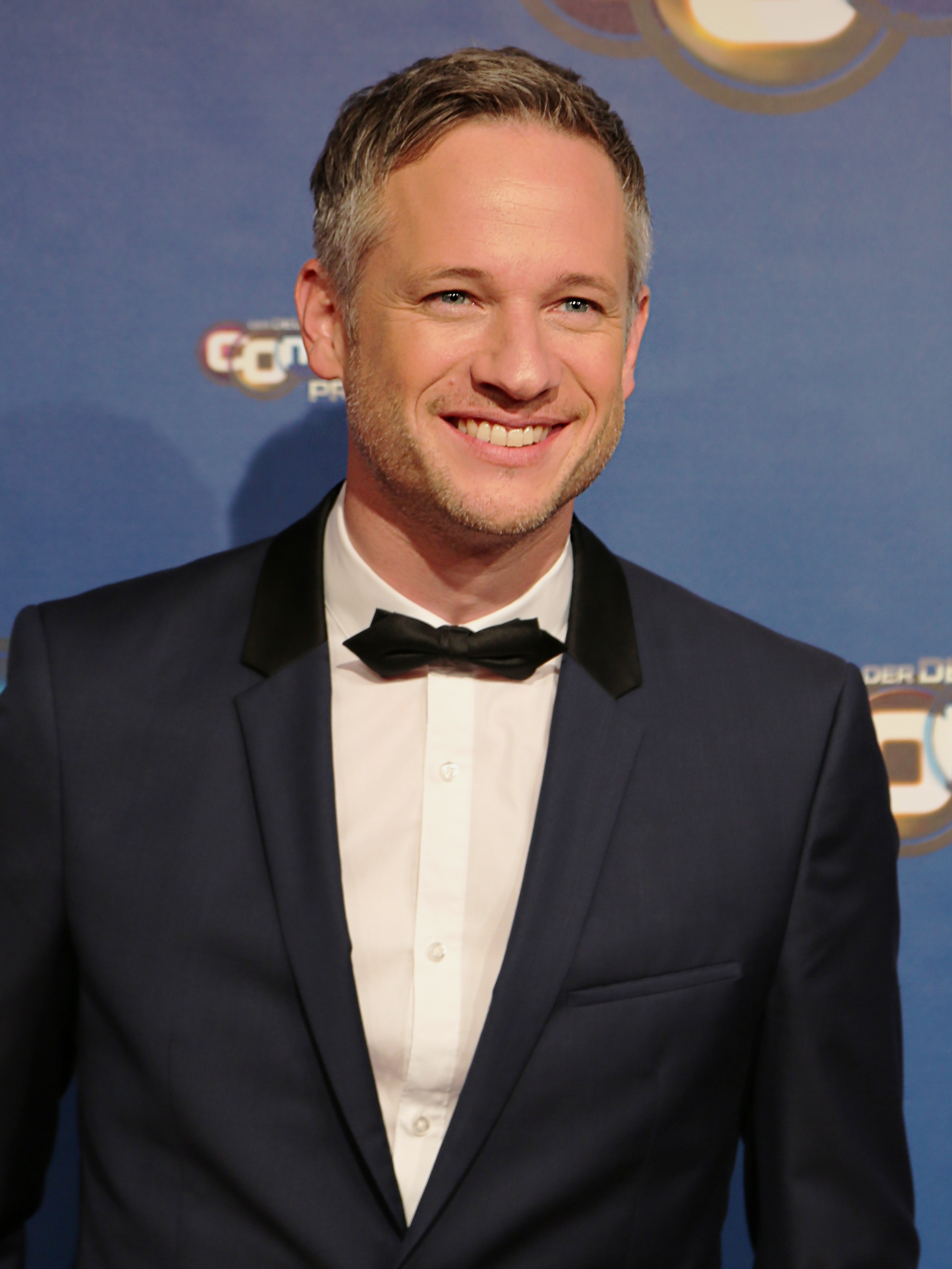
- Pierro in 2017
- Born: October 2, 1978 (age 48); Ettlingen, West Germany
- Occupation: Magician

Simon Pierro (born October 2, 1978 in Ettlingen) is a German magician and TV presenter.

== Life ==
Simon Pierro grew up in Waldbronn (Baden-Württemberg), South Germany and now lives in Munich. At the age of 15, he was conned out of $20 by a street magician playing a shell game on the streets of New York City. As a result of this encounter, Simon's sister gave him a book about magic and card tricks, where his passion for magic was ignited.

Simon Pierro's presentations include modern elements of popular culture and have little to do with the cliché of the "magician with tailcoat and top hat." With his stage show "The American Dream - From Rags to Riches," developed together with director Eberhard Riese, he has won several magic awards. In 2002, the Magic Circle of Germany voted him Magician of the Year. Among other successes he became the German champion and award-winner in the World Championships of Magic (FISM). In 2004, he received the Siegfried & Roy Award in Las Vegas.

Shortly after finishing his studies of Business Administration and Engineering at the University of Karlsruhe, Simon was invited by Frank Elstner to his German network TV show Menschen der Woche (people of the week). Afterward, he was also chosen to perform on Elstner's Saturday evening show Verstehen Sie Spaß? (the German equivalent of Candid Camera), where he earned his own part as magic decoy and has since played magic pranks in more than 20 episodes to date.

In addition to other worldwide TV appearances, he works off-camera as a consultant and, for example, developed an illusion for Heidi Klum's Germany's Next Top Model.

Since 2008 he has been heavily involved in digital magic, a combination of magic and technical innovation. Pierro is now known as "The iPad Magician," and was the first German magician to be invited to an Apple Store. He uses Apple's tablet and sleight of hand techniques to make objects appear to be pulled out of the iPad, sometimes appearing to have psychokinesis connecting the iPad into the real world. One of his signature illusions is to attach a beer tap to the screen of an iPad and then to serve glasses of beer to audience members from it.

With video clips such as "Preview of iOS 5" and "iPad Horror," videos of Pierro's iPad magic act have seen notable success online, with views topping 80 million as of June, 2015.

After an appearance on The Ellen DeGeneres Show, a video of his performance on that broadcast was viewed on YouTube more than 20 million times, more than any magician who has ever appeared on Ellen's show.

He has also appeared on Angry Birds Toons, as the Official Angry Birds Magician. His latest promotional appearances have been with LEGO, performing his iPad magic where he builds various LEGO objects on-screen and then hands them to children.
