= Durmersheim =

- Municipality
- Coat of arms

- Location of Durmersheim within Rastatt district
- Interactive map of Durmersheim
- Location within Germany Location within Baden-Württemberg
- Coordinates: 48°56′18″N 08°16′37″E
- Country: Germany
- State: Baden-Württemberg
- Admin. region: Karlsruhe
- District: Rastatt

Government
  - Mayor (2022–30): Klaus Eckert (SPD)

Area
  - Total: 26.15 km^{2} (10.10 sq mi)
- Elevation: 119 m (390 ft)

Population (2025-12-31)
  - Total: 11,747
  - Density: 449.2/km^{2} (1,163/sq mi)
- Time zone: UTC+01:00 (CET)
  - Summer (DST): UTC+02:00 (CEST)
- Postal codes: 76448
- Dialling codes: 07245
- Vehicle registration: RA
- Website: www.durmersheim.de

Durmersheim is a small town in the district of Rastatt, Baden-Württemberg, Southwest Germany and has a population of 12,112 (2020).

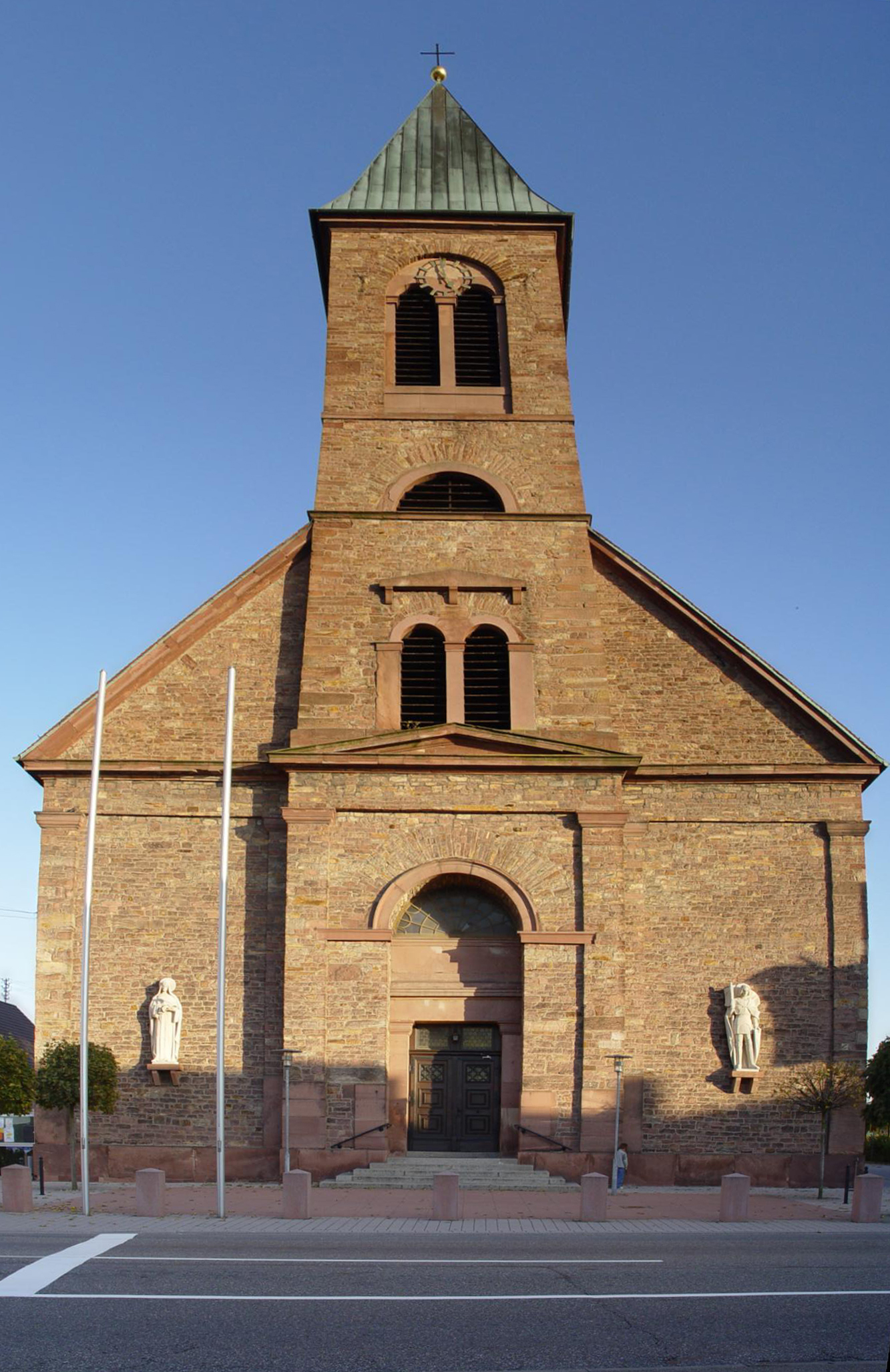
The church of St. Dyonis

Durmersheim is situated between Karlsruhe and Rastatt, in the valley of the river Rhine near the border to France. There is also a forest in the valley, named Hardtwald, c. 2 km east of the town.

Durmersheim is twinned with Littlehampton, a town in West Sussex, England.

== History ==
Founded about 600 BC, the city was occupied by duke Otto of Worms in 985. Since 1300 Durmersheim belonged to the margraves of Baden.

As Germany was subdued and divided into control zones by the Allied forces after World War II, the border of the French zone and American zone was between Durmersheim and Rheinstetten.

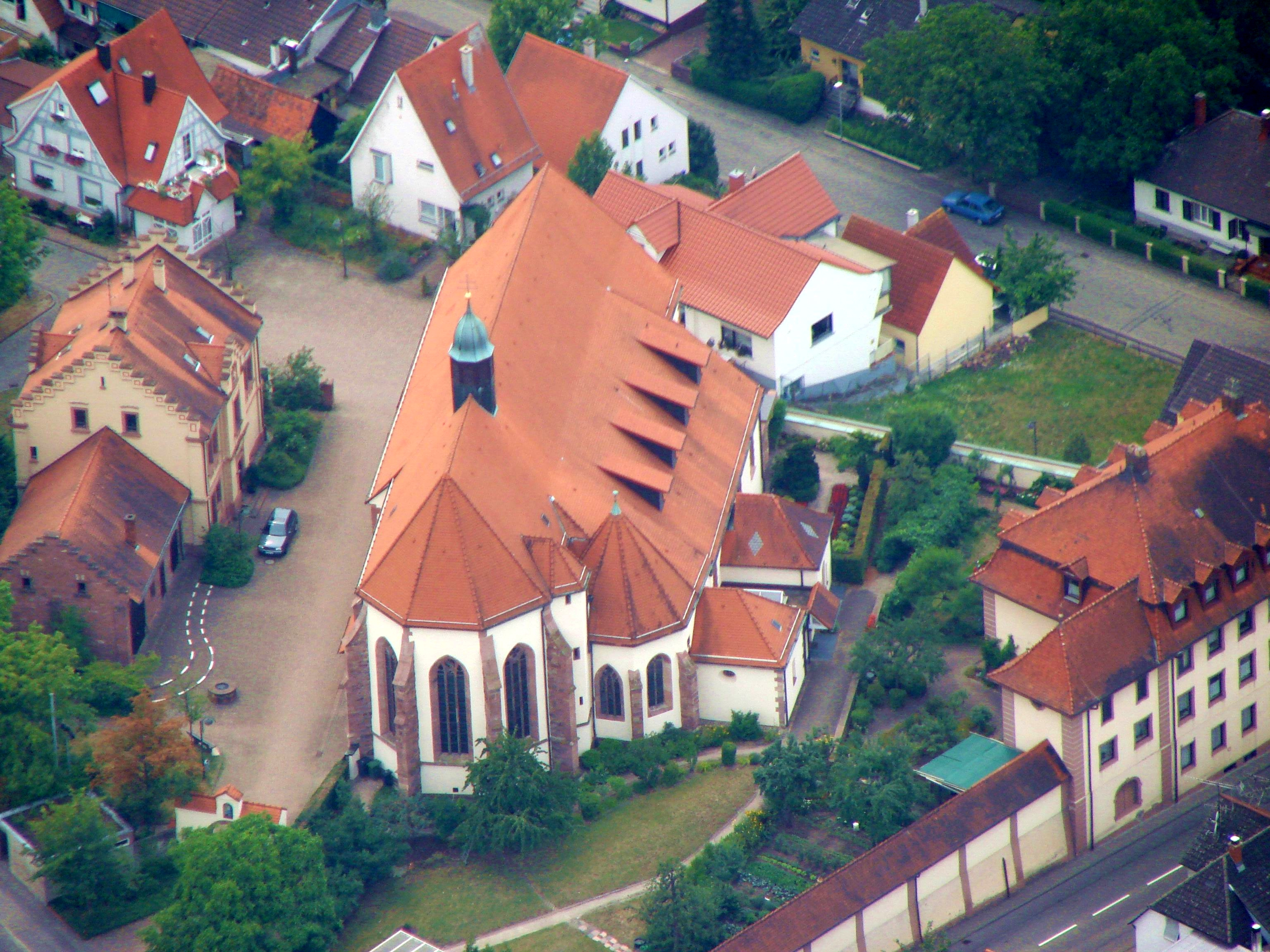
Pilgrim church Maria Bickesheim

== Mayor ==
Since 2006 Andreas Augustin is the mayor of Durmersheim. He was reelected in 2014 with 54,38 % of the votes.

== Main sights ==
The church of Bickesheim, built in the 13th century, is a well known place of pilgrimage.

== Economy and infrastructure ==
The largest employer in the Durmersheim area is Daimler AG, which has large plants in Rastatt, Gaggenau and Wörth.

Durmersheim has two stops on the Mannheim–Rastatt railway line. The Bundesstraße B 36 runs near Durmersheim.

In May 2026, a project has started to build seven wind turbines with a combined capacity of 50 megawatts.
