= Horasis =

Swiss-based think tank

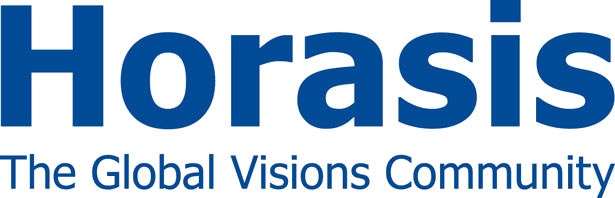
- Formation: 2005; 21 years ago
- Founder: Frank-Jürgen Richter
- Type: Nonprofit think tank
- Headquarters: Zurich, Switzerland.
- Region served: Worldwide
- Official language: English
- Executive Chairman: Frank-Jürgen Richter
- Website: www.horasis.org

Horasis is an independent, international economic think tank, headquartered in Zurich, Switzerland. Founded in 2005, by Frank-Jürgen Richter, former director of the World Economic Forum, Horasis' stated goals are innovation and sustainable development of emerging markets. The annual Horasis Global Meeting in Cascais, Portugal, is a gathering of business people with government officials, scientists and intellectuals centered on issues concerning corporations and societies.

== Activities ==
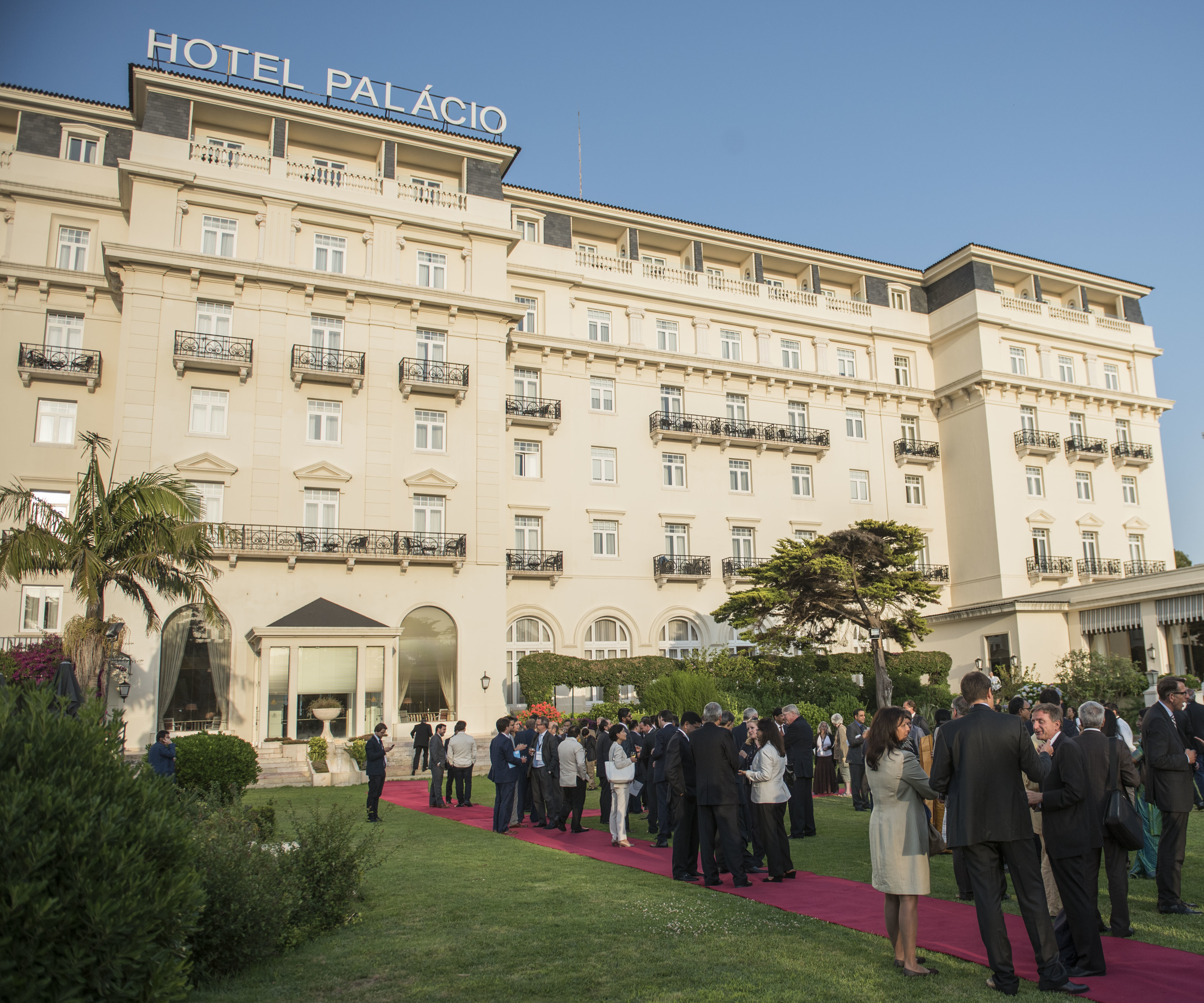
Horasis Meeting reception at the Hotel Palácio Estoril, in Cascais, on the Portuguese Riviera, near Lisbon.

Horasis serves as a platform for cooperation and knowledge sharing, connecting developed countries and emerging markets. The community primarily operates through partnerships with corporations, governments, and international organizations, often acting as an incubator for new initiatives. These meetings rotate among host countries that organize the events, with selected corporations contributing speeches and presentations on current topics.

Horasis meetings typically take place in a host country that is different from the geographic location of the "in-focus" nation. These events allow "in-focus" guests, such as China, India or Southeast Asian countries, to enhance their global relations and demonstrate soft power through collaboration and cooperation. The meetings also allow the host country to engage in policy dialogue with the guest countries.

=== Publications ===
Horasis publishes reports based on the meetings, contributes op-eds to the international press and expert opinions for TV news programs.

=== Business Leaders of the Year ===
Horasis awards the "Business Leaders of the Year" award for entrepreneurs who have been building and leading successful global firms. The award was first given in 2006. The award ceremonies take place at the regional meetings.

== Global meeting ==
The annual Horasis Global Meeting is a gathering of business people with government officials, scientists and intellectuals. Around 500 participants from 70 countries gather every year to discuss issues concerning corporations and societies. Issues such as economic growth, innovation, migration and inequality usually figure in the debates.

The Global Meeting was first held in Liverpool in 2016, and since 2017 is held annually in Cascais, Portugal. However, in 2023, the meeting was scheduled to be held in Gaziantep, Turkey.

== Regional meetings ==
Horasis holds the Horasis China Meeting, the Horasis India Meeting and the Horasis Asia Meeting on an annual basis. In 2017, the Horasis China Meeting was for the first time held in Sheffield, UK, and was attended by more than 300 Chinese business people, including representatives from state-owned companies, investment funds and private firms, as well as their British counterparts. The international Horasis India Meeting is attended by hundreds of business people and politicians from India and around the world. The Horasis Asia Meeting in 2017 was co-hosted by the Government of West Bengal and the Indian Chamber of Commerce (ICC). The Horasis Asia Meeting in 2018 and 2019 were both held in Binh Duong New City in Bình Dương Province, Vietnam.
