= Franciscus Irenicus =

Franciscus Irenicus, byname of Franz Friedlieb (1494/1495 – 1553) was a German humanist, Protestant reformer and historian.

He was born in Ettlingen and died in Gemmingen. He studied at the famous Latin school in Pforzheim, where Philipp Melanchthon was a fellow student in 1508-09. As a patriotic humanist he describes Germany in twelve books: Germaniæ exegeseos volumina duodecim a Francisco Irenico Ettelingiaco exarata, which appeared in Hagenau in 1518.
