= Adolfo Ottolenghi =

Italian rabbi (1885–1944)

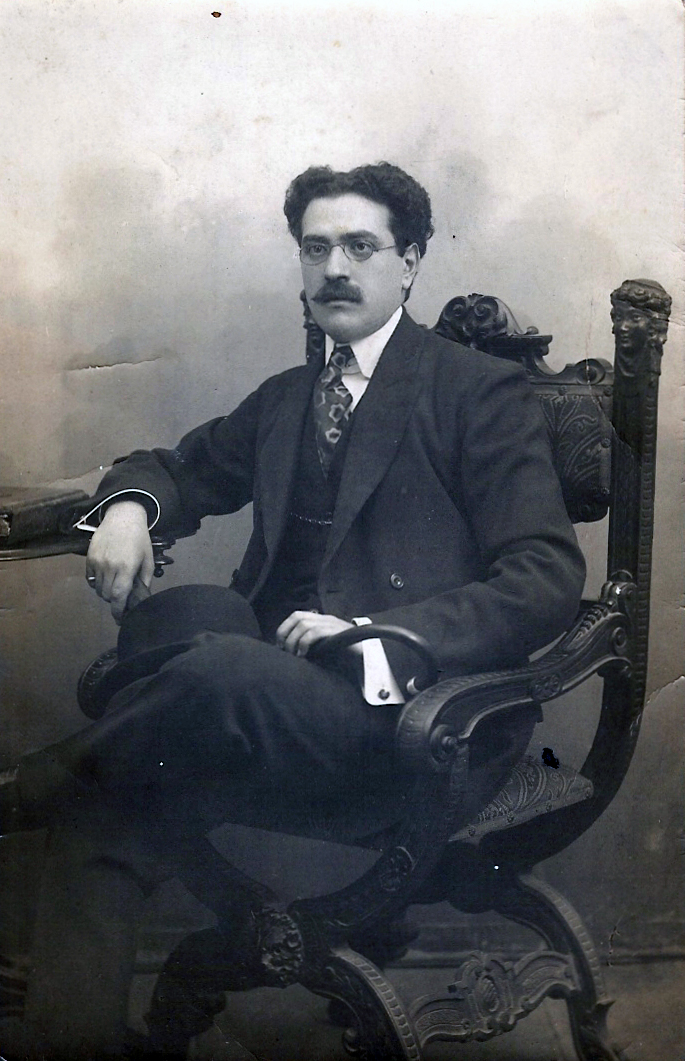
- Born: 30 July 1885; Livorno
- Occupation: Rabbi

Adolfo Ottolenghi (30 July 1885 – 2 September 1944) was an Italian rabbi and victim of the Holocaust.

== Early life ==
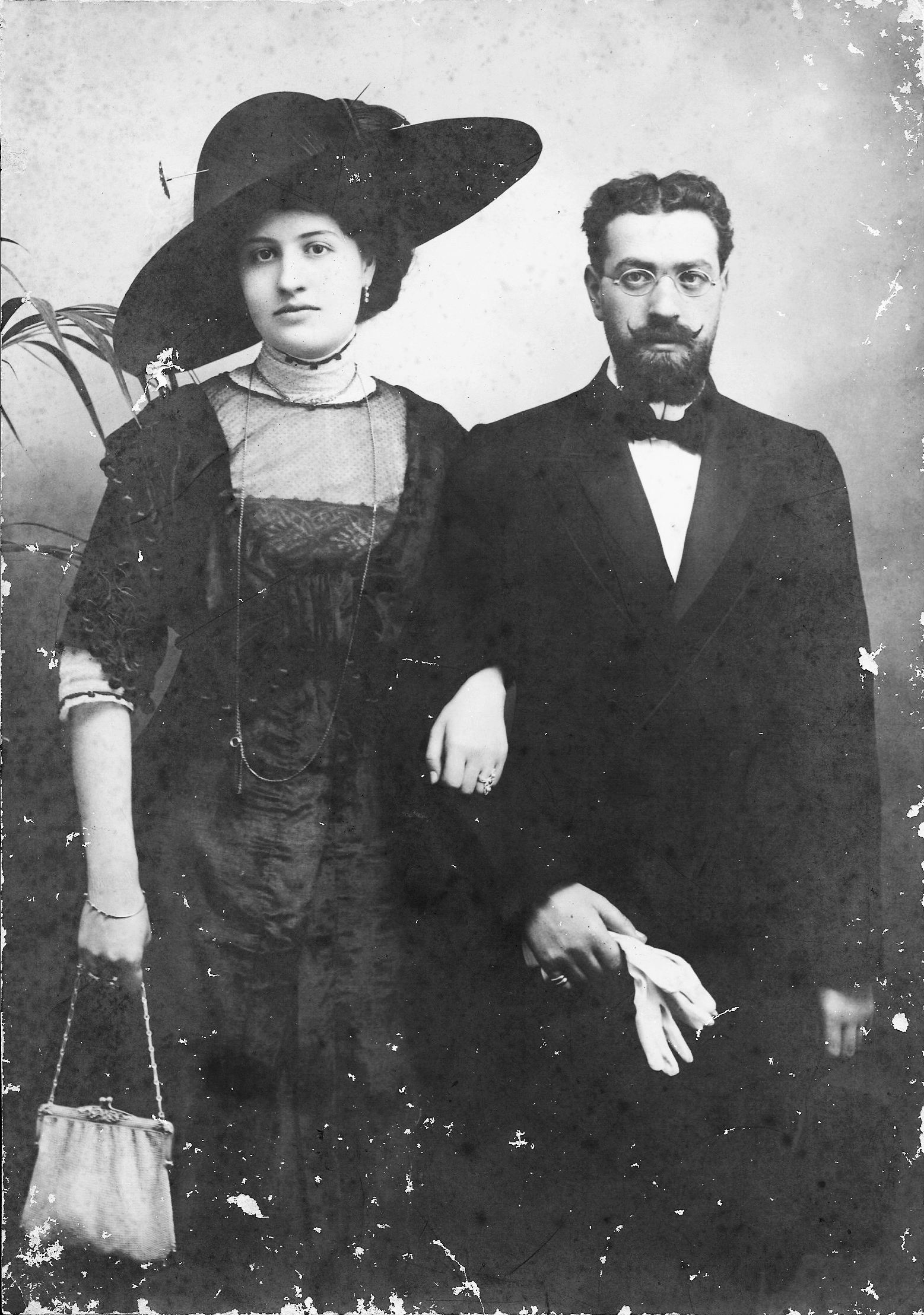
Adolfo Ottolenghi and his wife Regina Tedeschi Ottolenghi in Livorno, 1911

Ottolenghi was born to a prominent Jewish-Italian family from Piedmont on 30 July 1885 in Livorno, Italy. His parents were Abramo and Amalia Ventura.

== Rabbinical career ==
Ottolenghi earned the title of rabbi from the Rabbinic College of Livorno in 1907. He concurrently earned a law degree from the University of Pisa. Ottolenghi married Regina Tedeschi.

After moving to Venice in 1911, he became deputy rabbi. Ottolenghi also joined the Venetian Israelite Fraterna.

He was Venice's chief rabbi from 1919 to 1943.

== Holocaust ==
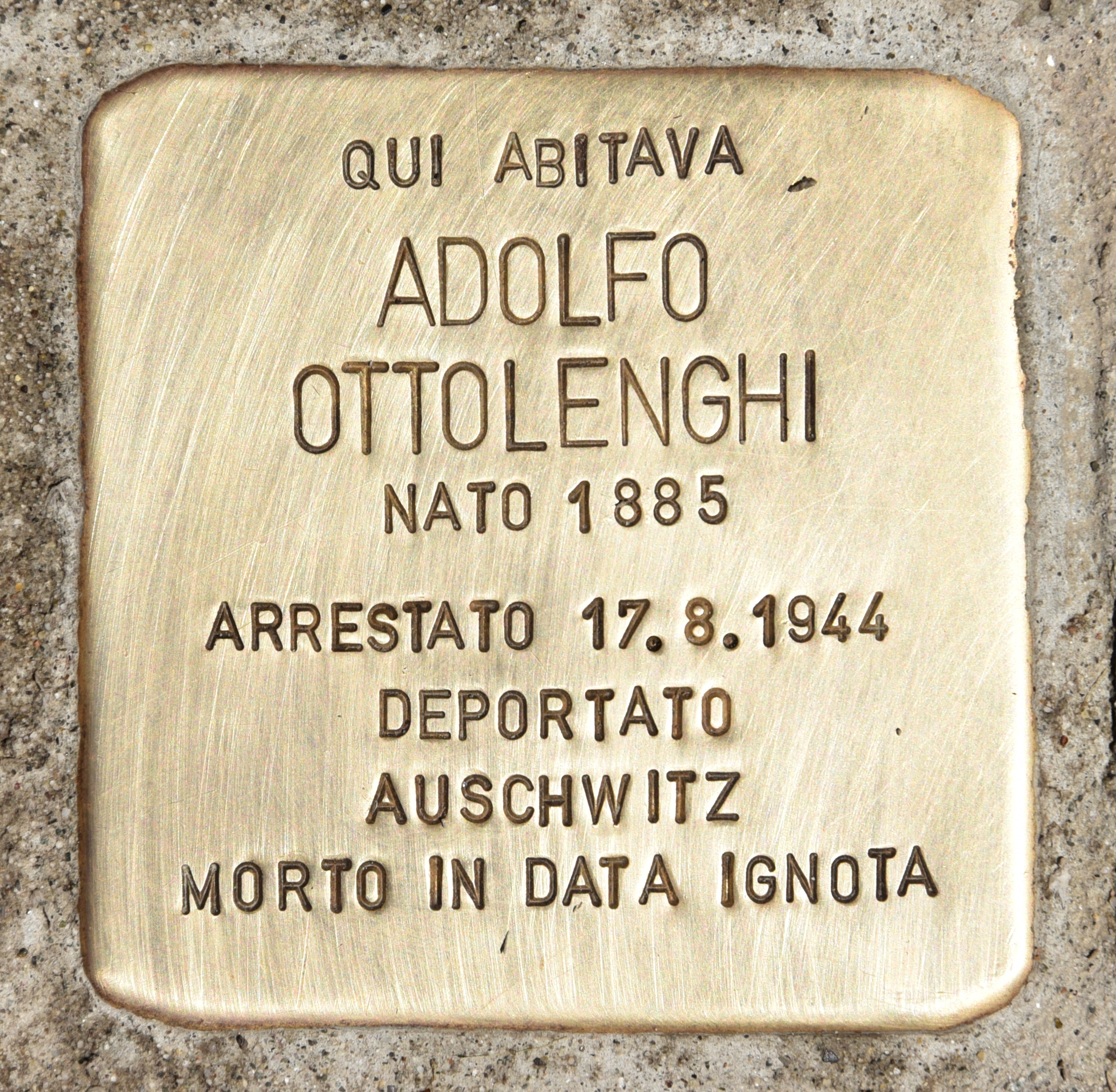
Stolperstein for Adolfo Ottolenghi, Rio Terà de la Madalena 2346/B, Venice

On 17 August 1944, during World War II, Ottolenghi was arrested by the Nazis with a group of 20 fellow elderly Jews in the Jewish nursing home. All were over 70 years of age. After being sent to Risiera di San Sabba in Trieste, he was deported to Germany. He died in Auschwitz on 2 September 1944.

=== Memorials ===
Today, there is a memorial plaque in Ottolenghi's honor in Ghetto Vecchio, Venice's Jewish neighborhood. The plaque was erected December 7, 1947.

Venice's 30-acre Ottolenghi Forest is named after him and features a memorial on Adolfo.

Ottolenghi has a stolperstein in Venice.

== Selected works ==
Ottolenghi wrote extensively on the history of the Jews of Venice, as well as Venetian Jews' participation in the Risorgimento. Elisabetta Ottolenghi, his granddaughter, said she became more observant in her Jewish faith after discovering works by her grandfather Adolfo.

- Leon da Modena e spunti di vita ebraica del ghetto nel sec. XVII (1929)
- Abraham Lattes nei suoi rapporti colla republica di Daniele Manin (1930)
- Per il IV centenario della Scuola Canton (1931)
