= Frank-Jürgen Richter =

German businessman (born 1967)

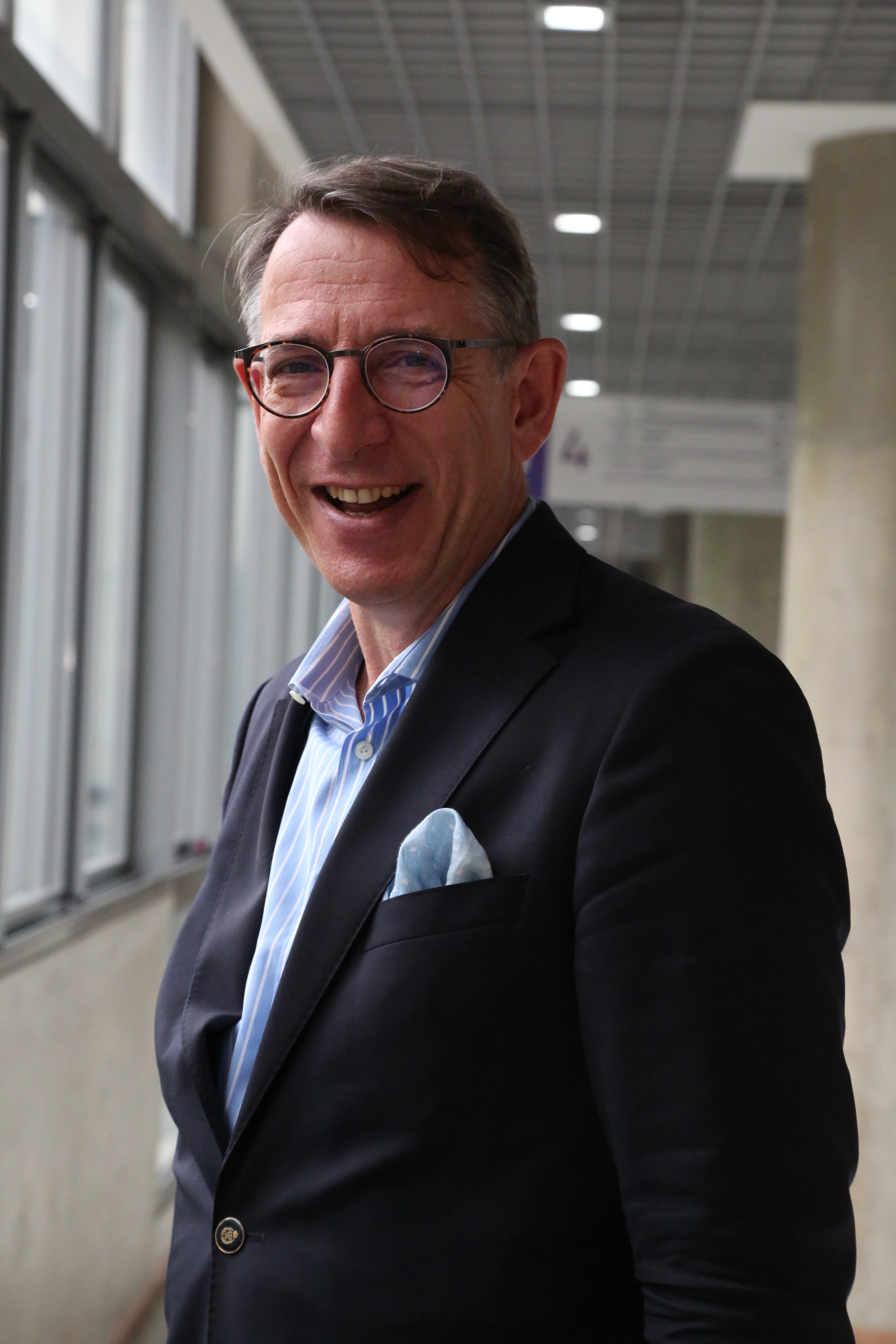
- Richter in 2025
- Born: 1967 (age 58–59); Karlsruhe, West Germany
- Education: Karlsruhe Institute of Technology; University of Tsukuba; University of Stuttgart
- Occupation: Chairman of Horasis
- Known for: Founder of Horasis and the Horasis Global Meeting and former director of the World Economic Forum

Frank-Jürgen Richter (born 1967) is a German businessman, economic advisor, and commentator. He is best known as the chairman of Horasis and founder of the Horasis Global Meeting, as well as a former director of the World Economic Forum.

== Early life ==
After graduating with a degree in industrial engineering from the University of Karlsruhe (now part of the Karlsruhe Institute of Technology) and academic stays in France and Mexico, Richter pursued his PhD-studies at the University of Tsukuba and obtained his doctoral degree from the University of Stuttgart.

From 1996 until 2000, he lived and worked in Asia where he developed and managed a European Multinationals' Asian operations, and then became a Director of the World Economic Forum from 2001 to 2004. Following the incorporation of Horasis in 2005 he has been a frequent international traveler, researcher and commentator as well as leading the annual Business Meetings.

== Career ==
In 2005, Richter founded Horasis, an independent think tank for global business topics. He works with businesspeople, politicians and intellectuals. He advises governments and private sector organizations on issues such as globalization, trade, and sustainable development.

Richter is a Member of the Advisory Board on impact leadership of University of Cambridge and Cheung Kong Graduate School of Business.

=== Publications ===
Richter is a frequent public speaker. He has authored and edited 37 books and numerous articles on global strategy and Asian business, covering topics such as the Asian business environment and how Asian firms bounced back from the 1998 Asian crisis. His writings have appeared in the financial and regional press such as The New York Times.

He has addressed audiences at the Brookings Institution, Harvard University, Beijing University, National Research University Higher School of Economics, Moscow, Royal Institute of International Affairs, and at several corporate events. He has been interviewed by several publications, and appeared on CNN, BBC, CNBC, CCTV (China Central Television) as well as The Voice of America (VOA).

== Awards ==
In 2016, Richter received the Harish Mahindra Memorial Global Award for Outstanding Contributions to the Global Economy from Priyadarshini Academy.

== Bibliography ==
- The Dynamics of Japanese Organizations, Routledge, 1996, ISBN 041513191-X
- The East Asian Development Model: Economic Growth, Institutional Failure and the Aftermath of the Crisis, Palgrave Macmillan, 2000, ISBN 0333920635
- Redesigning Asian Business: In the Aftermath of Crisis, Quorum Books, 2001, ISBN 9781567205251
- Recreating Asia: Visions for a New Century (with Pamela C. M. Mar), John Wiley & Sons, 2002, ISBN 0470820853
- India Rising: Emergence of a New World Power (with Colette Mathur), Marshall Cavendish Business, 2005, ISBN 9812611967
- Global Future: The Next Challenge for Asian Business (with ArnoudDeMeyer, Peter Williamson, Pamela C. M. Mar), John Wiley & Sons, 2005, ISBN 0470821302
- Six Billion Minds: Managing Outsourcing in the Global Knowledge Economy (with Mark Minevich), Aspatore Books, 2006, ISBN 1596224274
