= Neuburg am Rhein =

- Municipality
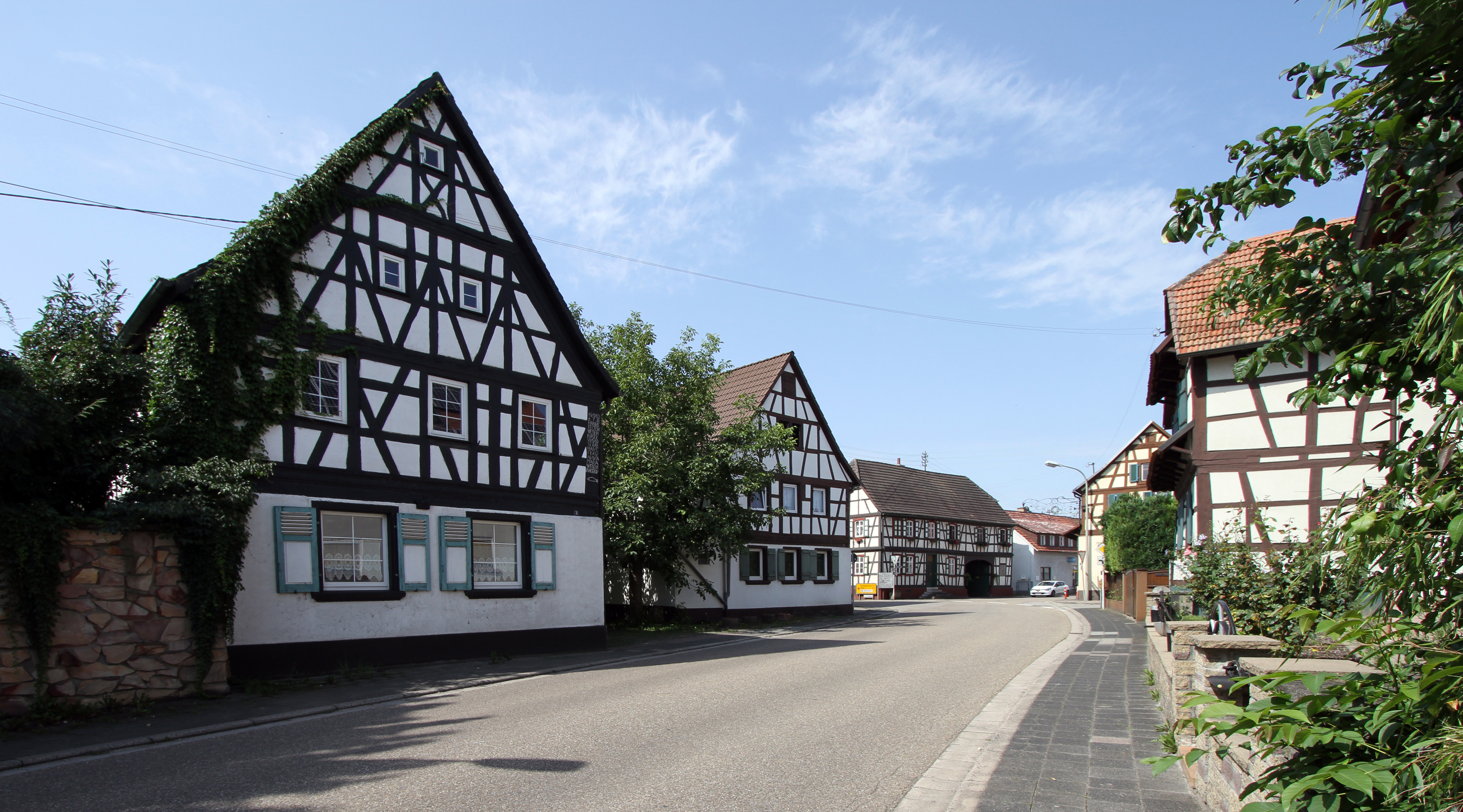

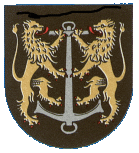
- Coat of arms

- Location of Neuburg am Rhein within Germersheim district
- Interactive map of Neuburg am Rhein
- Location within Germany Location within Rhineland-Palatinate
- Coordinates: 48°59′17″N 8°14′59″E
- Country: Germany
- State: Rhineland-Palatinate
- District: Germersheim
- Municipal assoc.: Hagenbach

Government
  - Mayor (2019–24): Hermann Knauß

Area
  - Total: 8.31 km^{2} (3.21 sq mi)
- Elevation: 106 m (348 ft)

Population (2025-12-31)
  - Total: 2,520
  - Density: 303/km^{2} (785/sq mi)
- Time zone: UTC+01:00 (CET)
  - Summer (DST): UTC+02:00 (CEST)
- Postal codes: 76776
- Dialling codes: 07273
- Vehicle registration: GER
- Website: www.neuburg-rhein.de

Neuburg am Rhein (German pronunciation: [ˈnɔʏbʊʁk ʔam ˈʁaɪn], lit. 'Neuburg on the Rhine') is a municipality in the district of Germersheim, in Rhineland-Palatinate, Germany. It is the southernmost municipality in the state.

== Personalities ==
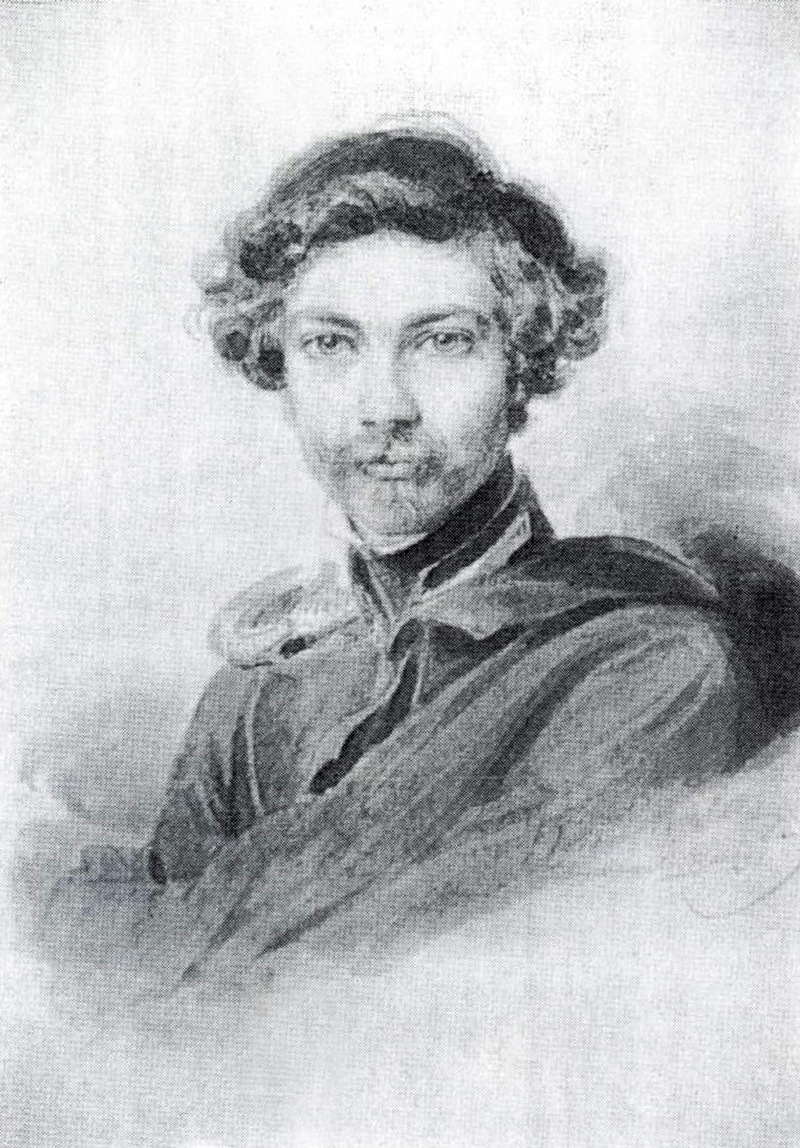
Ferdinand von Malaisé

- Ferdinand von Malaisé (1806-1892); Bavarian General and educator of King Ludwig III of Bavaria, grew up in Neuburg
