= Federbach (Alb) =

River in Germany

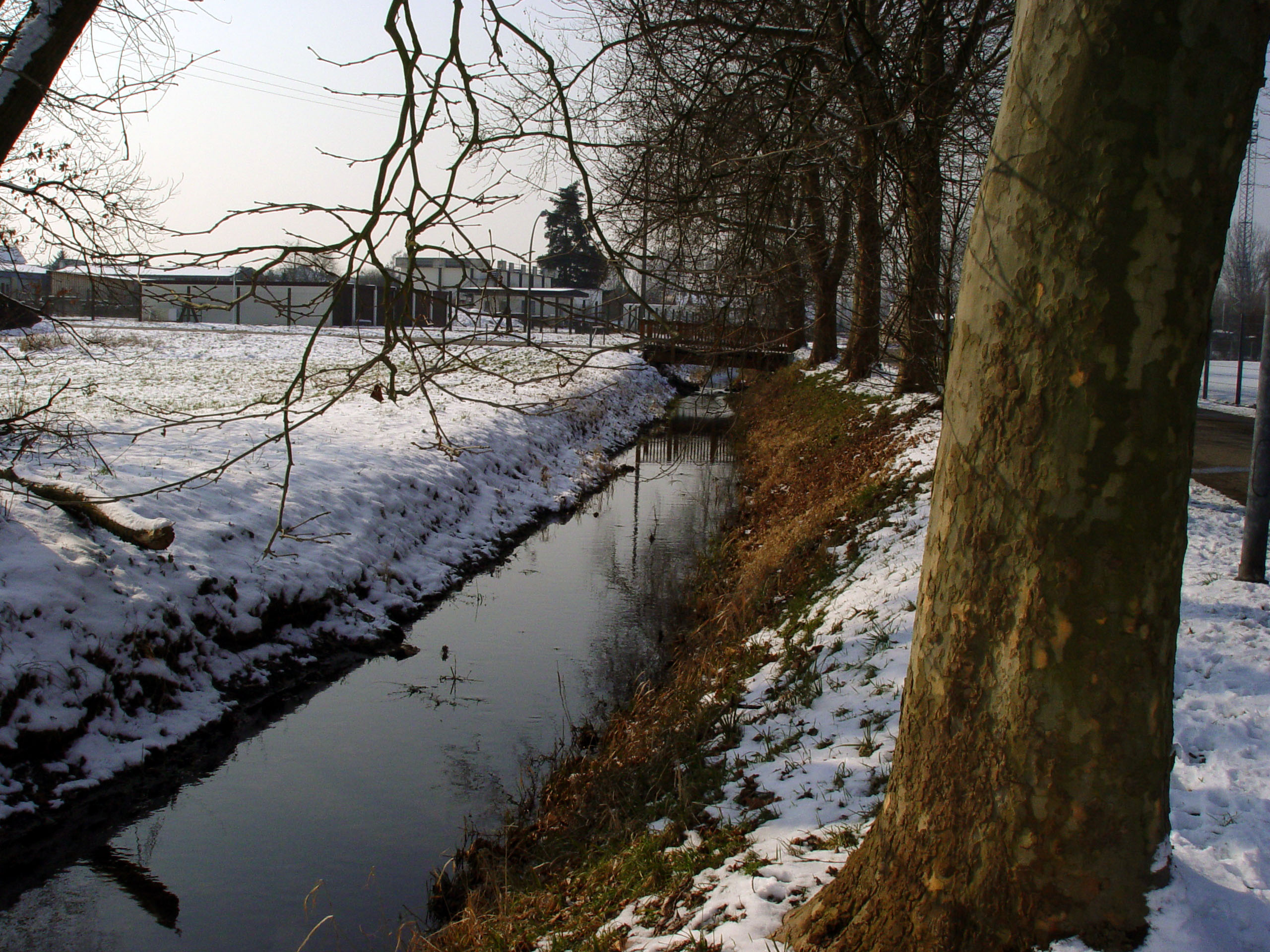
- The Federbach in Bietigheim

Location
- Country: Germany
- State: Baden-Württemberg
- Reference no.: DE: 23748

Physical characteristics
- Source
  - location: Where the Am Federbach road branches off Neudorfstraße in Malsch
  - coordinates: 48°53′00″N 8°19′57″E
  - elevation: ca. 125 m above sea level (NN)
- Mouth
  - location: Into the Alb in the southeast of Karlsruhe-Maxau by the B 10 bridge
  - coordinates: 49°02′14″N 8°19′01″E
  - elevation: ca. 105 m above sea level (NN)
- Length: 41.7 km (25.9 mi)
- Basin size: 127 km^{2} (49 sq mi)

Basin features
- Progression: Alb→ Rhine→ North Sea

The Federbach is a roughly 41-kilometre-long (25 mi) stream in the German state of Baden-Württemberg. It flows through the districts of Karlsruhe and Rastatt and discharges today near the Karlsruhe district of Maxau into the Alb.

Its source region lies in the municipality of Malsch on the edge of the Northern Black Forest. Unlike the other streams on the right-hand side of the Upper Rhine Plain the Federbach flows from Malsch initially southwest, then swings west near Muggensturm and accompanies the Rhine northwards for a long way after entering the Rhine lowlands.

As a result of the influence of man from the early 18th century to the 1930s the course of the Federbach was significantly changed. The 1993 water management and ecological pilot project, "Federbach lowland development concept" (Entwicklungskonzept Federbachniederung) aimed to develop the Federbach and its lowland areas into a near-natural region. The planned measures were implemented in 14 construction phases from 1995 to 2009.

== See also ==
- List of rivers of Baden-Württemberg
