= Trams in Karlsruhe =

Network of tramways in Karlsruhe, Germany

Coordinates: 49°00′33″N 08°24′14″E

Karlsruhe tramway network
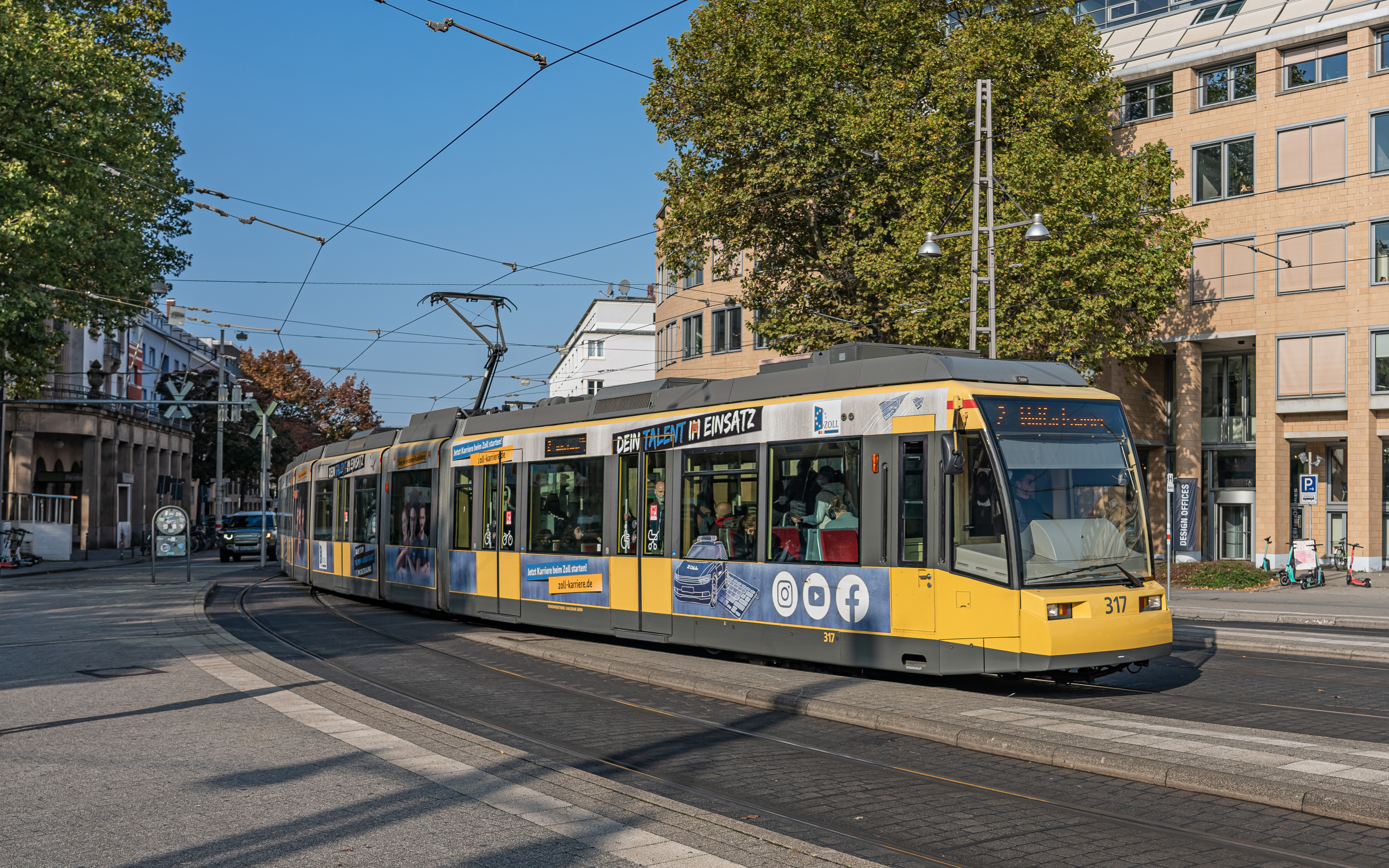
- GT8-70D/N tram at the railway station

Operation
- Locale: Karlsruhe, Baden-Württemberg, Germany

Statistics
Horse tram era: 1877–1900
- Status: Converted to electricity
- Track gauge: 1,435 mm (4 ft 8 1/2 in) standard gauge
- Propulsion system: Horses
Steam tram era: 1881–1900
- Status: Converted to electricity
- Track gauge: 1,435 mm (4 ft 8 1/2 in) standard gauge
- Propulsion system: Steam trams
Electric tram era: since 1900
- Status: Operational
- Lines: 7
- Operators: Verkehrsbetriebe Karlsruhe GmbH; (since 1997)
- Track gauge: 1,435 mm (4 ft 8 1/2 in) standard gauge
- Propulsion system: Electricity
- Electrification: 750 V DC; Some 15 kV AC 16.7 Hz
- Depot: 3
- Route length: 71.5 km (44.4 mi)
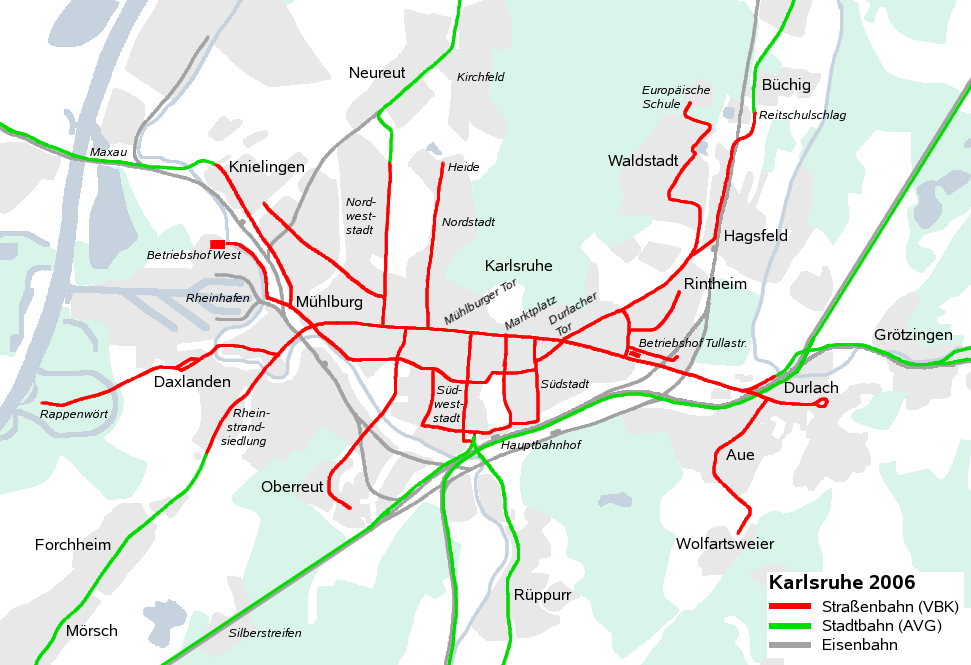
- Karlsruhe tramway network, 2006
- Website: http://www.vbk.info Verkehrsbetriebe Karlsruhe (in German)

The Karlsruhe tramway network (German: Straßenbahnnetz Karlsruhe) is a network of tramways forming part of the public transport system in Karlsruhe, a city in the federal state of Baden-Württemberg, Germany.

Opened in 1877, the network has been operated since 1997 by Verkehrsbetriebe Karlsruhe GmbH (VBK), a company owned by the city of Karlsruhe. The city itself was the tram network's operator between 1903 and 1997.

== History ==
=== Horse and steam ===
During the Industrial Revolution, in the 19th century, the city of Karlsruhe grew well beyond its then city limits. In 1850–1890 alone, the population quadrupled to nearly 100,000 inhabitants, making it necessary to create a better transportation system. A horse-drawn tramway was first proposed unsuccessfully in 1869. On 21 January 1877, the first horse-drawn tramway was opened from Gottesauer Platz to Mühlburger Tor in an east–west direction through the city of Karlsruhe. In the same year, this was followed by a branch line to the old railway station and an approximately 2 km (1.2 mi) extension from Mühlburger Tor west to Mühlburg. The track was built to standard gauge.

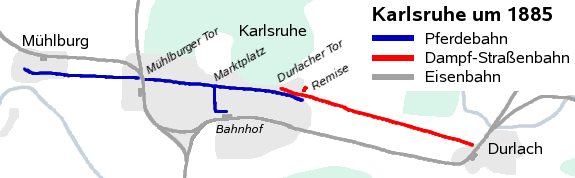
Horse and steam tram network in 1885

On 16 July 1881, an approximately 4 km (2.5 mi) line was opened to the east from Durlacher Tor in Karlsruhe to the town of Durlach. Because of the greater distance, this line was not horse-hauled, but operated as a steam tramway. After 1881, the extent of the tram system remained unchanged for 19 years.

The horse and steam trams had no great commercial success. Although passenger numbers grew steadily from 1.6 million passengers in 1882 to 2.5 million in 1893 and 3.6 million in 1899, the financial situation of the company was poor. So the ownership of the tramway changed several times in the early years of its existence, until a permanent solution was found with the founding of the Vereinigte Karlsruher, Mühlburger und Durlacher Pferde- und Dampfbahngesellschaft (United Karlsruhe, Mühlburg and Durlach Horse and Steam Railway Company). In 1893, the company owned five steam locomotives for the line to Durlach, 46 horses and 32 carriages, including 15 for steam operations.

=== Electrification and acquisition of the tramway ===
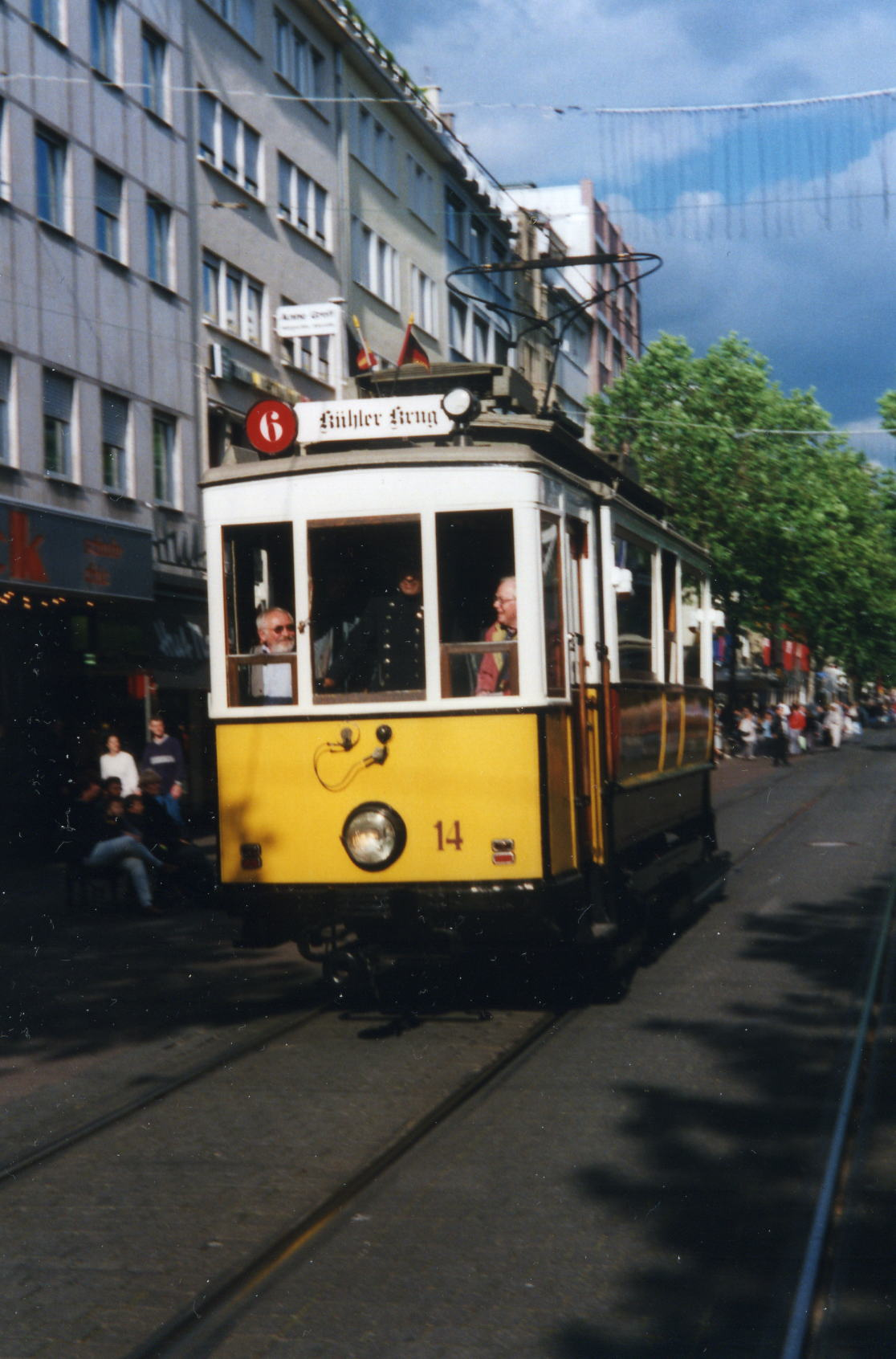
Museum tramcar 14 of the first series of electric trams in Karlsruhe. supplied in 1899

In 1894, AEG took over the Karlsruhe horse and steam tramways and founded the Karlsruher Straßenbahn-Gesellschaft (Karlsruhe Tram Company) with the intention of converting it into an electric tramway. This project was initially delayed by concerns that the electrical overhead lines would ruin the inner city and that the electric trams would disturb the instruments of the Technical University. The tram network was not electrified until 1900, but a compromise meant that overhead lines were not built through the centre of Karlsruhe and instead were operated with accumulator cars.

The first electric tram service was opened on the former steam tram route between Durlacher Tor and Durlach on 10 February 1900; the last horse tram service was operated on 19 March prior to the conversion. 46 two-axle electric cars were obtained for electrical operations, of which 19 could operate only on the outskirts to Mühlburg and Durlach, while the other 27 cars could operate in the city centre thanks to built-in rechargeable batteries. Three years later, the city centre route was equipped with an overhead line and the accumulator mode was abandoned, so that all cars could be used everywhere.

In the following years the tram network was extended to some of the newly created suburbs (Oststadt, Weststadt, Südweststadt) and was to the nearby towns of Beiertheim. However, railway tracks significantly impeded routes in the middle of the city, so not all proposed extensions could be implemented. The importance of the tramway for the urban development prompted the city of Karlsruhe to acquire the tram service from AEG in 1903 and operate it as a municipal undertaking. Compared to the period of horse and steam operations, the expansion of the network accelerated and passenger traffic rose rapidly. For example, in 1901 there were 6.8 million passengers and by 1912 patronage had reached 15.9 million passengers.

=== Development until the Second World War ===
The development of the Karlsruhe tram network at the beginning of the 20th century was affected by the numerous level crossings in the city area where trams were not allowed to cross over railways or could cross only with restrictions. Therefore, some of the desired extensions, for example, in the southern district, were possible only with the relocation of Karlsruhe station in 1913. Subsequently, the tram network was expanded to the south. However, some of these expansions were delayed by the First World War until 1921.

In 1915, the Karlsruhe Local Railway was acquired by the city of Karlsruhe and the metre gauge network became part of the urban tramway. However, the metre-gauge operation was uneconomical and most sections of it had been closed down by 1938. The metre-gauge operation finally ended on the last line to Hagsfeld in 1955.

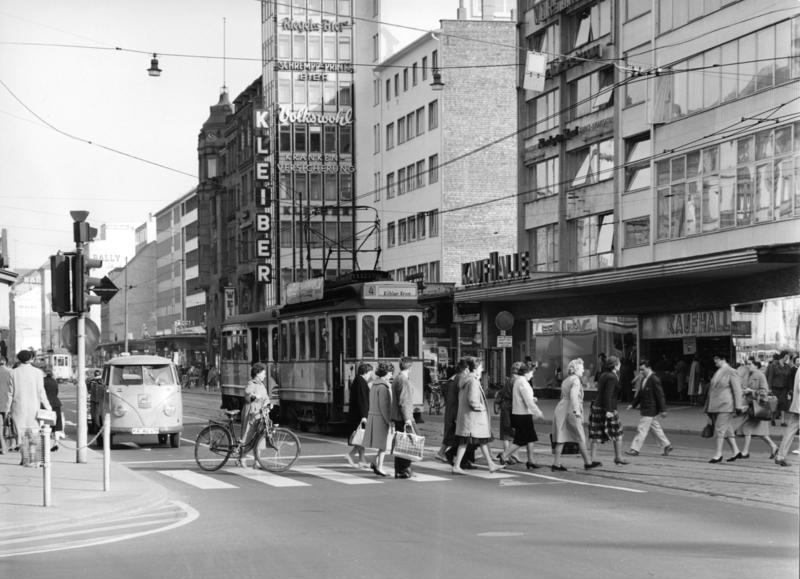
A two-axle tram in Kaiserstraße near Europaplatz in 1961. The trams were acquired at the end of the 1920s.

Passenger numbers grew steadily until World War I with a record 56.3 million in 1919, but they collapsed due to the economic conditions after the war and the hyperinflation in 1923/24 to only 21 million. By 1925, patronage recovered and reached a level of about 40 million passengers annually. The economic recovery after 1924 made possible the expansion of its network to neighbouring towns like Knielingen (1925), Daxlanden (1928) and Rintheim (1929). Also in 1929, the newly opened outdoor swimming pool of Rheinstrandbad on the island of Rappenwört was connected to Karlsruhe. This line operated until 1997, but, due to the lack of housing on the line, only during the summer bathing season. The Great Depression made further route expansion in those years impossible. Passenger numbers fell and the deficit rose. As a result, attempts were made to economise through the use of trailers instead of additional trams.

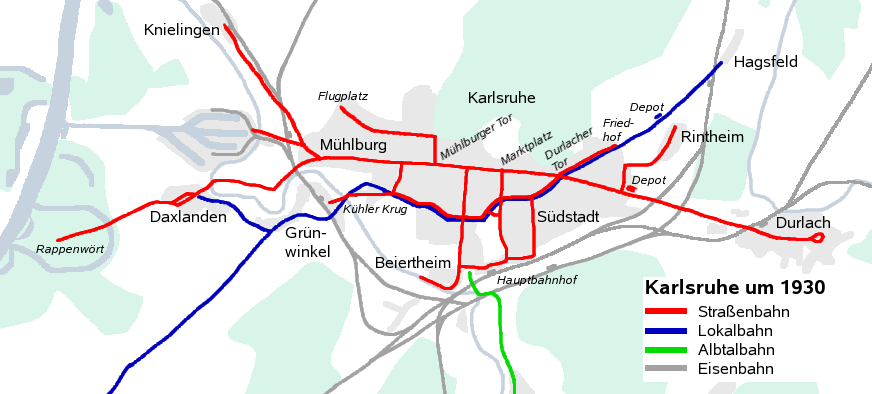
Tram network in 1930

The tramway was affected by the Second World War. At first, the main effects of the war were the lack of staff and materials, so that, as in the First World War, women were employed as conductors and drivers, while the workforce was male only during peacetime until the early 1990s. Blackout measures were taken as a protection against air raids: headlights and windows were partially covered and the trams were given a grey camouflage. Due to the fuel shortage, truck operations were restricted during the war years, so trams carried mail between Karlsruhe station and the main post office as well as fruit and vegetable shipments from the market hall to various retailers. As in the First World War, passenger numbers also rose considerably during the Second World War, reaching 66 million passengers in 1943. The tramways were damaged by a bombing raid in 1941 and the tram network was closed 1944 by massive raids and could only be partly restored to operation. Apart from the damage to the network, two tramcars and three trailers were destroyed.

After the occupation of Karlsruhe in April 1945, the tram service was gradually brought back into operation. By 1950, the reconstruction was complete, although some bridges had been given only temporary repairs. The carriage of fruit, vegetables and mail by tram ended with the normalisation of conditions.

=== Modernisation and expansion ===
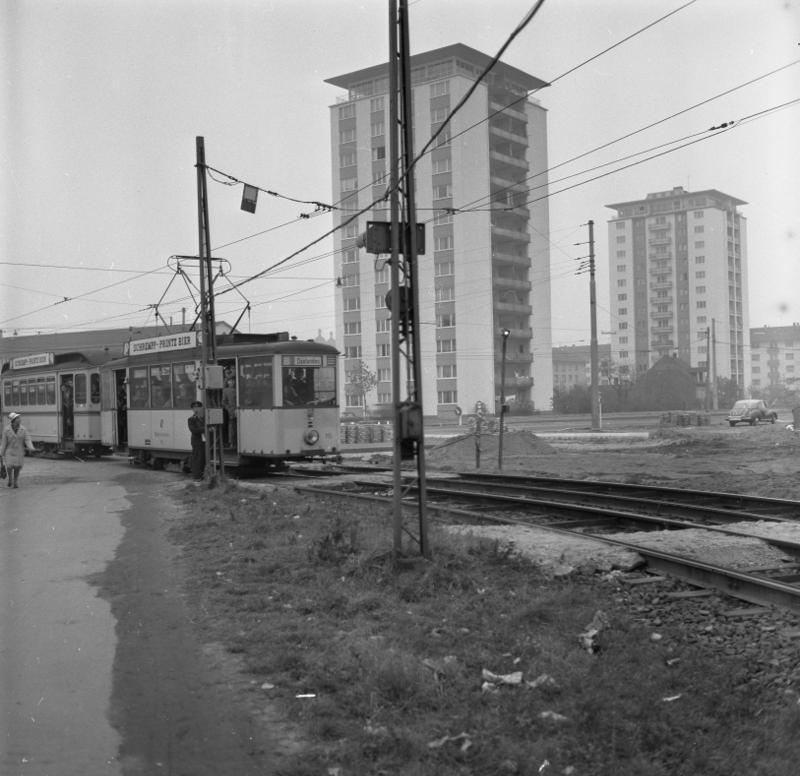
A Kriegsstraßenbahnwagen wartime tramcar with two-axle trailers in 1961

Soon after the Second World War a structural change occurred in an urban development that had a significant impact on public transport and so also for Karlsruhe. This involved the creation of new, large housing estates on the periphery that had to be connected to the city. From the 1960s, there has been increased suburbanisation, which has led to significant growth in the neighbouring municipalities, which continues to date. In parallel with this there has been a change in the economic structure: the large factories in the city were abandoned and new industrial and commercial areas were developed on the outskirts.

The emergence of mass motorisation led to increasing competition for the trams. In addition the increasing car traffic led to increased congestion on the tram routes. In contrast, the tramway network in the early 1950s was still the same as it was in 1930. The difficult economic situation of the 1930s and material deprivation and destruction during the Second World War did not permit modernisation of vehicles and equipment.

Unlike many other cities that closed their tramway networks, Karlsruhe started to modernise its network: by 1980, 75% of the tracks were separated from road traffic and upgraded to double track, except for four short sections. In several places wider parallel roads were built next to tram lines. A pedestrian zone was established in the inner city next to the tram lines from 1974. The only route converted to bus operations was a short line to Beiertheim closed in 1956. New lines were built from 1953 to close gaps in the network and to connect new neighbourhoods to the tram network. Thus, connections were built to Waldstadt in 1960, to Nordweststadt in 1975, to Rheinstrandsiedlung in 1980 and to Oberreut in 1986.

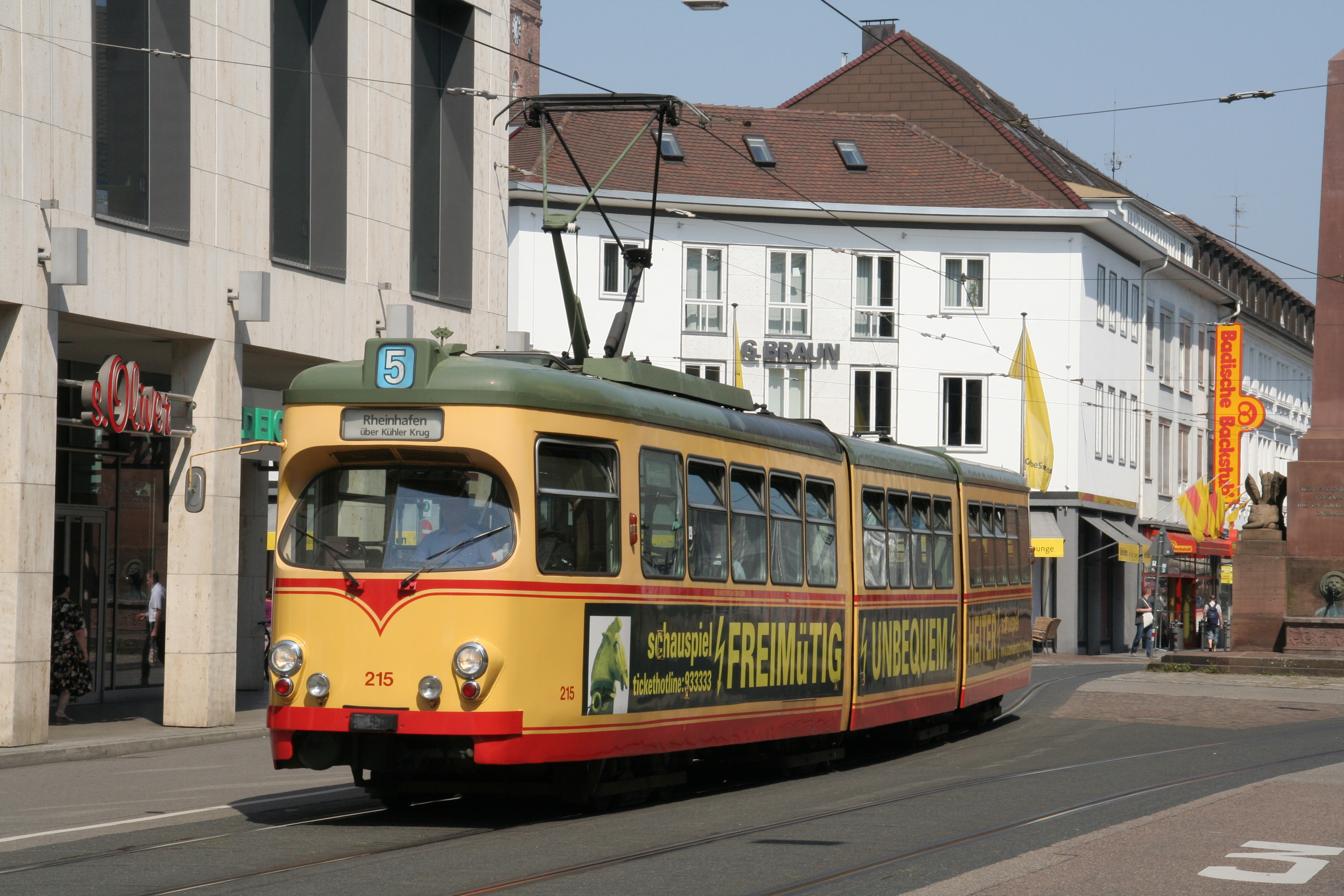
Articulated tramcar 215 in Karl-Friedrich-Straße near Rondellplatz

The rolling stock was renewed with the procurement of 23 four-axle tram cars from 1954 and 75 six-and eight-axle articulated trams between 1959 and 1978, so that the pre-war two-axle trams were withdrawn from the operating fleet by the early 1970s. New vehicles introduced from 1969 allowed conductor-less operation and thus made further rationalisation of operations possible.

The acquisition of the Alb Valley Railway and the Busenbach-Ittersbach railway along with the Albtal-Verkehrs-Gesellschaft (Alb Valley Transport Company, AVG) in 1957 and their regauging and connection to the tramway network allowed AVG vehicles to operate on the tracks of Verkehrsbetriebe Karlsruhe, giving direct services between the surrounding countryside and central Karlsruhe. Further enhancements in the region came after 1979 with the integration of the Hardt Railway in the AVG and the development of the Karlsruhe model of tram-train operations. In 1994, a common fare system was introduced with the establishment of the Karlsruher Verkehrsverbund (Karlsruhe Transport Association, KVV). In 1997, Verkehrsbetriebe Karlsruhe was converted into a public company, previously it had been a public utility owned by the city.

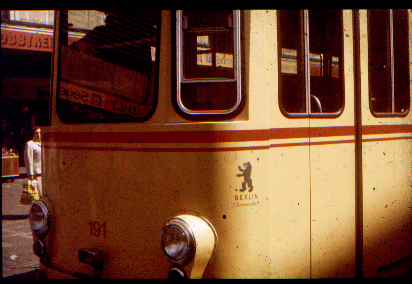
Formerly typical in Karlsruhe: Berlin coat of arms and district name indicating the origin of the vehicle (DWM or Waggon Union of Berlin)

Despite the extensive modernisation, passenger numbers stagnated between 1950 and 1985 at around 40 million annually. Passenger numbers only rose with the expansion of the network from the 1980s, the introduction of regular interval operations on a clock-face schedule and attractive fares and a greater environmental awareness among the people. In 1996, the VBK's trams carried 66 million passengers and the city's bus carried another ten million. Now, buses and trams carry 100 million passengers annually.

=== The present situation ===
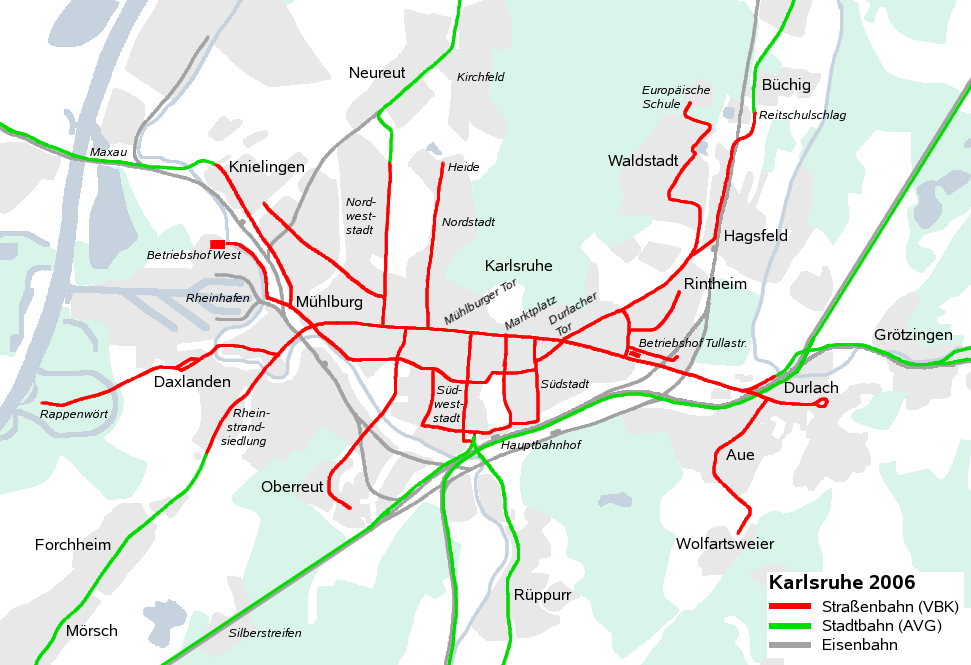
Map of current tram network

Since the mid-1990s, the vehicle fleet has been renewed with the procurement of low-floor trams, so that the articulated trams of the 1960s and 1970s have been largely taken out of operations. The older vehicles were last used on tram line 5 in 2015. The latest enhancements to the tram network are the tramlines on Brauerstraße (2000), to the European School (2000), to Wolfartsweier (2004) and to Nordstadt (2006). In 2008, another depot was put into operation in Karlsruhe Oststadt.

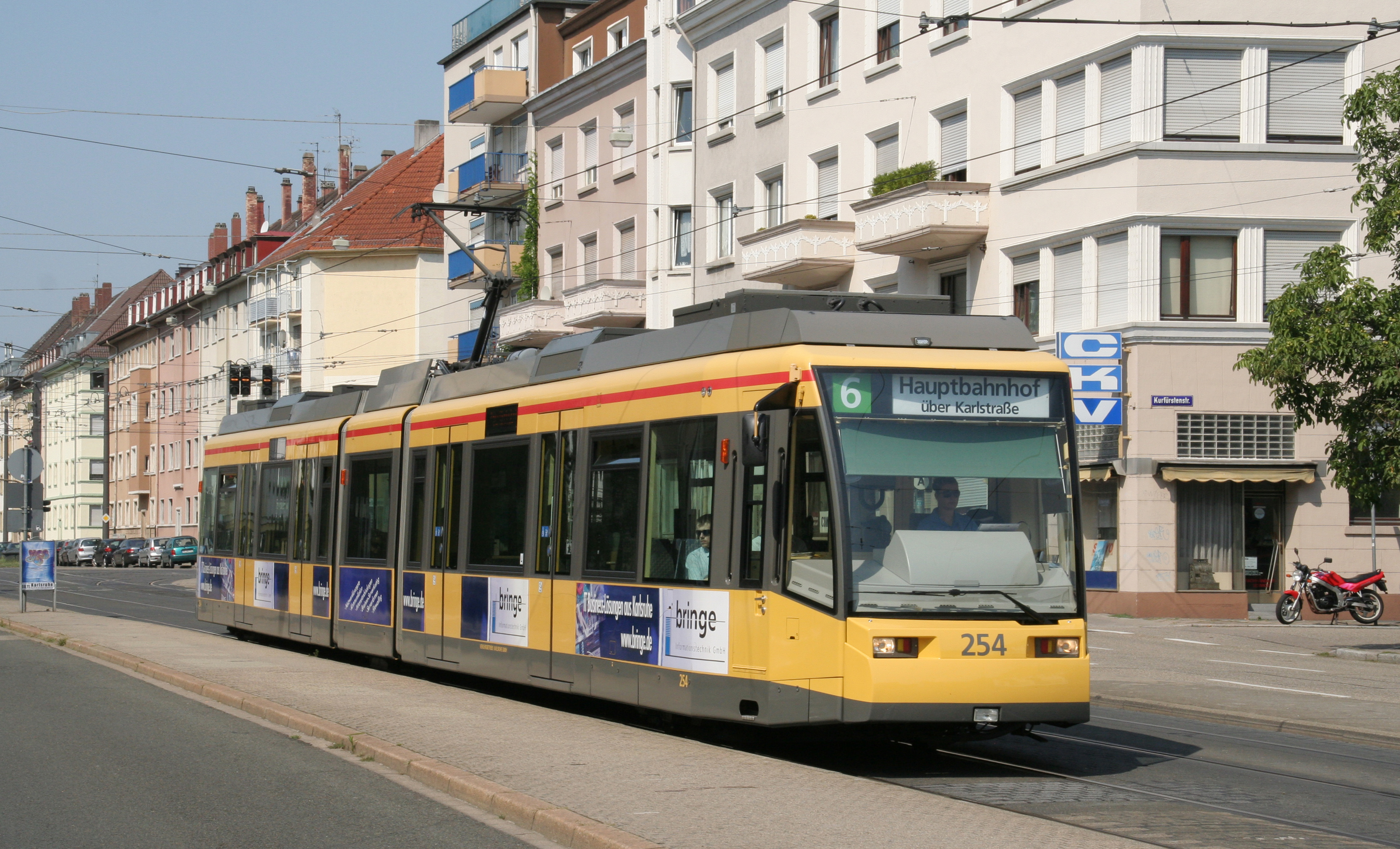
Low floor tramcar of class DUEWAG GT6-70D/N in Ebertstraße

On 3 March 2011, construction started on a line from Tullastraße via Schlachthofstraße and Ludwig-Erhard-Allee to Baumeisterstraße. The 2.2 km long route with four new stops was opened after 18 months of construction on 8 September 2012 at a cost about €30 million. It is served by an extension of tram line 6 from Karlsruhe Hauptbahnhof at ten-minute intervals.

=== Stadtbahn tunnel ===
Since the 1960s, there have been attempts to build a tramway tunnel in the centre of Karlsruhe to relieve the main shopping street of trams. However, these plans always failed because of the cost of such a project. As the volume of trams on the central corridor along Kaiserstraße continued to grow with the expansion of the tramway and the Karlsruhe Stadtbahn network in the 1980s and 1990s, further plans for a tunnel route were made to relieve the surface tram line. After an initial rejection at a referendum in 1996, a modified plan was confirmed at a further referendum in 2002. At the end of 2005 the so-called "combined solution" (Kombilösung) for the Stadtbahn tunnel completed the planning approval process. In December 2008, the Karlsruhe regional council approved the details of the work. The Stadtbahn tunnel has been under construction since 2010.

The project consists of several parts:

- The construction of a two-track rail tunnel in the east–west direction in Kaiserstraße between Durlacher Tor and Mühlburger Tor with a branch from Marktplatz to the south to the convention centre (Kongresszentrum Karlsruhe; about 3.5 km (2.2 mi) of tunnel with seven stops);
- The construction of a two-track tram line in Kriegsstraße between Karlstor and Mendelssohnplatz, about 400 metres (1,300 ft) south of Kaiserstraße (length: 1.2 km (0.75 mi))
- The construction of a road tunnel under Kriegsstraße;
- The dismantling of the surface tram tracks in Kaiserstraße between Europaplatz and Kronenplatz and in Karl-Friedrich-Straße/Ettlinger Straße between Marktplatz and Vierortbad.

It was estimated that the cost of the project to the city of Karlsruhe would be €496 million and that its "standardised" ratio of discounted benefits to cost (Standardisierte Bewertung) would be 1.186. In June 2007, the Federal Republic of Germany, the state of Baden-Württemberg and the city Karlsruhe agreed on the allocation of costs. In December 2008, the cost estimate was adjusted to €588 million to be funded by a federal grant of €311 million (60% of eligible costs), state funds of €103.6 million (20%) plus the city's share of €173 million (20% plus costs that are ineligible for federal and state funding). Following the outcome of the tender, the final cost is estimated at approximately €630 million.

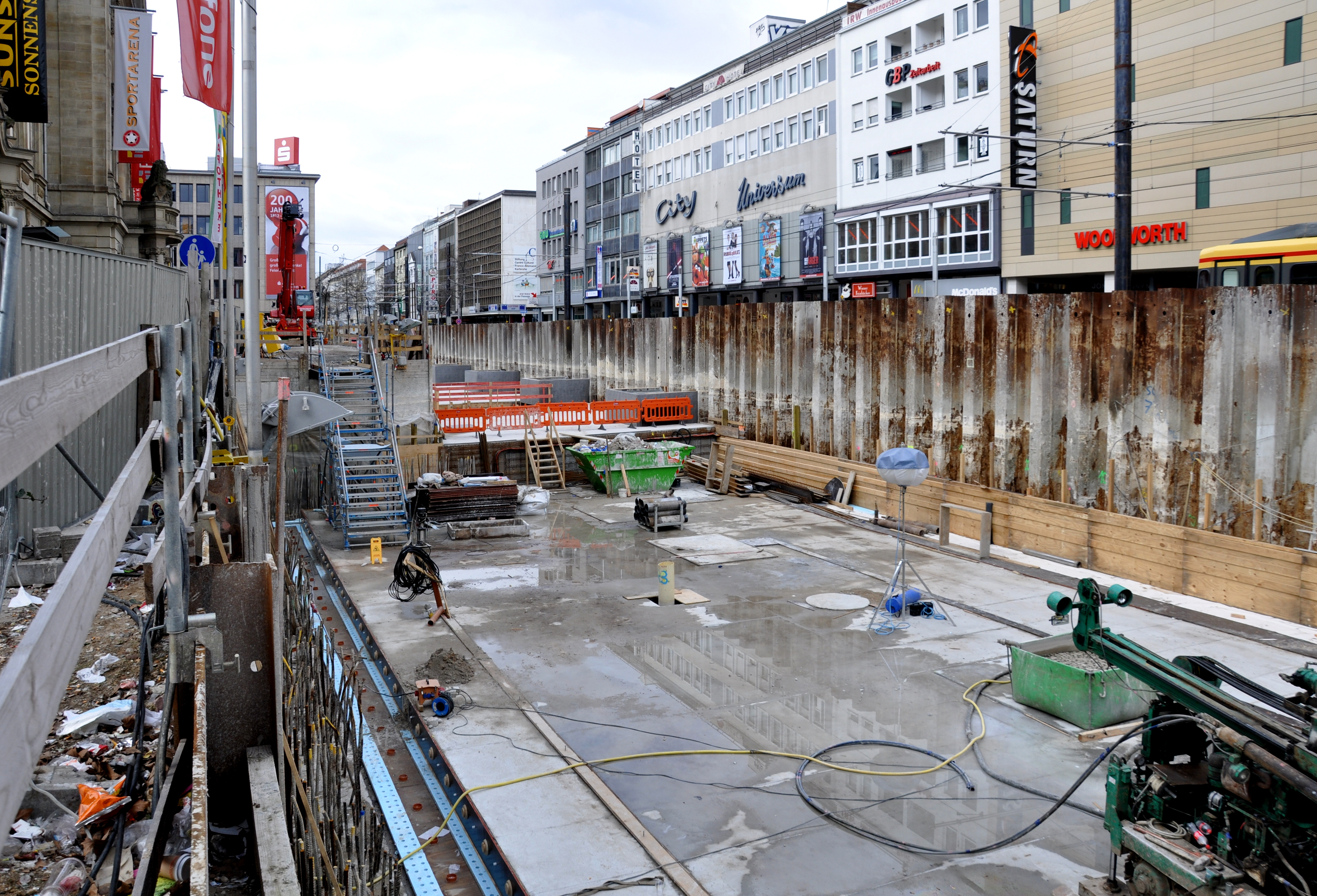
Construction of underground station in Europaplatz in February 2012

Financing and implementation is being handled by a company established for the purpose: Karlsruher Schieneninfrastruktur-Gesellschaft mbH. The project will relieve the inner city of tram and car traffic. The urban environment will benefit as a result of the elimination of the tram tracks in the pedestrian zone and the rebuilding of Kriegsstraße. The city will also benefit from the creation of additional capacity in the tram network.

The project is still very controversial, which was also reflected in the results of the two previous referendums. The high cost and the disruption during construction are criticised in particular. The necessity of the project continues to be questioned and alternative concepts have been proposed in the form of amended alignments. A citizens' initiative against the combined solution was launched in the summer of 2009 to require a third referendum, but this failed in the administrative court.

The first sod was turned for the construction of Stadtbahn tunnel on 21 January 2010. The first, preparatory work had already been carried out in 2009. Five years later than originally planned the Stadtbahn tunnel was finally completed in 2021. The reconstruction of the Kriegsstraße started in 2015 and is expected to be completed in 2022.

== Lines ==
As of 2012, the tram network in Karlsruhe operates on 71.5 kilometers (44.4 mi) of route; the total line length of the system is 127.1 kilometers (79.0 mi). The network comprises eight tramlines: five lines that operate daily, and three tramlines (Line 8, 17 and 18) that operate only on school days; a ninth tram route is operated by VBK as a subcontract of AVG and is operated as part of the Karlsruhe Stadtbahn.

Line	Route	Remarks
1	Durlach Turmberg – Auer Straße – Weinweg – Tullastraße – Durlacher Tor – Marktplatz – Europaplatz – Mühlburger Tor – Heide	
2	Wolfartsweier – Aue – Auer Straße – Tullastraße – Durlacher Tor – Marktplatz – Ettlinger Tor – Hauptbahnhof – ZKM – Karlstor – Europaplatz – Yorckstraße – Städtisches Klinikum – Siemensallee – Sudetenstraße – Pionierstraße – Egon Eirmann Allee – Knielingen Nord	
3	Tivoli – Hauptbahnhof – Kolpingplatz – Karlstor - Europaplatz – Entenfang – Daxlanden – Rappenwört	Not all trams run to Rappenwört, service patterns to Rappenwört change depending on season
4	Europaviertel – Waldstadt – Hirtenweg/Technologiepark – Hauptfriedhof – Durlacher Tor – Rüppurer Tor – Ettlinger Tor – Karlstor – Europaplatz – Mühlburger Tor – Schillerstraße – Weinbrennerplatz – Europhalle – Oberreut Badeniaplatz	
5	Rheinhafen – Entenfang – Kühler Krug – Weinbrennerplatz – Mathystraße – Karlstor – Ettlinger Tor – Rüppurrer Tor – Schloss Gottesaue – Tullastraße – Weinweg – Durlach Bahnhof	
8	Wolfartsweier – Aue – Durlach	Only on School days, 3 trips per day
17	Rheinhafen – Entenfang – Kühler Krug – Weinbrennerplatz – Mathystraße – Kolpingplatz – Hauptbahnhof – Tivoli – Philipp-Reis-Str. – Schloss Gottesaue – Tullastraße – Hauptfriedhof – Hirtenweg/Technologiepark – Waldstadt – Europaviertel	Only on School days, one trip per direction
18	Europaviertel – Waldstadt – Hirtenweg/Technologiepark – Hauptfriedhof – Tullastraße – Weinweg – Auer Straße – Durlach Turmberg	Only on School days, one trip per direction
S 2	Rheinstetten – Messe – Rheinstrandsiedlung – Entenfang – Europaplatz – Marktplatz – Durlacher Tor – Hauptfriedhof – Hirtenweg/Technologiepark – Hagsfeld – Stutensee Blankenloch – Stutensee Friedrichstal – Spöck	AVG Light Rail line, operation subcontracted to VBK

All daily tramlines run during the day on weekdays at ten-minute intervals. Line 8, 17 and 18 only operate once or twice on weekdays as a school tram, thus only on school days. Stadtbahn Line S 2 runs in the city area (Rheinstrandsiedlung <-> Reitschulschlag) during the day at ten-minute intervals. Services operate outside the city limits during the day at least at 20-minute intervals.

Additional Stadtbahn services are operated on the Karlsruhe tram network on the Karlsruhe model by Albtal-Verkehrs-Gesellschaft (AVG), using the infrastructure of Verkehrsbetriebe Karlsruhe (VBK) in Karlsruhe's city centre, and own infrastructure or national railway infrastructure outside of Karlsruhe. In Heilbronn city centre, infrastructure of Stadtwerke Heilbronn is used.

== See also ==
- Alb Valley Railway
- Karlsruhe Stadtbahn
- List of town tramway systems in Germany
- Trams in Germany
