= Karlsruher Verkehrsverbund =

Transport association in Baden-Württemberg, Rhineland-Palatinate and Alsace

Karlsruher Verkehrsverbund (KVV)
- Company type: GmbH
- Industry: Public transport
- Founded: 29 May 1994
- Headquarters: Karlsruhe, Germany
- Area served: Middle Baden, Southern Palatinate, parts of Alsace, Pforzheim, Enzkreis
- Key people: Alexander Pischon (CEO); Frank Mentrup (Chairman of Supervisory Board)
- Number of employees: 74 (2020)
- Website: www.kvv.de

The Karlsruher Verkehrsverbund (KVV) is a German transport association covering Middle Baden, the Southern Palatinate, parts of Alsace in France, and since 2026, the city of Pforzheim and the Enzkreis. Operating across Baden-Württemberg, Rhineland-Palatinate and France, it was established on 29 May 1994 as a cross-border public transport association.

== Responsibilities ==
The KVV is responsible for transport planning, coordination of services, tariff development, marketing, distribution of revenues, and representing the interests of its member municipalities. The shareholders are local authorities (counties and cities), which are also responsible bodies according to German public transport law. Agreements with transport companies are concluded in cooperation with these authorities.

== Key figures ==
As of 2024 (prior to the 2026 expansion), 31 transport companies operate under the KVV, providing a network of 275 lines.

- Service area: 3,550 km^{2}
- Population: ~1.33 million
- Stops served: ~1,900
- Rail network length: 1,000.6 km (397.5 km railway, 99.5 km tram, 503.6 km light rail)
- Bus network length: ~2,500 km
- Annual vehicle-km (2024): 51.3 million
- Passengers: 138.7 million (2024)

In the first full year of operations (1995), 102 million passengers used the KVV. Ridership peaked at 178 million in 2012, then declined and was severely impacted by the COVID-19 pandemic, which reduced passengers to 93.6 million in 2021. Recovery has been underway since 2022.

== Organisation ==
The KVV Supervisory Board has 28 members, chaired by the mayor of Karlsruhe. Shareholders are exclusively municipalities and counties, making KVV a municipal association.

=== Shareholders ===
As of 1 January 2026, with the integration of the former VPE, the city of Pforzheim and the Enzkreis district joined the KVV as new shareholders. Prior to this expansion, the shareholders and capital shares were:

- City of Karlsruhe – 52%
- District of Karlsruhe – 20%
- District of Germersheim – 8%
- District of Rastatt – 8%
- City of Baden-Baden – 8%
- District of Südliche Weinstraße – 2%
- City of Landau – 2%

=== Expansions ===
On 1 January 2026, the Verkehrsverbund Pforzheim-Enzkreis (VPE), covering the city of Pforzheim and the Enzkreis district, was officially integrated into the KVV. During a transition phase expected to last until December 2026, the former VPE tariff continues to apply in that area before a unified KVV fare system is rolled out for the new, enlarged overall network.

== Structure and fare area ==
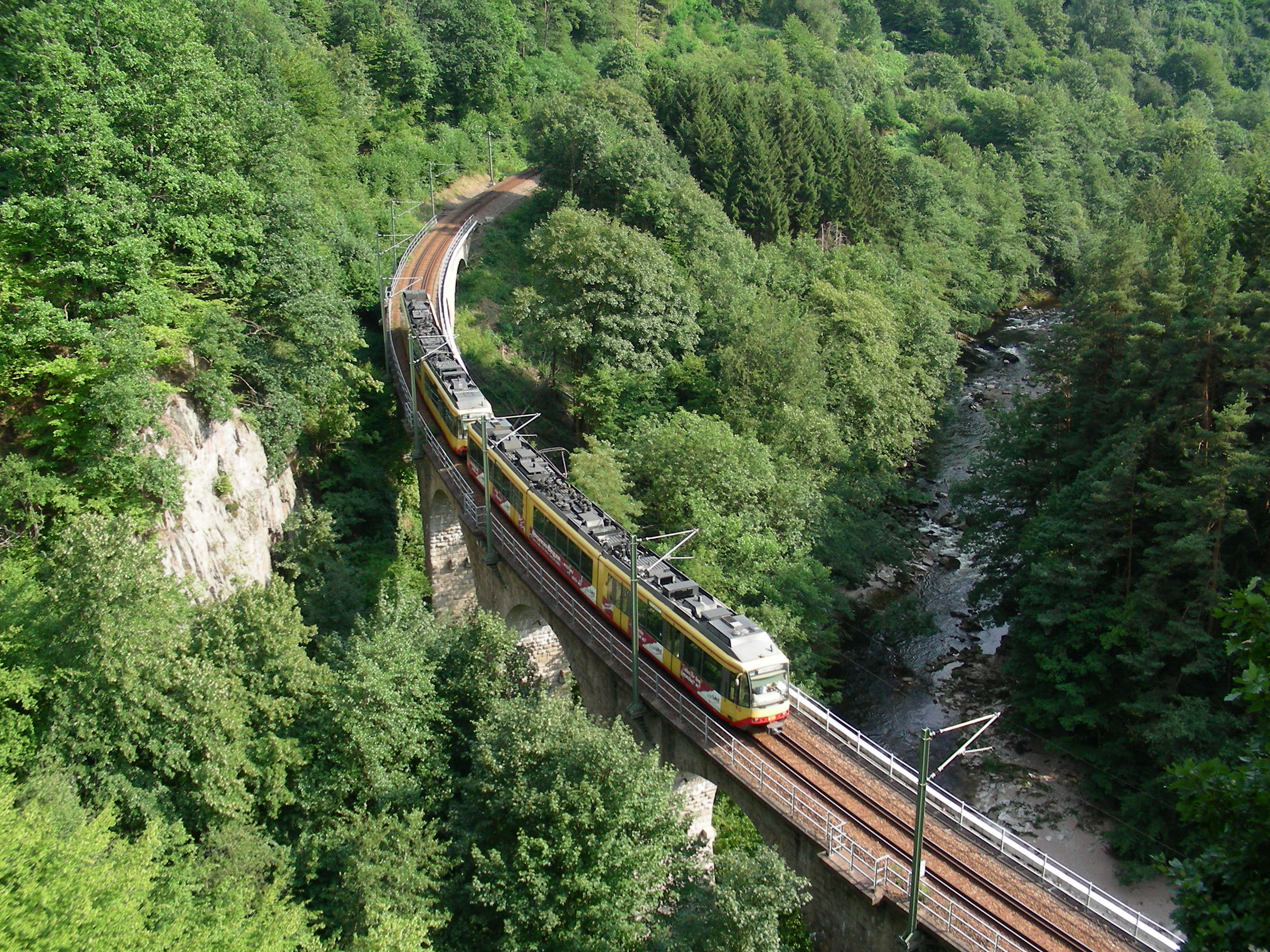
Dual-system light rail of the Karlsruhe Stadtbahn on Murgtal line

The fare area of the KVV extends beyond its shareholders’ territories into neighbouring regions. Predecessors of the KVV included tariff agreements between Verkehrsbetriebe Karlsruhe (VBK) and Albtal-Verkehrs-Gesellschaft (AVG).

The KVV is best known for the Karlsruhe model, a pioneering tram-train concept combining tram and railway operations.

The association also participates in the Konus scheme, allowing overnight visitors in the Black Forest region to use local public transport free of charge.

== Partner transport companies ==
More than 20 companies operate services in the KVV, including:

- Albtal-Verkehrs-Gesellschaft (light rail, regional rail)
- Verkehrsbetriebe Karlsruhe (tram and bus)
- DB Regio (regional rail)
- SüdwestBus (regional bus routes)
- Richard Eberhardt GmbH
- PalatinaBus

== Neighbouring associations ==
- Heilbronner Hohenloher Haller Nahverkehr (HNV)
- Tarifverbund Ortenau (TGO)
- Verkehrsgesellschaft Bäderkreis Calw (VGC)
- Verkehrs-Gemeinschaft Landkreis Freudenstadt (VGF)
- Verkehrsverbund Rhein-Neckar (VRN)

Following a memorandum of understanding in February 2025 and subsequent council approvals, the former neighbouring association Verkehrsverbund Pforzheim-Enzkreis (VPE) was officially absorbed by the KVV on 1 January 2026.

== Ticketing ==
The KVV offers a variety of tickets, including monthly and annual passes, student and senior discounts, and company tickets. A semester ticket is available for university students in Karlsruhe, Baden-Baden and Landau.

Digital ticketing was introduced in 2013 with the DB Touch&Travel system, later replaced by ticket2go. Since 2021, the KVV has integrated the nationwide FAIRTIQ app with a Luftlinie (as-the-crow-flies) tariff marketed as kvv.luftlinie. Pricing consists of a basic fee plus a per-kilometre charge based on straight-line distance.

Special offers include the Neubürgerkarte (new resident card), the 9-Uhr-Karte for off-peak travel, and regional day tickets such as the RegioX valid across KVV and neighbouring associations.

== Other services ==
KVV operates on-demand shuttle services ("KVV.MyShuttle" and "bwshuttle") in selected towns such as Remchingen, Dettenheim, Graben-Neudorf and Ettlingen. The association also runs the app KVV.regiomove for intermodal trip planning and booking.

== See also ==
- Trams in Karlsruhe
- Karlsruhe Stadtbahn
- Karlsruhe model
