= VBK =

VBK may refer to:

- Butch van Breda Kolff, an American basketball player and coach
- Jan van Breda Kolff, an American basketball player and coach, son of Butch van Breda Kolff
- John Vanbiesbrouck, an American hockey goaltender
- VBK-Raduga, a reentry capsule that was used for returning materials from the Mir space station
- Veen Bosch & Keuning, Dutch publishing house
- Verkehrsbetriebe Karlsruhe, the municipal transport company of the city of Karlsruhe in Germany
- Vetlanda BK, Swedish professional bandy club founded in 1945.
