= Karlsruhe Stadtbahn =

Tram-train system in Karlsruhe, Germany

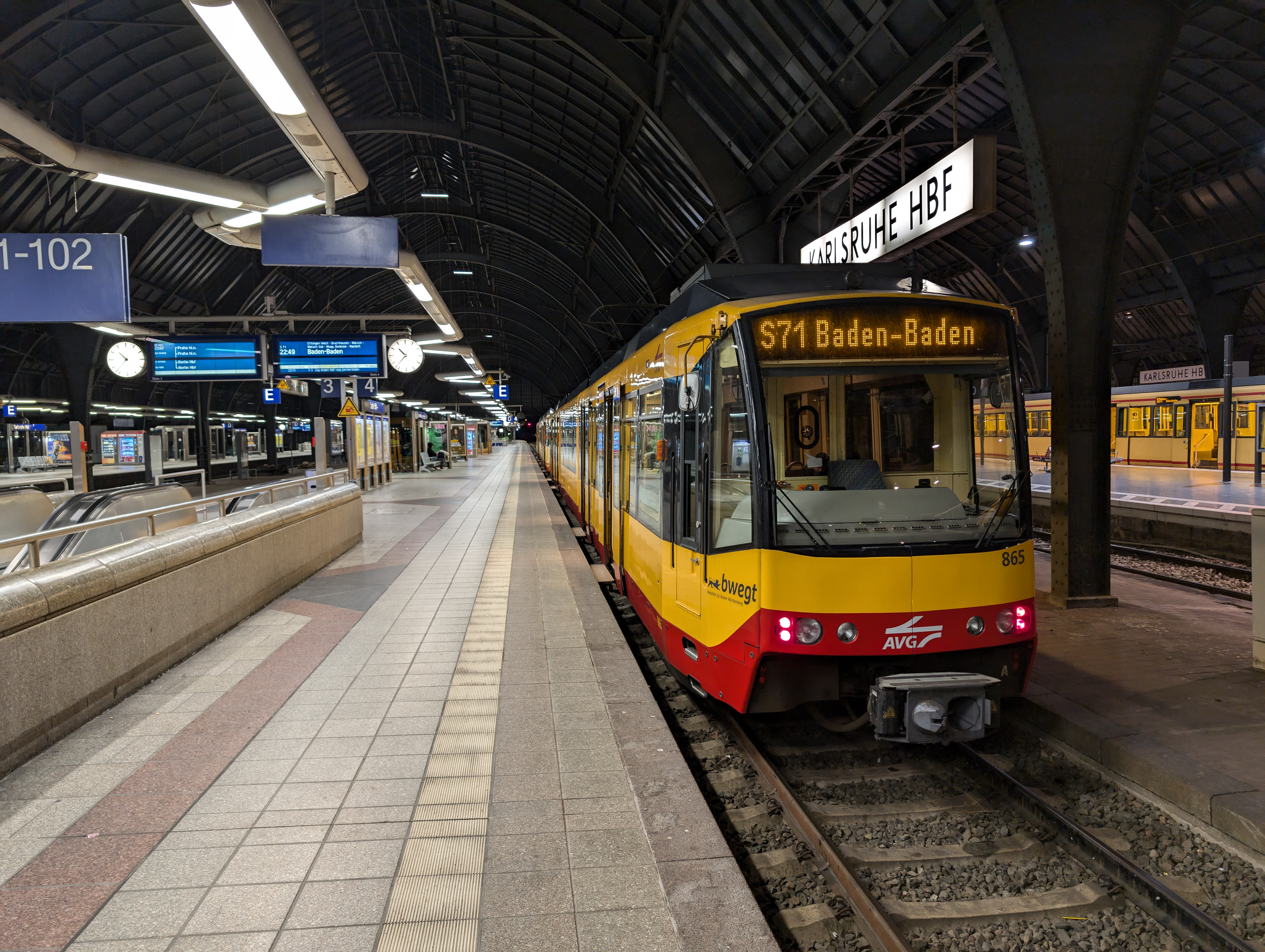
- A Stadtbahn LRV at Karlsruhe Hauptbahnhof

Overview
- Locale: Karlsruhe, Baden-Württemberg, Germany
- Transit type: Light rail (Stadtbahn)
- Number of lines: 12
- Number of stations: 190
- Daily ridership: 192,876
- Annual ridership: 70,400,000
- Website: AVG and KVV

Operation
- Began operation: 25 September 1992
- Operators: Albtal Verkehrs Gesellschaft mbH (AVG); Karlsruher Verkehrsverbund (KVV)

Technical
- System length: 262.4 km (163.0 mi) (660 km (410 mi) including track operated by Deutsche Bahn)
- Track gauge: 1,435 mm (4 ft 8 1/2 in) standard gauge
- Electrification: 750 V DC; 15 kV 16.7 Hz AC
Karlsruhe Stadtbahn network (2020)

The Karlsruhe Stadtbahn is a German tram-train system combining tram lines in the city of Karlsruhe with railway lines in the surrounding countryside, serving the entire region of the middle upper Rhine valley and creating connections to neighbouring regions. The Stadtbahn combines an efficient urban railway in the city with an S-Bahn (suburban railway), overcoming the boundary between trams and trains. Its logo does not include the green and white S-Bahn symbol used in other German suburban rail systems and the symbol is only used at stops and stations outside the inner-city tram-operation area.

The idea to link tram and railway lines with one another in order to be able to offer an attractive transport system for town and outskirts was developed in Karlsruhe and implemented gradually in the 1980s and 1990s, with the system commencing operation in 1992. This idea, known as the Karlsruhe model or tram-train, has been adapted by other European cities. A new section in tunnel through central Karlsruhe was completed in December 2021.

Despite the name Stadtbahn, it shares very little technology with other Stadtbahn systems like Frankfurt and Stuttgart, making it far closer to tram-train and to a lesser extent S-Bahn systems.

The Karlsruhe Stadtbahn is operated in co-operation by Albtal-Verkehrs-Gesellschaft (Alb valley transport corporation, AVG), Verkehrsbetriebe Karlsruhe (Karlsruhe transport authority, VBK) and Deutsche Bahn (DB). The two urban transport operators, VBK and AVG, operate most services, while DB is responsible for the sections from Pforzheim and Bretten to Bietigheim-Bissingen. As of 2013, AVG quotes the size of the part of the Karlsruhe Stadtbahn system that is not operated by DB as 262.4 kilometres (163.0 mi), with 12 lines serving 190 stations.

== Network ==
The Karlsruhe Stadtbahn includes thirteen lines, in four different forms:

- Tram lines under the German law regulating tram operations, in a modernised form with a large proportion of segregated track and priority at traffic lights. These lines are electrified at 750 V DC. This is Stadtbahn line S2, operated by VBK in addition to its own seven tram lines.

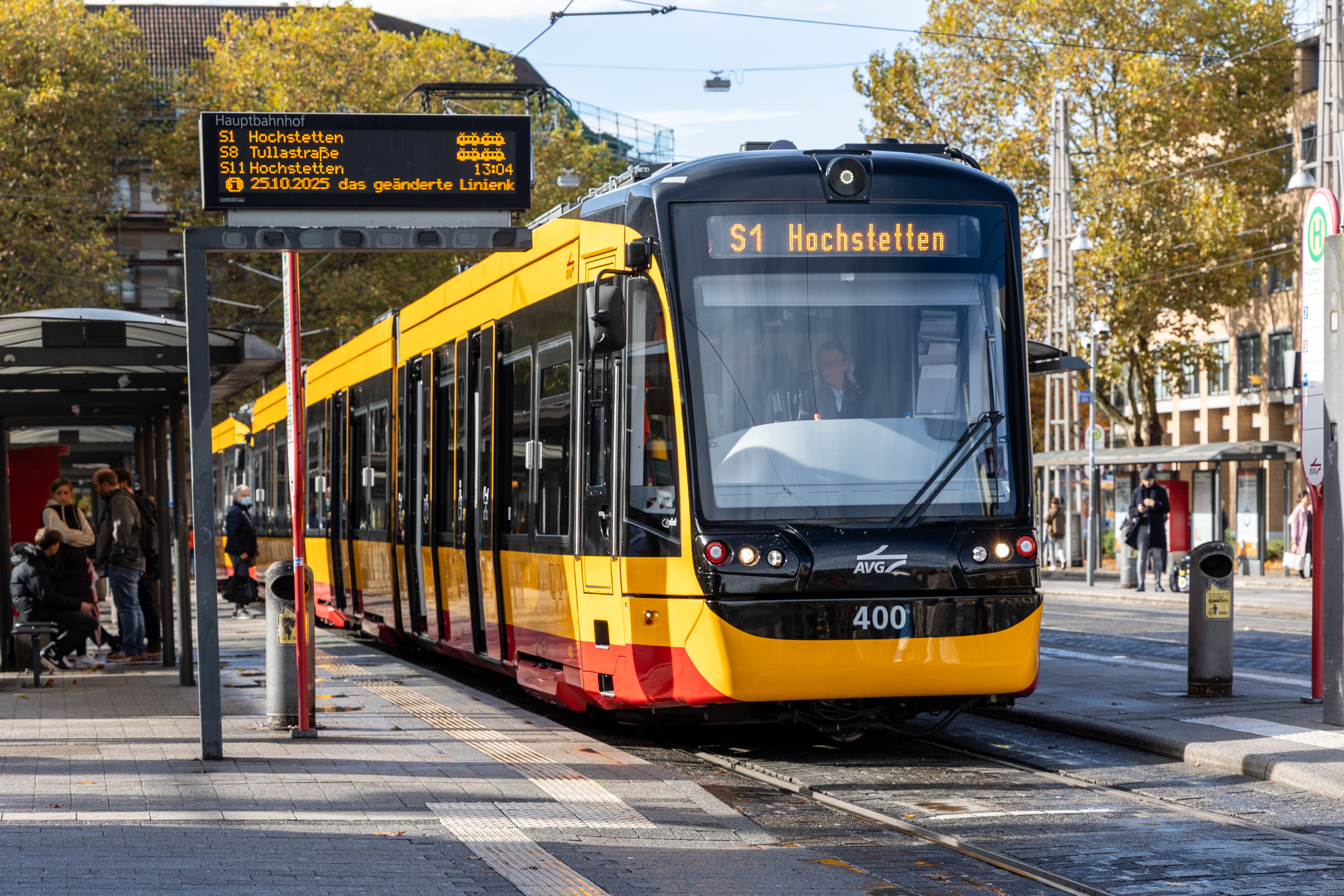
S1 at Karlsruhe station

- A combination of tram line sections within urban Karlsruhe and the secondary lines of the AVG, electrified at 750 V DC. These are Stadtbahn lines S1, S11 and S12.
- A combination of tram line sections within urban Karlsruhe, Wörth am Rhein, Bad Wildbad and Heilbronn, electrified at 750 V DC, and the railway lines of the DB and AVG, electrified at 15 kV AC, 16.7 Hz. These are Stadtbahn lines S4, S41, S42, S5, S51, S52, S6, S7 and S8.
- Pure rail operations on DB and AVG tracks, electrified at 15 kV AC. These are Stadtbahn lines S31 S32, S71 and S81.

=== Lines ===
Line no.	Route	No. of stations	Railways	Operator
S 1	Hochstetten – Eggenstein-Leopoldshafen – Neureut – Yorckstraße – Marktplatz – Hauptbahnhof – Alb Valley Railway – Rüppurr – Ettlingen – Busenbach – Bad Herrenalb	54	Hardt Railway, Alb Valley Railway	AVG, VBK
S 11	Hochstetten – Eggenstein-Leopoldshafen – Neureut – Yorckstraße – Marktplatz – Hauptbahnhof – Albtalbahnhof – Rüppurr – Ettlingen – Busenbach – Ittersbach	56	Hardt Railway, Alb Valley Railway, Busenbach–Ittersbach railway	AVG, VBK
S 12	Karlsruhe Rheinhafen – Lameyplatz – Yorckstraße – Europaplatz – Kolpingplatz – Albtalbahnhof – Ettlingen – Busenbach – Langensteinbach – Ittersbach (doesn't call at all stations)	27	Alb Valley Railway, Busenbach–Ittersbach railway	AVG, VBK
S 2	Spöck – Blankenloch – Hagsfeld – Durlacher Tor – Marktplatz – Entenfang – Daxlanden – Rheinstetten Occasional limited service trains take a different route via Ettlinger Tor (instead of Marktplatz)	47	Karlsruher Lokalbahn, Entenfang–Rheinstetten Stadtbahn line	AVG, VBK
S 31	Hauptbahnhof – Durlach – Bruchsal – Ubstadt Ort – Odenheim	16	Rhine Valley Railway, Katzbach Railway	AVG
S 32	Hauptbahnhof – Durlach – Bruchsal – Ubstadt Ort – Menzingen	18	Katzbach Railway, Rhine Valley Railway, Kraich Valley Railway	AVG
S 4	Albtalbahnhof – Karlsruhe Hbf – Rüppurrer Tor – Kronenplatz – Durlacher Tor – Tullastraße / VBK – Durlach – Grötzingen Oberausstraße – Bretten – Eppingen – Heilbronn – Weinsberg – Öhringen-Cappel	73	Rhine Valley Railway, Karlsruhe–Mühlacker Railway, Kraichgau Railway, Hohenlohe Railway	AVG, VBK, Stadtwerke Heilbronn
S 41	Heilbronn Hbf/Willy-Brandt-Platz – Harmonie / Kunsthalle – Neckarsulm – Bad Friedrichshall – Neckarelz – Mosbach	22	Franconia Railway, Neckar Valley Railway, Neckarelz–Osterburken railway	AVG, Stadtwerke Heilbronn
S 42	Heilbronn Hbf/Willy-Brandt-Platz – Harmonie / Kunsthalle – Neckarsulm – Bad Friedrichshall – Neckarelz – Mosbach – Bad Rappenau – Sinsheim	25	Franconia Railway, Meckesheim–Bad Friedrichshall railway	AVG, Stadtwerke Heilbronn
S 5	Wörth am Rhein – Maxau – Entenfang – Yorckstraße – Marktplatz – Durlacher Tor – Tullastraße / VBK – Durlach – Grötzingen Oberausstraße – Pfinztal – Pforzheim Occasional limited service trains take a different route and start/end at Albtalbahnhof, deviating from the regular Route at Marktplatz.	48	Winden–Karlsruhe railway, Karlsruhe–Mühlacker Railway	AVG, VBK
S 51	Germersheim – Bellheim – Rülzheim – Rheinzabern – Jockgrim – Wörth am Rhein – Maximiliansau – Knielingen Rheinbergstrasse – Karlsruhe Entenfang – Europaplatz – Durlacher Tor – Durlach Bahnhof – Grötzingen – Pfinztal (– Wilferdingen-Singen – Pforzheim Hbf)		Schifferstadt–Wörth railway, Winden–Karlsruhe railway	AVG, VBK
S 52	Germersheim – Bellheim – Rülzheim – Rheinzabern – Jockgrim – Wörth am Rhein – Maxau – Karlsruhe West – Karlsruhe Albtalbahnhof – Karlsruhe Hbf – Marktplatz		Schifferstadt–Wörth railway, Winden–Karlsruhe railway	AVG, VBK
S 6	Pforzheim – Neuenbürg – Bad Wildbad	19	Enz Valley Railway	AVG
S 7	Achern – Bühl – Baden-Baden – Rastatt– Durmersheim – Albtalbahnhof – Karlsruhe Hbf – Rüppurrer Tor – Kronenplatz – Durlacher Tor – Tullastraße / VBK	24	Rhine Railway, Rhine Valley Railway	AVG, VBK
S 71	Achern – Baden-Baden – Rastatt – Malsch – Karlsruhe Hbf	15	Rhine Valley Railway	AVG
S 8	Bondorf (b Herrenberg) – Eutingen im Gäu – Freudenstadt Hbf – Baiersbronn – Forbach – Rastatt – Durmersheim – Karlsruhe Hbf – Rüppurrer Tor – Kronenplatz – Tullastraße / VBK	65	Rhine Railway, Murg Valley Railway, Eutingen im Gäu–Schiltach railway, Stuttgart–Horb railway	AVG, VBK
S 81	Bondorf (b Herrenberg) – Eutingen im Gäu – Freudenstadt Hbf – Baiersbronn – Forbach – Rastatt – Malsch – Karlsruhe Hbf	53	Rhine Valley Railway, Murg Valley Railway	AVG

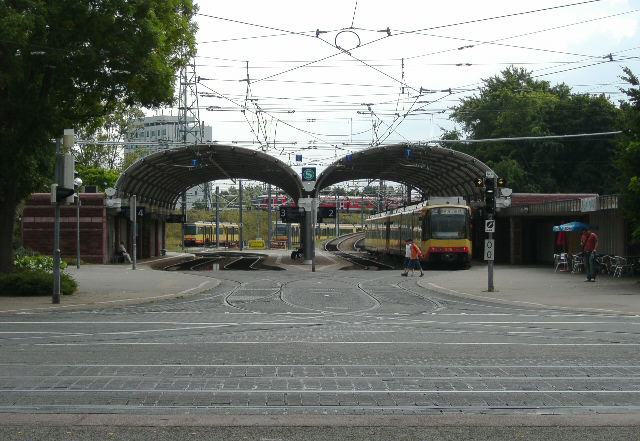
AVG station (Albtalbahnhof) in Karlsruhe; behind to the right is the ramp towards the DB tracks towards Rastatt, behind to the left is the AVG line to Ettlingen

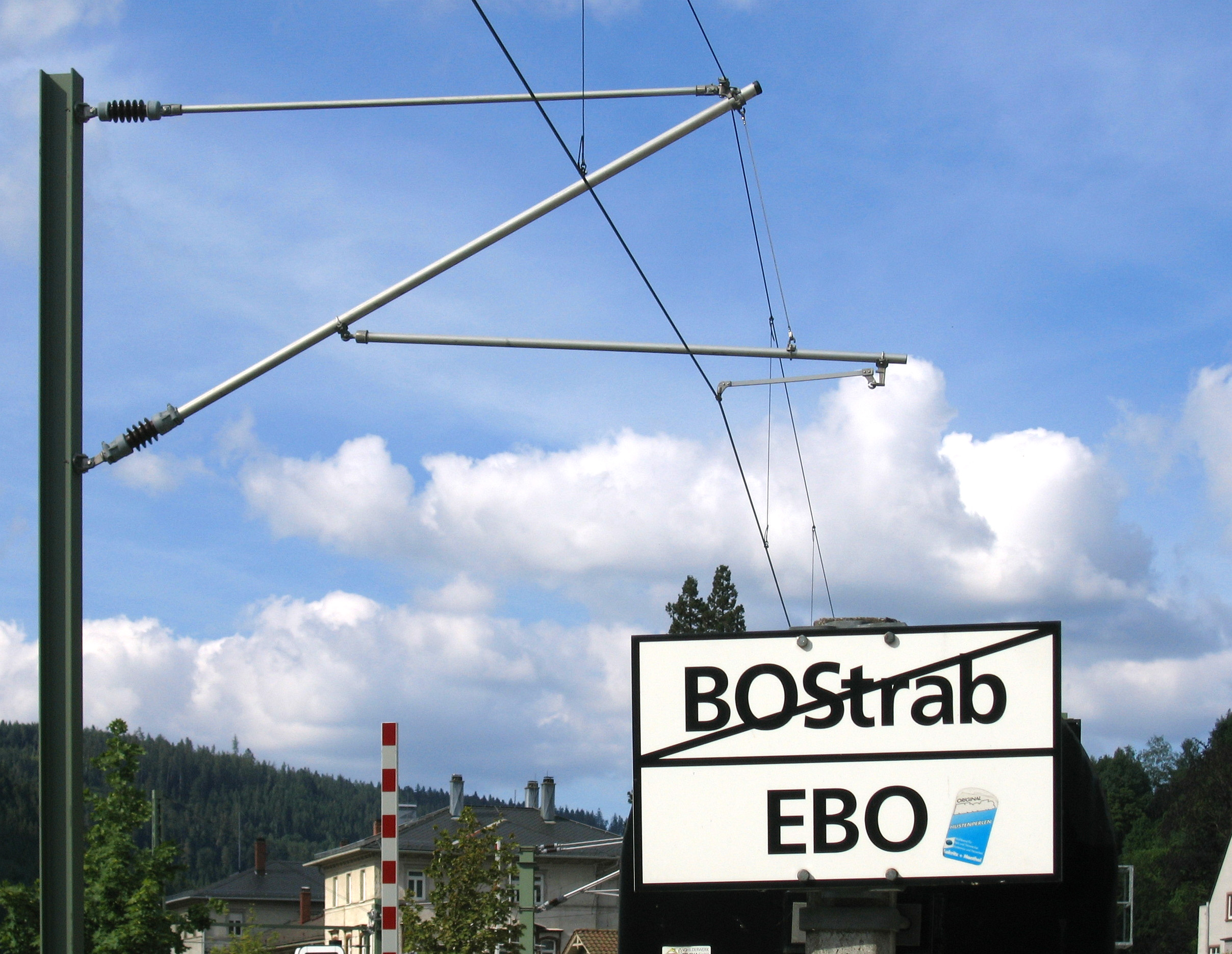
Notice marking the transition from tram operating procedures (BOStrab) to EBO

=== Former lines ===
In 2019, the S5 ceased operation between Pforzheim and Bietigheim-Bissingen, being replaced by MEX17a, operated by SWEG Südwestdeutsche Landesverkehrs-AG over the same line and stopping at the same stations. Operations between Pforzheim and Bietigheim-Bissingen were possible due to an agreement with German national operator DB, which allowed AVG to run their S5 services in slots assigned to trains of DB, effectively replacing them. As DB lost several of their lines near Stuttgart to private operators in 2019, the route between Pforzheim and Bietigheim-Bissingen was taken over by Abellio (now SWEG Bahn Stuttgart), ending the operation between Pforzheim and Bietigheim-Bissingen. The section between Pforzheim and Wörth Badepark runs mostly unchanged, with only changes in arrival and departure times.

In December 2022, the S9—by then renamed to S34 because line S9 of the Rhine-Neckar S-Bahn had been extended to Karlsruhe, causing confusion–ceased operation, being fully replaced by regional trains running as line MEX17c. Already, in 2019, most services of the S9 had been taken over by this line, leaving it with only few trains a day operated as S34.

Also during this time, S71 and S81 lost most of its trains to DB, leaving S71 with five trains a day and S81 with only two trains per day, one per direction.

=== Services ===
The following table shows the regular transport services on the individual Stadbahn lines as of December 2022. There are some deviations from the structure shown on weekends and late evenings/at night.

Lines	Section	Frequency	Remarks
S 1 S 11 Hochstetten – Karlsruhe – Bad Herrenalb/Ittersbach
S 1 S 11	Hochstetten – Neureut Kirchfeld	Every 20 minutes	Some trains transfer to the Leopoldshafen–KIT Campus Nord railway (only for authorised persons)
S 1 S 11	Neureut Kirchfeld – Ettlingen Albgaubad	Every 10 minutes	
S 1 S 11	Ettlingen Albgaubad – Busenbach	4 services/hour	
S 1	Busenbach – Bad Herrenalb	2 services/hour	
S 11	Busenbach – Ittersbach	Every 30 minutes	
S 12 Karlsruhe – Ittersbach
S 12	Karlsruhe Rheinhafen – Ittersbach	Some trains in the peak	Express train, does not stop at all stations. In the Karlsruhe area, does not run through the tunnel, but rather via Karlstrasse. One morning trip from Mühlburger Tor to Europahalle/Europabad.
S 2 Stutensee – Karlsruhe – Rheinstetten
S 2	Spöck – Blankenloch Nord	Every 20 minutes	
S 2	Blankenloch Nord – Karlsruhe Reitschulschlag	Every 10 minutes (peak); Every 20 minutes (off-peak)	In the peak some trains, running as expresses, do not stop at all stations.
S 2	Karlsruhe Reitschulschlag – Karlsruhe Rheinstrandsiedlung	Every 10 minutes	In the peak some trains, running as expresses, do not stop at all stations.
S 2	Karlsruhe Rheinstrandsiedlung – Mörsch Bach West	Every 10 minutes (peak); Every 20 minutes (off-peak)	In the peak some trains, running as expresses, do not stop at all stations.
S 31 S 32 Menzingen/Odenheim – Karlsruhe
S 31	Odenheim – Ubstadt Ort	Every 20 minutes (peak); Every 30 minutes. (off-peak)	In the peak some trains, running as expresses, do not stop at all stations.
S 32	Menzingen – Ubstadt Ort	Every 20 minutes (peak); Every 30 minutes. (off-peak)	In the peak some trains, running as expresses, do not stop at all stations.
S 31 S 32	Ubstadt Ort – Karlsruhe Hbf	2 services/hour	Generally, the S 31 and S 32 run coupled and split in Ubstadt Ort.
S 31 S 32	Karlsruhe Hbf – Bad Herrenalb	A pair of trains on Sundays and public holidays	Albtäler Freizeitexpress ("leisure time express") via Ettlingen West, Ettlingen Stadt, Busenbach. Does not stop at all stations.
S 4 Karlsruhe – Heilbronn – Öhringen
S 4	Karlsruhe Albtalbahnhof – Flehingen	2 services/hour	All stops except Durlach Hubstrasse.
S 4	Flehingen – Schwaigern West	Every 60 minutes	Some express services in the peaks in both directions to/from Eppingen
S 4	Schwaigern West – Heilbronn Hbf	Every 30 minutes	
S 4	Heilbronn Hbf – Heilbronn Pfühlpark	Every 15 minutes (peak) Every 30 minutes (off-peak)	
S 4	Heilbronn Pfühlpark – Öhringen-Cappel	Every 30 minutes	in the peak some trains to/from Weinsberg or Eschenau
S 41 Heilbronn – Mosbach (Baden)
S 41	Heilbronn Hbf – Mosbach (Baden)	Every 60 minutes	Additional peak trips between Mosbach-Neckarelz and Mosbach (Baden)
S 42 Heilbronn – Sinsheim (Elsenz)
S 42	Heilbronn Hbf – Bad Rappenau	Every 30 minutes	Some services continue as S4 to/from Schwaigern West
S 42	Bad Rappenau – Sinsheim (Elsenz) Hbf	Every 60 minutes	
S 5 S 51 Germersheim/Wörth – Karlsruhe – Pforzheim
S 5	Wörth Badepark – Wörth Bahnhof	Every 20 minutes	
S 51	Germersheim – Wörth Bahnhof	Every 60 minutes	In the peak some trains, running as expresses, do not stop at all stations.
S 5 S 51	Wörth Bahnhof – Knielingen Rheinbergstraße	4 services/hour	Trains on line S 51 do not stop in Karlsruhe Maxau during the day.
S 5 S 51	Knielingen Rheinbergstraße – Berghausen (Baden)	Every 10 minutes	In the peak, some additional S51 journeys running as expresses between Germersheim and Karlsruhe Tullastraße, do not stop at all stations and travel via Kriegsstraße instead of through the tunnel. In the peak, some additional S5 journeys running as expresses peak Karlsruhe Albtalbahnhof and Pforzheim do not stop at all stations.
S 5 S 51	Karlsruhe Albtalbahnhof – Karlsruhe Marktplatz	Some trains	In the peak S5 expresses run Karlsruhe Albtalbahnhof – Pforzheim. Some S5/51 services run to/from Wörth in the late evening.
S 5	Karlsruhe Hbf – Karlsruhe-Durlach	Some trains	Some express or sprinter journeys run to/from Söllingen/Pforzheim via DB tracks.
S 5 S 51	Berghausen (Baden) – Söllingen (b Karlsruhe)	Every 10 minutes (peak); Every 20 minutes (off-peak)	In the peak, some additional S5 journeys running as expresses between Karlsruhe Albtalbahnhof and Pforzheim do not stop at all stations.
S 5	Söllingen (b Karlsruhe) – Pforzheim Hbf	2 services/hour	Usually one trip every hour as the S 6 from/to Bad Wildbad. In the peak, some additional S5 journeys running as expresses between Karlsruhe Albtalbahnhof and Pforzheim do not stop at all stations.
S 52 Karlsruhe – Germersheim
S 52	Every 60 minutes in the morning and afternoon	Most journeys are expresses and do not stop at all stations	
S 6 Pforzheim – Bad Wildbad
S 6	Pforzheim Hbf – Bad Wildbad Kurpark	Every 30 minutes Every 60 minutes (morning, late evening)	Usually one trip every hour as the S 5 from/to Wörth.
S 7 S 8 Karlsruhe – Rastatt – Achern/Freudenstadt
S 7 S 8	Karlsruhe Tullastraße – Rastatt über Marktplatz, Albtalbahnhof, Durmersheim	2 services/hour	
S 7	Rastatt – Achern	Every 60 minutes	
S 8	Rastatt – Freudenstadt Stadt	Every 60 minutes	
S 8	Freudenstadt Stadt – Freudenstadt Hbf	2 services/hour	
S 8	Freudenstadt Hbf – Bondorf (b Herrenberg)	2 services/hour	
S 71 S 81 Karlsruhe – Rastatt – Achern/Bondorf
S 71	Karlsruhe Hauptbahnhof – Achern via Ettlingen West	Some trains	
S 81	Karlsruhe Hauptbahnhof – Bondorf via Ettlingen West	One trip daily	Since Winter 2022/2023 as RB

== History ==
Karlsruhe attempted to create a network of street and interurban tram lines for the development of the surrounding countryside, modelled on the Oberrheinische Eisenbahn-Gesellschaft. However, by the middle of the twentieth century there had been little lasting achievement due to the difficult economic times in between.

=== Acquisition and extension of the Alb Valley Railway ===
The acquisition of the Alb Valley Railway (Albtalbahn) by the city of Karlsruhe, the establishment of AVG and the integration of the Alb Valley Railway cross-country line into the Karlsruhe tram system between 1957 and 1966 formed the foundation for the later Stadtbahn network. The Alb Valley Railway was connected to the tram system and electrified as a tramway, so that modified trams could run through between the southern outskirts and Karlsruhe city centre.

The success of the Alb Valley Railway encouraged the Karlsruhe planners in the 1960s to connect the northern surrounding outskirts by a modern tram/stadbahn system as well. For this it negotiated with Deutsche Bundesbahn to use the Hardt Railway (Karlsruhe-Neureut-Eggenstein-Leopoldshafen), sharing with the local goods traffic, and reached an agreement at the end of the 1970s. After building a connecting line between the tram network and the railway line in 1979 the tram service shared the railway line for 2 km (1.2 mi) to Neureut, where the few remaining goods trains left the line. In 1986 and 1989 the Stadbahn was extended north to Leopoldshafen and Linkenheim-Hochstetten and to the Forschungszentrum Karlsruhe, again sharing existing railway tracks. Since the remaining goods traffic was hauled by diesel locomotives, the electrification of the line with the tramway’s 750 V DC system did not cause technical problems.

=== Line B: introduction of tram-trains ===
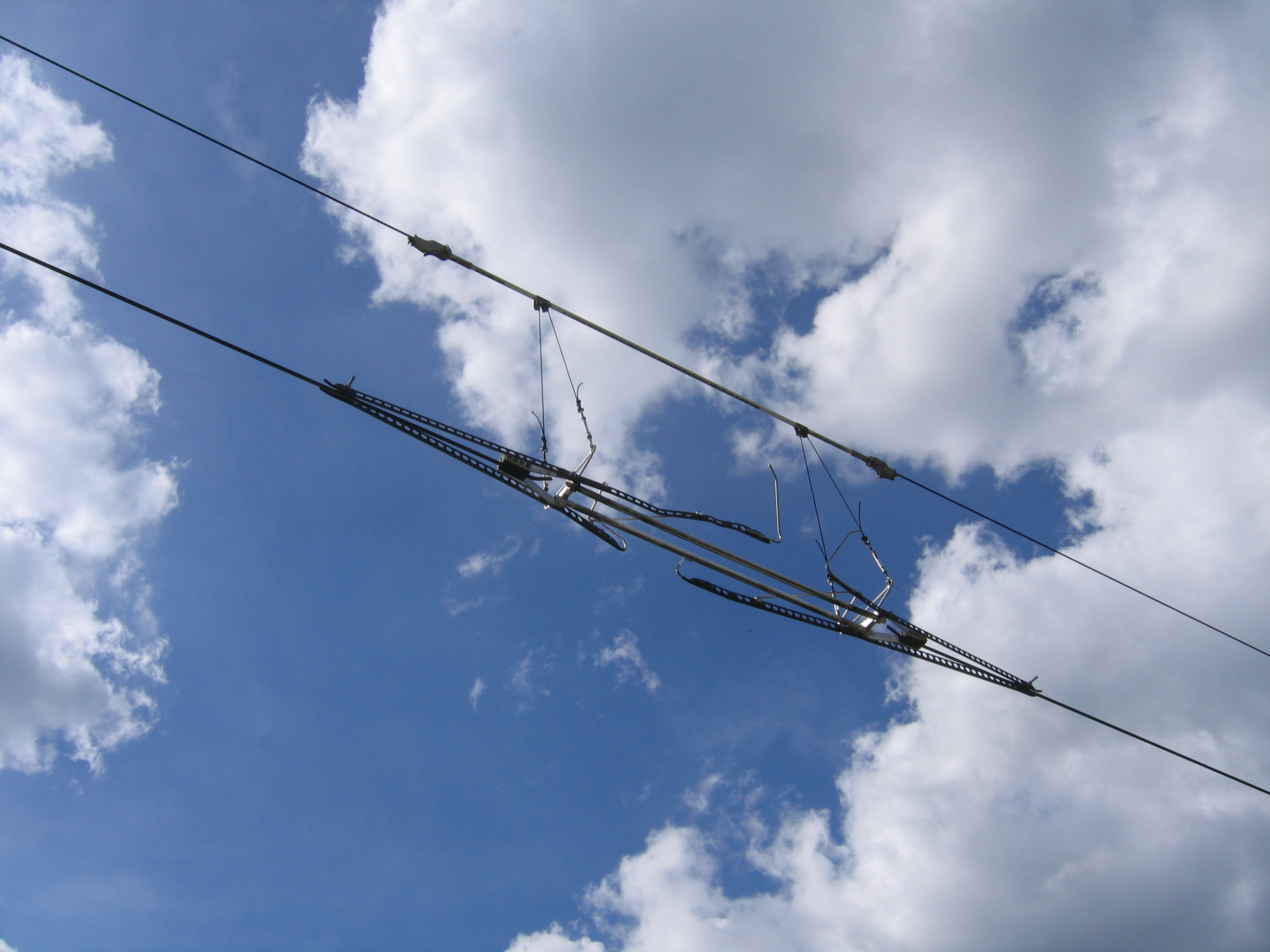
System change in the overhead wiring: the wire is replaced by ceramic rods to isolate the two systems from each other

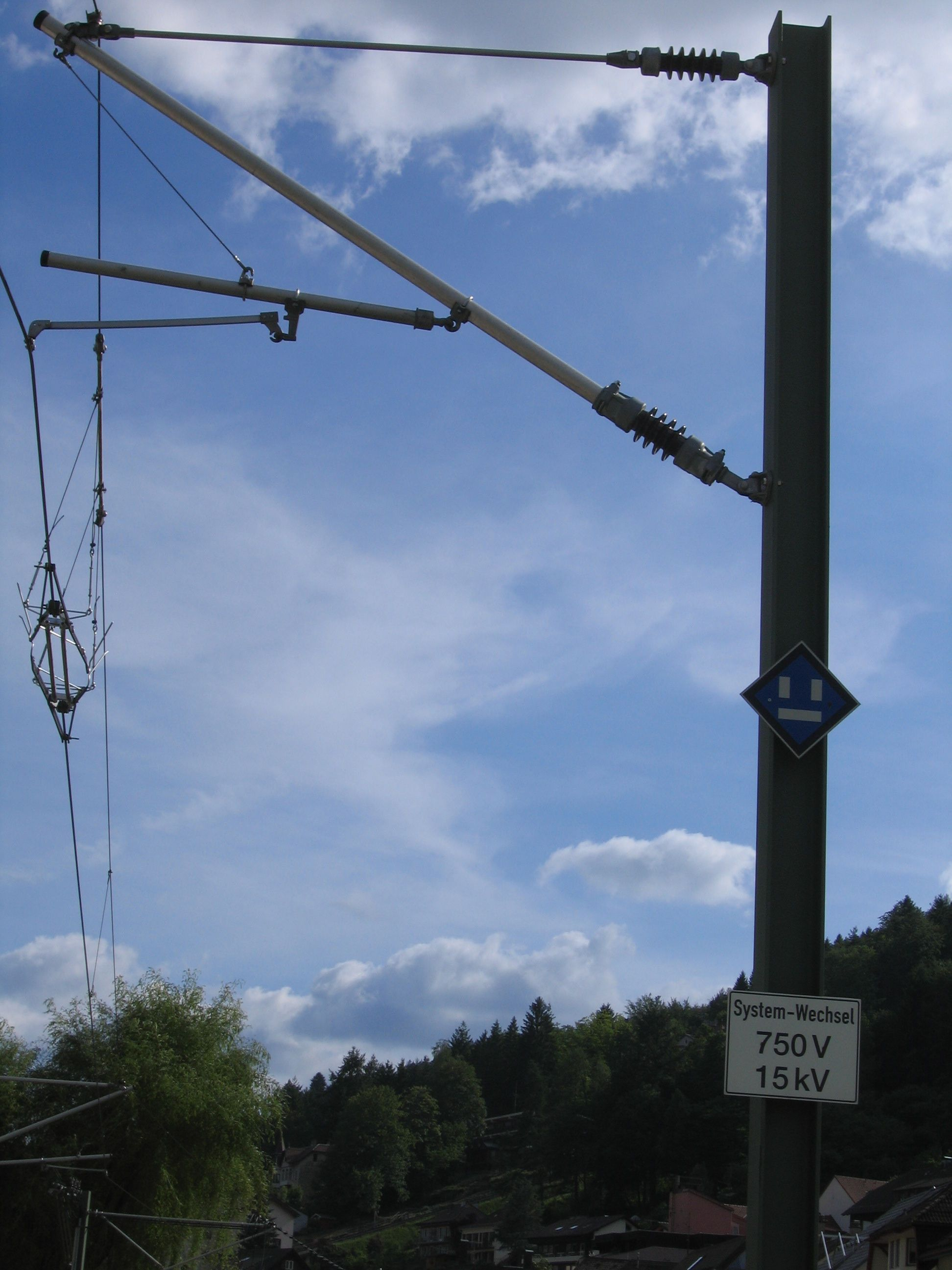
System change in Bad Wildbad

Apart from the Stadtbahn line Hochstetten–Karlsruhe–Alb Valley (formerly line A, since 1994 lines S1/S11), a further Stadtbahn line, S2 (Stutensee-Karlsruhe-Rheinstetten), was built in stages between 1989 and 2006, extending an existing city tram line. This line connects the northeast with the southwest suburbs. This line included single-track sections in the main streets of the local centres of Blankenloch, Forchheim and Mörsch. This route through the centres was preferred to a route on the edge of these localities or in a tunnel because it was seen as promoting development.

While the development of the lines to the nearby northern and southern municipalities could be achieved by use of the Alb Valley and Hardt Railway and by building new tram lines, this was not true of the eastern suburbs. Therefore, shared operations over the existing railway lines was considered, although they were electrified, at least in sections, with the 15 kV system of the main-line railway. After development of a Stadtbahn vehicle, with the electrical systems of both trams and railways, that could be operated under both the tram and rail regulations, lengthy negotiations with DB were required (well before rail reform legally permitted access by other rail operators to Germany’s rail infrastructure) before it was agreed that the Karlsruhe Stadtbahn could share the Karlsruhe–Bretten line.

In 1992, Stadtbahn operations between Karlsruhe and Bretten-Gölshausen started on the Kraichgau Railway (then line B, now S4). The tram and rail networks were linked by building a connecting line between Durlacher Allee and Grötzingen station. This connecting line also contains the equipment that controls the change between the two electrification systems.

=== Extension of the network ===
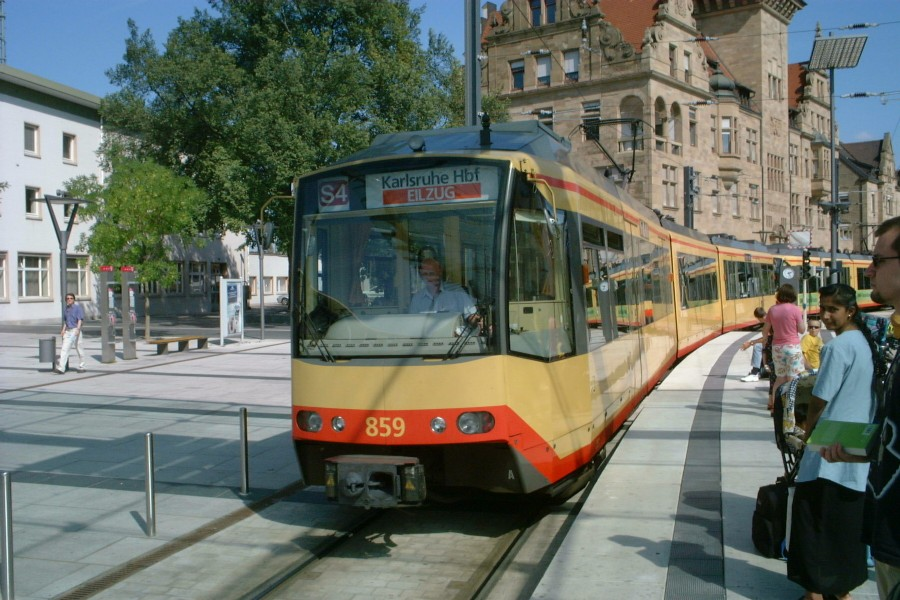
A Stadtbahn Karlsruhe service running on tram line in Heilbronn

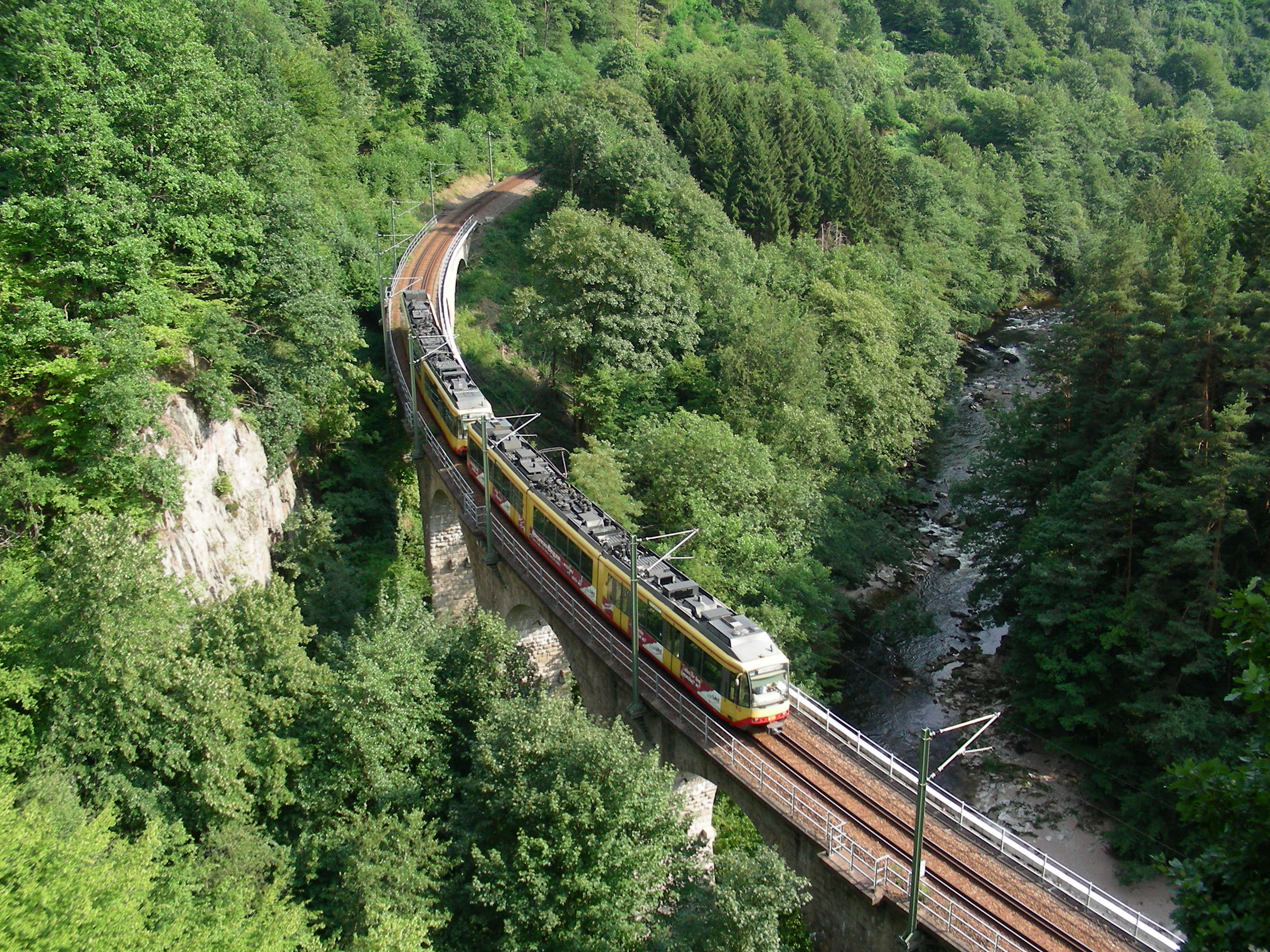
Stadtbahn train on line S8 on Murg Valley Railway (Nordschwarzwald)

The unexpected success of the new Stadtbahn line between Karlsruhe and Bretten (passenger numbers increased fivefold in just a few weeks) led to an accelerated development of the Stadtbahn system in the 1990s. The modernisation and integration of additional lines resulted in the following extensions:

- 1994: to Baden-Baden via Durmersheim and Rastatt as preliminary service via DB tracks, to Bruchsal via Weingarten; Bretten - Bruchsal
- 1996: Bruchsal to Menzingen; Karlsruhe inner city to Baden-Baden via Rastatt
- 1997: to Pforzheim via Pfinztal; Bretten to Eppingen/Wörth
- 1998: Bruchsal to Odenheim
- 1999: Bretten to Mühlacker; Pforzheim to Bietigheim-Bissingen; Eppingen to Heilbronn central station (Hauptbahnhof)
- 2001: Heilbronn central station (Hauptbahnhof) to Heilbronn city centre (new construction)
- 2002: Rastatt to Forbach on the Murg Valley Railway; Pforzheim to Bad Wildbad
- 2003: Forbach to Freudenstadt on the Murg Valley Railway; Bad Wildbad town tram line (new construction)
- 2004: Baden-Baden to Achern
- 2005: Heilbronn to Öhringen
- 2006: Blankenloch to Spöck; Freudenstadt central station (Hauptbahnhof) to Eutingen im Gäu
- 2010: Wörth to Germersheim

=== New tunnel in Karlsruhe ===
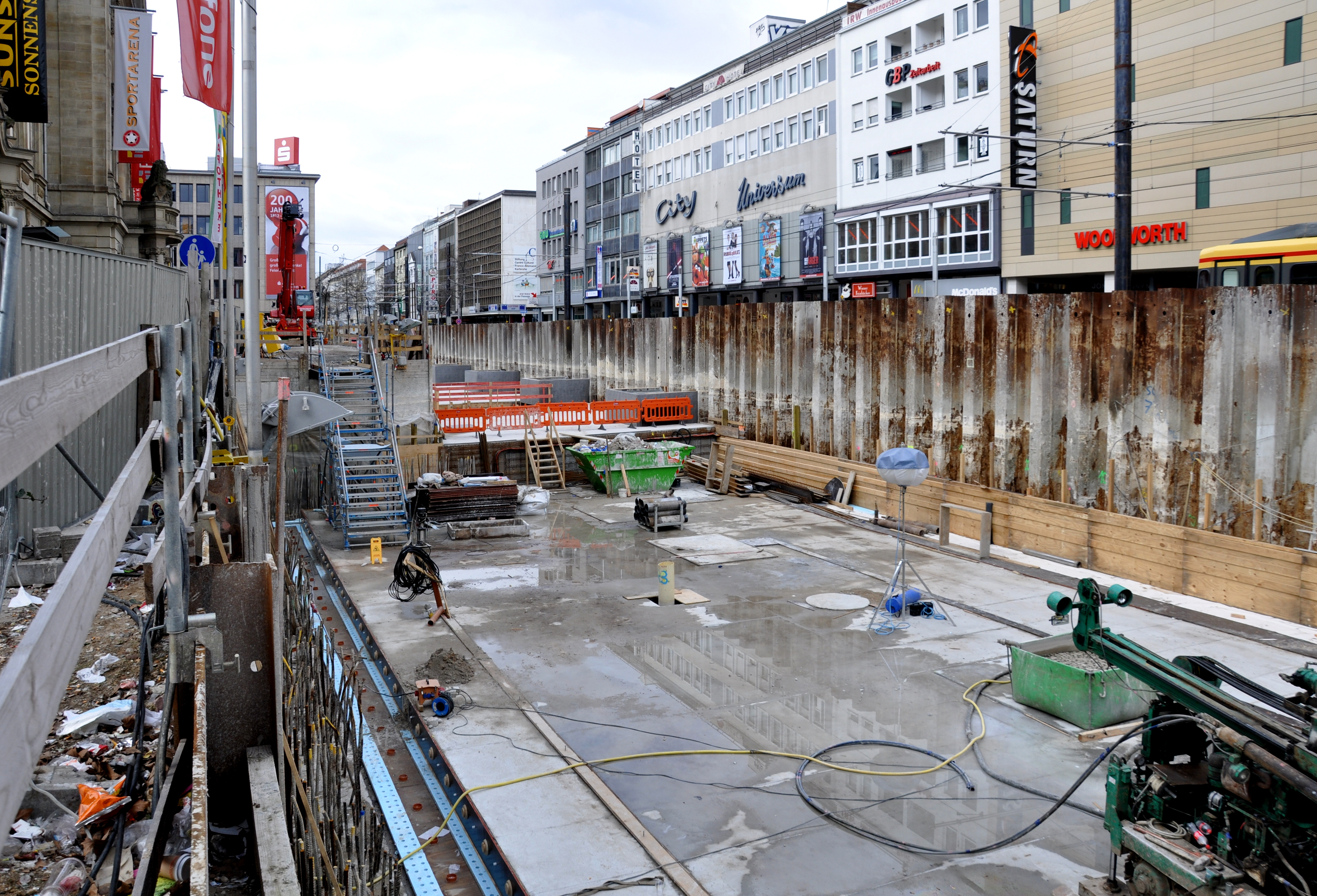
Construction of the underground station in Europaplatz in February 2012

A tunnel has been built in central Karlsruhe, for Stadtbahn lines S 1 / S 11, S 2, S 4 / S 41 and S 5 / S 51 / S 52 and various tram lines. It was opened in December 2021. The tunnel runs under Durlacher Allee and Kaiserstraße with a junction under Marktplatz connecting to a tunnel under Ettlinger Straße. The tunnel ramps were built in the area of the former stops of Mühlburger Tor, Gottesauer Platz and Augartenstraße. New stations were built to replace these stops above ground at the end of the ramps. A new stop was built for tram line 3 in Grashofstrasse at Mühlburger Tor as the line branches off there; the new stop is not used by Stadtbahn trains. The Herrenstraße stop in the pedestrian zone was closed without replacement.

The tunnel shortened the travel time for the Stadtbahn through the pedestrian zone and improved the stability of the timetable. In addition, the platforms of the station's tunnel have pedestals that are about 15 metres (49 ft) long with a height of 55 cm (22 in) above the rail so that the first two doors of Stadtbahn trains have step-less entry. This made possible stepless entrance on lines S 4 / S 41 and S 5 / S 51 / S 52 in Karlsruhe for the first time, reflecting a trend that has long been standard elsewhere. The platforms cannot consistently have a height of 55 cm (22 in), because the tunnel is used by trams and DC services of the Stadtbahn, which have an entry level on the modern lines of 34 cm (13 in).

Since line S 2 formerly met Kaiserstraße at Durlacher Tor on Durlacher Allee, where there is no entrance to the tunnel, it was rerouted to branch off its former route at Hauptfriedhof and continue from there to Tullastraße.

== Rolling stock ==
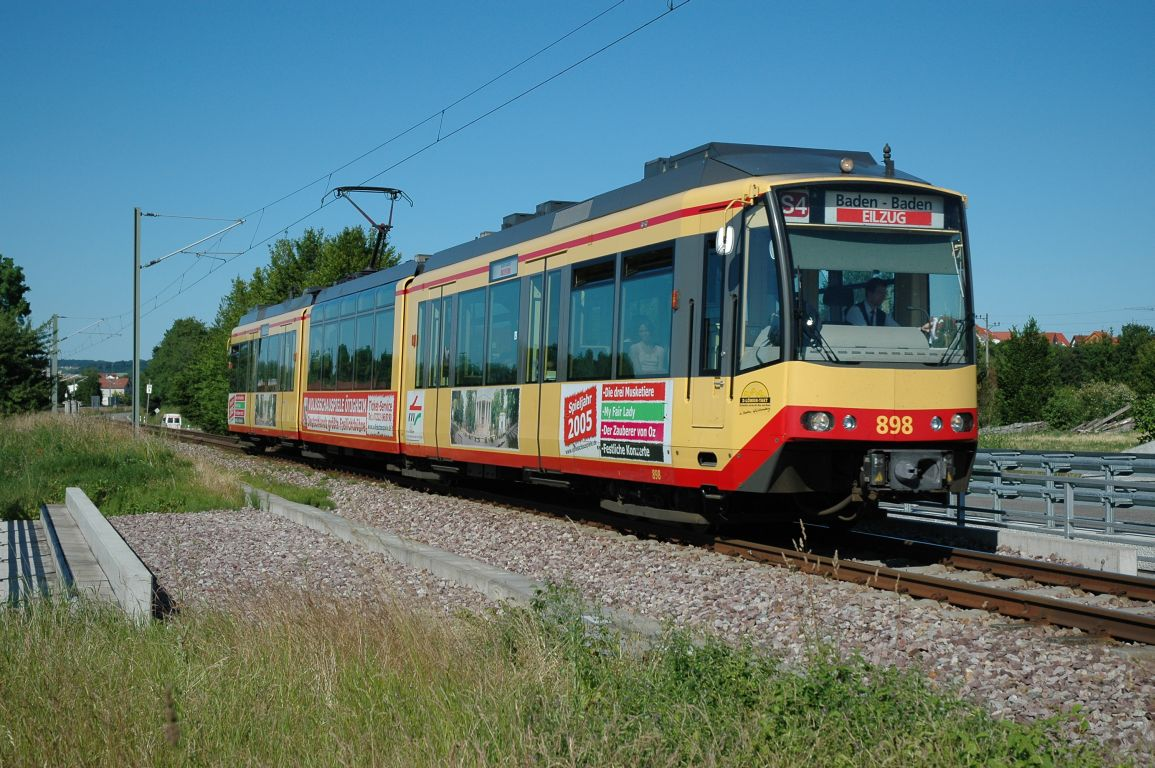
Two-system car 898 of the AVG of type GT8-100D/2S-M

Stadtbahn cars of the Karlsruhe type have been used since 1983 (such as class GT6-80C). The fleet includes 60 single-current vehicles for the direct current services only and operate on lines S1, S11 and S2. This type was derived from the Stadtbahnwagen B. 40 vehicles are 38 m (125 ft)-long 8-axle cars, while the remaining 20 6-axle cars are 28 m (92 ft)-long.

An 8-axle two-system car of the design GT8-100C/2S was developed for services running under a mixture of DC and AC lines from the DC vehicles, and 36 examples were supplied between 1991 and 1995. As technology advanced the follow-up design GT8-100D/2S-M was developed in 1997 and 85 vehicles were delivered up to 2005, carrying the numbers 837–922. In the autumn of 2009, 30 new two-car Flexity Swift sets were ordered, with an option for a further 45 sets. To bridge the bottleneck in deliveries at the end of 2009 three Flexity Link sets were borrowed from the Saarbahn.

In the two-area system served by the GT8-100D/2S-M Flexity Swift vehicles, 55 cm (22 in) high platforms were built to provide step-free entrances. These were mostly built on the newer line (especially the Murg Valley, Enz Valley, the line to Odenheim and the Kraichgau line to Eppingen) while the older routes have been only been sporadically raised to this height. The Rhine-Neckar S-Bahn on the other hand, uses 76 cm (30 in) high platforms for accessibility on the Durlach–Bruchsal section, but only at Durlach and Bruchsal stations. These stations have been equipped with the conversion to S-Bahn operations with platforms of heights of both 55 and 76 cm (22 and 30 in).

The older two-system and all single-system high-floor Stadtbahn vehicles do not offer barrier-free entry. These trains run on line S 2, but alternate with low-floor vehicles of class GT6-70D/N or GT8-70D/N which are also operated on most urban tram lines and provide accessible entrance at the 34 cm (13 in) high platforms. The single-system Stadtbahn vehicles are to be replaced by low-floor vehicles by 2016 in preparation for the opening of the Stadtbahn tunnel being built in central Karlsruhe. The tender for these vehicles is being prepared.

There are currently a few stops in Karlsruhe city with platforms providing level access to two-system vehicles (such as those used on lines S 4 and S 5). The Stadtbahn tunnel will have platforms that are up to 80 m (260 ft) long with a height of 34 cm (13 in), which are raised to a height of 55 cm (22 in) for a length of 15 metres (49 ft) to give step-free access to the first two doors of two-system trains.

== Planned works ==
The extensive development of the network into the 1990s opened all of Karlsruhe’s surrounding countryside. The proposed urban tramways in Bruchsal, Rastatt, Baden-Baden and Landau failed to proceed, however, because of the political resistance of local politicians. A separate network, the Stadtbahn Heilbronn, was built in the Heilbronn area to link with line S4.

Few lines have been opened so far to the area west of the Rhine, the Vorderpfalz (eastern Palatinate). This area has a lower population density, has closer connections to Mannheim and Ludwigshafen and the railways connecting it to Karlsruhe are not electrified.

=== Reconstruction of the Karlsruhe Hauptbahnhof forecourt ===
On the forecourt of Karlsruhe Hauptbahnhof (Hauptbahnhof) there is a four-track station for trams and DC-powered Stadtbahn trains. There are platforms on both sides of the tracks. In the future, the heights of the platforms on the right hand side will remain at 34 cm (13 in) (the height of platform for trams) and on the left they will be lifted to 55 cm (22 in). This will make level boarding possible to all modern trains.

Weather protection will also be improved as part of the rebuilding, with the provision of roofs over individual platforms.

=== Connection to Baden-Airpark ===
For many years, a connection from Baden Airpark, the regional airport of Karlsruhe / Baden-Baden has been discussed. Initial planning focused on a route running via central Rastatt, Iffezheim and Hügelsheim, but there has been political opposition to this route in Rastatt. In recent years a route from Baden-Baden station to Baden-Airpark has been discussed along with continued discussion of a route from Rastatt, with or without crossing central Rastatt. Meanwhile, the results of the “standardised” cost–benefit analysis (Standardisierte Bewertung) used for German transport projects, show a moderately favourable value of 1.19 for the route via Baden station, and (a less favourable) value of 1.03 for the route from Rastatt generally along the route of the former Rastatt–Wintersdorf railway (of the former Mittelbadische Eisenbahnen).

=== Spöck–Karlsdorf-Neuthard–Bruchsal and Bruchsal–Hambrücken–Waghäusel ===
An extension of line S2 from Spöck to central Bruchsal and from there towards Waghäusel was also pursued until 2012. However, the standardised assessment did not show a cost-benefit ratio worth funding for any of the options examined, so the project was not pursued any further. After the evaluation criteria and the procedure were changed on 1 July 2022, the district council in the Karlsruhe district initiated a new standardised assessment for an extension of the S2 from Stutensee-Spöck to the north-western district.

== See also ==
- Verkehrsbetriebe Karlsruhe (VBK), the operating company for Karlsruhe city's Stadtbahn and tram lines
- Karlsruhe model, a tram-train developed and implemented by Karlsruher Verkehrsverbund (KVV), commencing service in 1992
