= Karlsruhe model =

Tram-train system developed in Germany

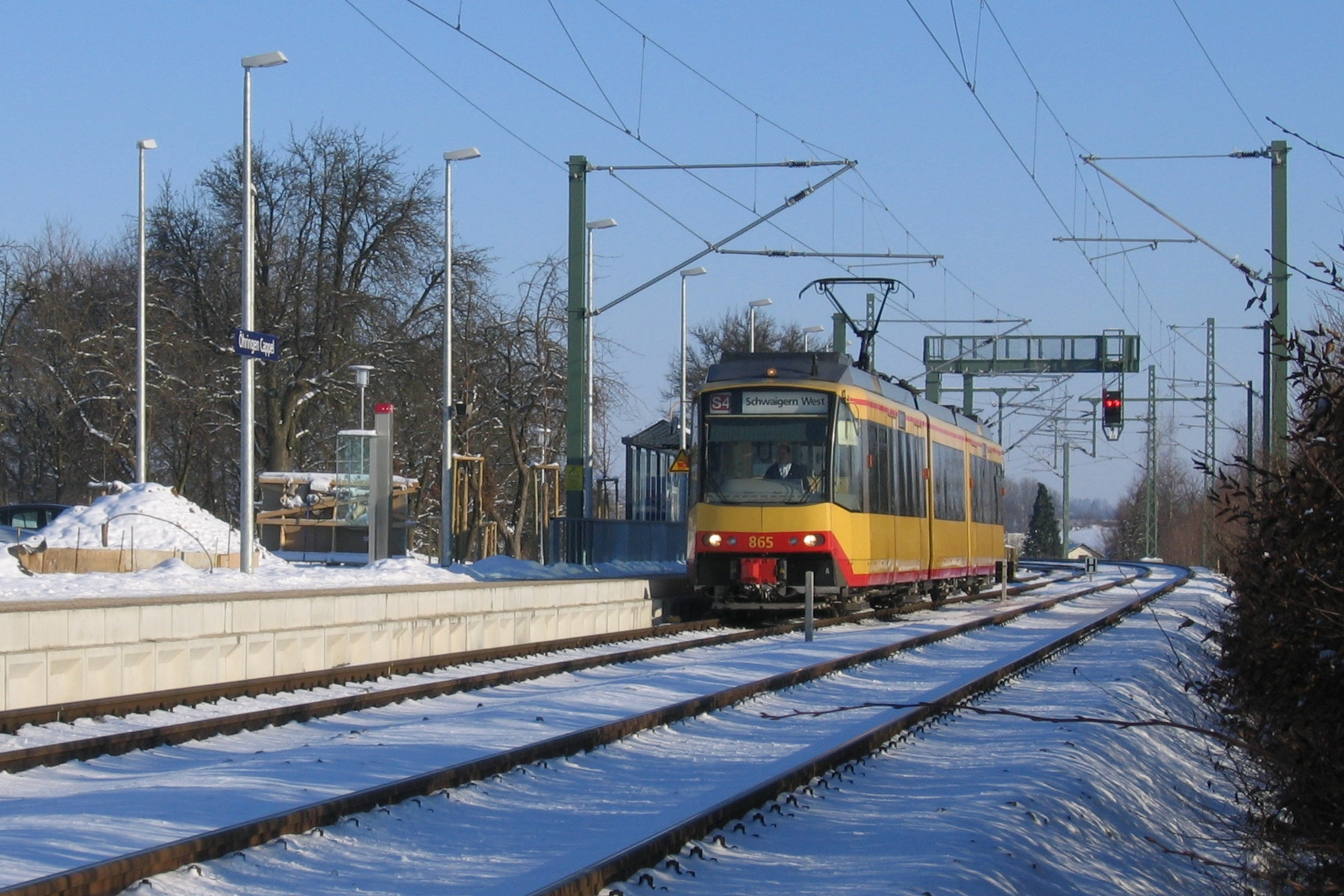
Stadtbahn on the mainline

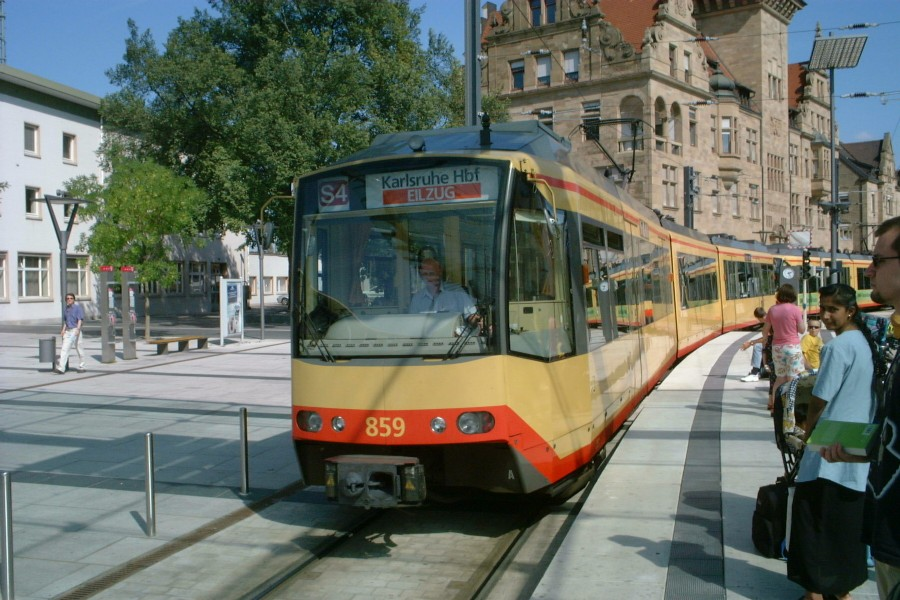
Street running of Stadtbahn in Heilbronn

The Karlsruhe model of public transport is a tram-train system which consists of tram/light rail trains and commuter/regional rail trains running on the same set of tracks, generally between or outside of urban areas. It was initially developed and implemented in the city of Karlsruhe, Germany, by the local transit authority, Karlsruher Verkehrsverbund (KVV).

== Overview ==
Commencing service in 1992, the system in Karlsruhe has provided a connection between the regular railway network and the city's local tram network. The whole system is now called the Karlsruhe Stadtbahn. Passengers may travel from distant towns such as Baden-Baden directly into the city centre of Karlsruhe, bridging the inconvenient distance between the main station and the city centre. For most trips, the number of train transfers has been reduced significantly.

This model has led to the creation of similar tram-train systems in other locations.

== Other examples ==
A similar model has been connecting the city of Vienna with the Baden suburb since 1886 as Lokalbahn Wien-Baden. Other systems that have implemented the Karlsruhe model include:

- City-Bahn Chemnitz, Germany
- Saarbahn, Germany
- Kassel RegioTram, Germany
- Nordhausen tramway network, Germany
- Tyne and Wear Metro, United Kingdom
- RandstadRail, Netherlands
- Athens Metro, Greece
- San Diego Trolley, United States
- Alicante Tram, Spain
- Sheffield Supertram, United Kingdom
- South Wales Metro, Wales
- Szeged-Hódmezővásárhely Tram-train, Hungary

In 2013, Adelaide Metro in Australia proposed the PortLINK project, which would have featured the Karlsruhe model for 4.8 km (3.0 mi) of track between Bowden and Woodville, followed by another 4.2 km (2.6 mi) to Port Adelaide.

== Train-trams ==
Zwickau, Germany, has reversed the Karlsruhe model by extending Lightweight RegioSprinter diesel trains from the main-line railway onto the street tramway as train-trams (Zwickau Model).

== See also ==
- Tram-train
- Karlsruhe Stadtbahn
- Stadtbahn
- Zurich model
