= Verkehrsbetriebe Karlsruhe =

- Industry: Public transport
- Headquarters: Karlsruhe, Germany
- Area served: Karlsruhe
- Parent: KVVH
- Website: www.vbk.info

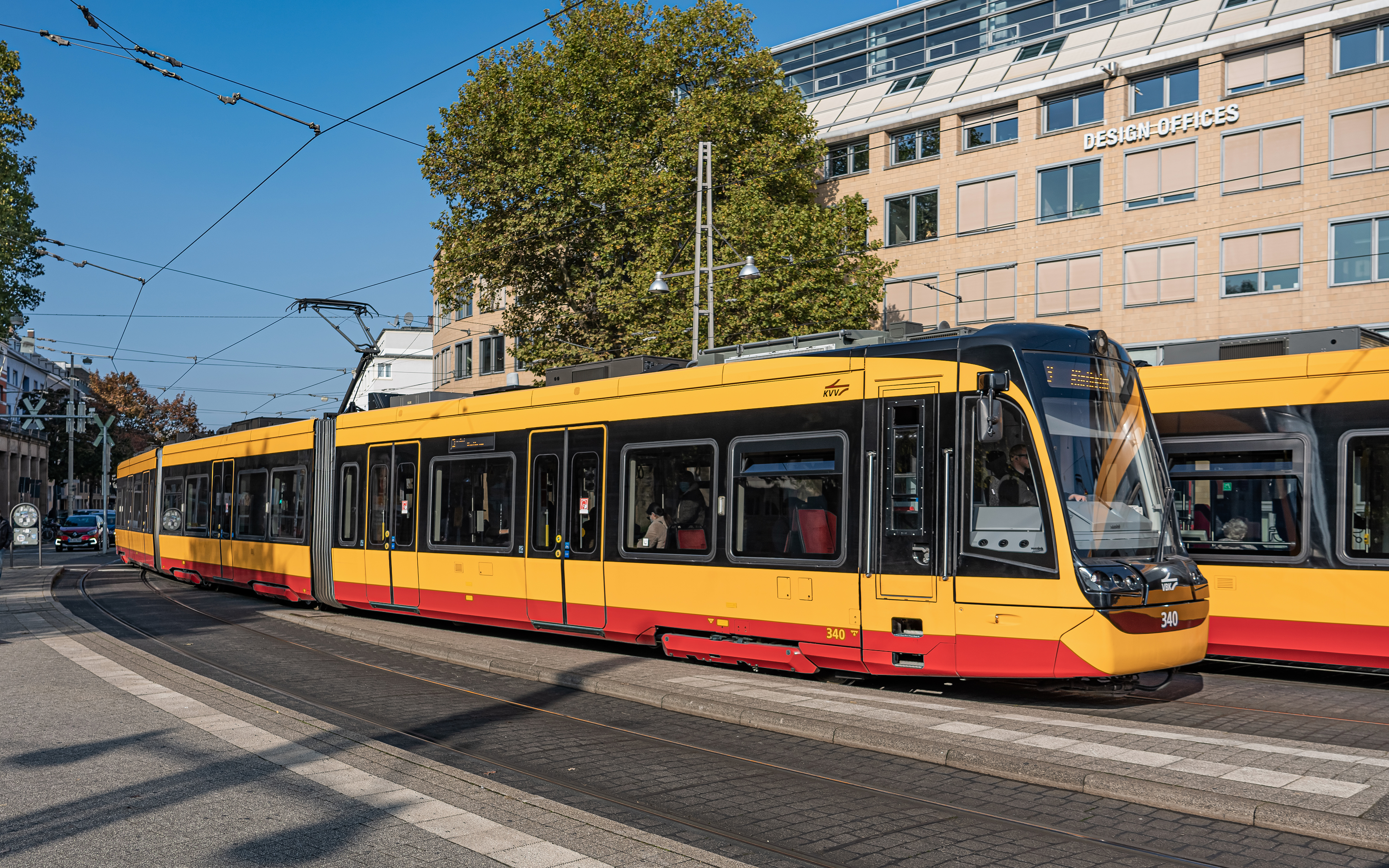
Tram in Karlsruhe

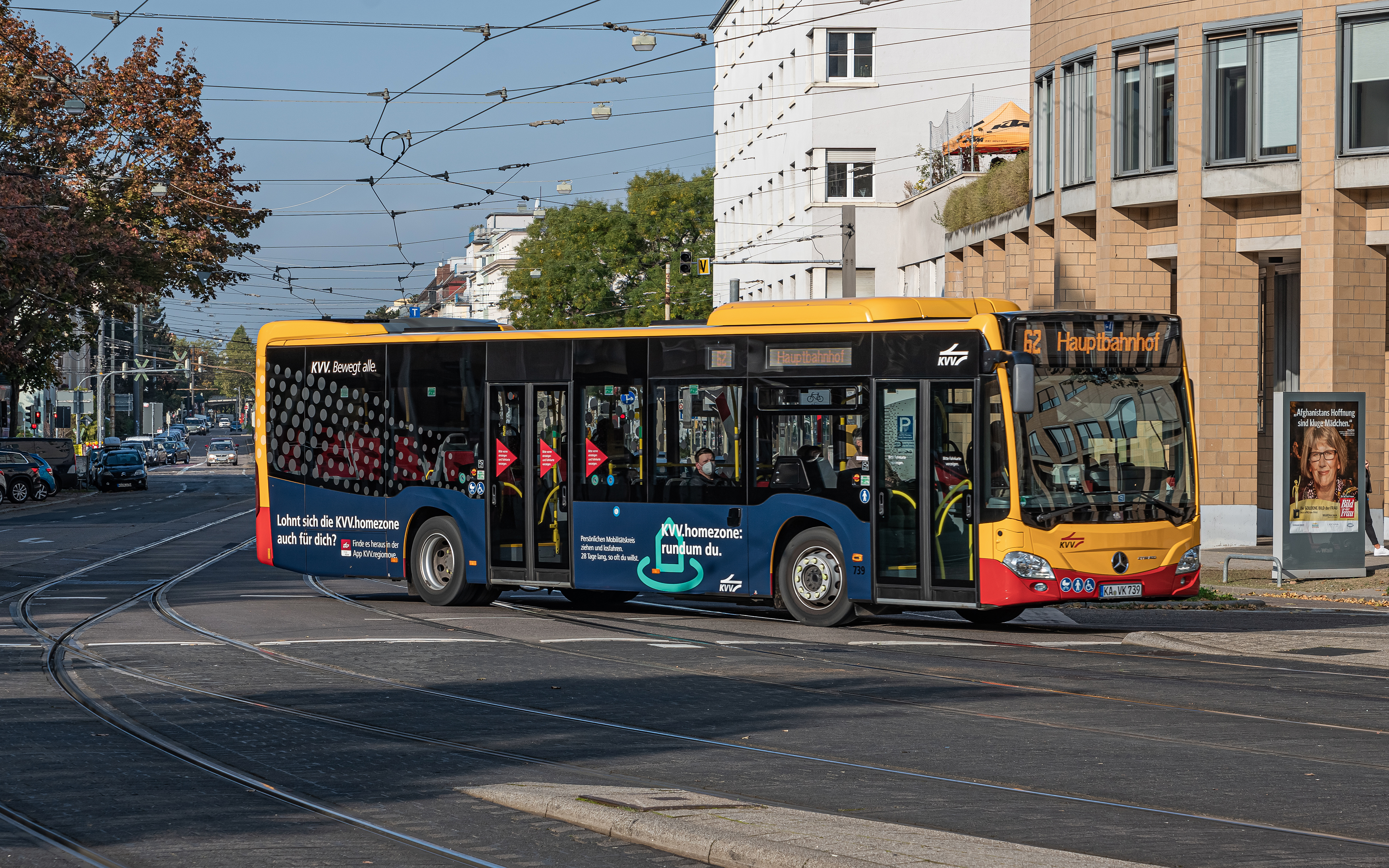
Bus of Verkehrsbetriebe Karlsruhe

The Verkehrsbetriebe Karlsruhe (Karlsruhe Transport Company, VBK) is the municipal transport company of the city of Karlsruhe in Germany. It runs the tram and bus network within the city, as well as the Turmbergbahn funicular railway.

The VBK is a member of the Karlsruher Verkehrsverbund (Karlsruhe Transport Association, KVV) that manages a common public transport structure for Karlsruhe and its surrounding areas. The VBK is also a partner, with the Albtal-Verkehrs-Gesellschaft (Alb Valley Transport Company, AVG) and Deutsche Bahn (DB), in the operation of the Karlsruhe tramway network, and the Karlsruhe Stadtbahn, the pioneering tram-train system that serves a larger area around the city.

== Buses ==
Verkehrsbetriebe Karlsruhe and its predecessor have operated bus services since 1911, some with their own vehicles and some operated by subcontractors. The first bus line opened between Mühlburg and Daxlanden on 30 December 1911 and operated for only three months due to large losses. In 1926, another bus service was established to Rüppurr and it continued until 1931. In 1928, the first bus line that still exists today was opened, connecting to the Weiherfeld district. Other bus routes were established over the decades to complement the tram network. Today the bus network has 23 lines and they are organised as feeder services to the tram and Stadtbahn networks.
