= Standardisierte Bewertung =

Standardisierte Bewertung is an evaluation scheme to determine cost-benefit ratios of public transport projects in Germany. The process is part of a legal process to obtain federal funds (up to 85%) within the GVFG Law.

== Background ==
Standardisierte Bewertung is based on the work of the traffic scientist Gerhard Heimerl in Stuttgart and the Munich based Intraplan Consult start of the 80s. Updates have been published in 2000, 2006, and 2016, inter alia.

== Goals ==
The evaluation is based on a comparison of a "With" and "Without" solution, so the effect of a continuation of the existing network will be compared to the effects of the planned project. The result of the Standardisierte Bewertung shall include most quantitatively measurable external effects, also for society and environment, of a planned project. The evaluation scheme tries to deliver a comparable evaluation of different projects to allow a just distribution of public funding.

== Process ==
Several steps are taken. First any project effect will scrutinized whether a measurable (cardinal) effect is to be found or not. The non-measurable effects will be summarized in an appendix. Measurable effects are categorized as:

- measured in financial units
- transferable into monetary units via established processes (e.g. travel time reduction, pollution)
- not monetisable

The cost-benefit indicator of the monetisable components is the decisive factor for the GVFG funding. It is a simple number showing the cost / effect ratio. Funding will only be given for projects with a ratio bigger than 1. The process has started as a private consultancy scheme and was rather quickly established as part of the legal process. However the Standardisierte Bewertung assessment is ordered from private companies and consultants as further example and gained international acknowledgement, e.g. to obtain Transport and Works Act Order Applications and state funding in the UK.

== Trivia ==
- For the Metrorapid and Munich Transrapid projects a Standardisierte Bewertung value of about 1.5 has been elaborated. However this was executed with a modified process which included enhanced German export successes, less traffic jams and enhanced international relationships. Based on the standard procedure for railway projects, the result would have been around 0.8 (not sufficient for funding). The critical assessment of the Bundesrechnungshof was not accepted by the Bundesverkehrsministerium.
- A use of an adapted scheme for a Tram-train project in Bristol is mentioned in
- In Karlsruhe, dubbed the Mecca of Tram-train (with values of 2.5 for several projects) "Standi" as short term for Standardisierte Bewertung is as a household term explained in the local Stadtwiki (in German)
