= Alb Valley Railway =

Railway line in Germany

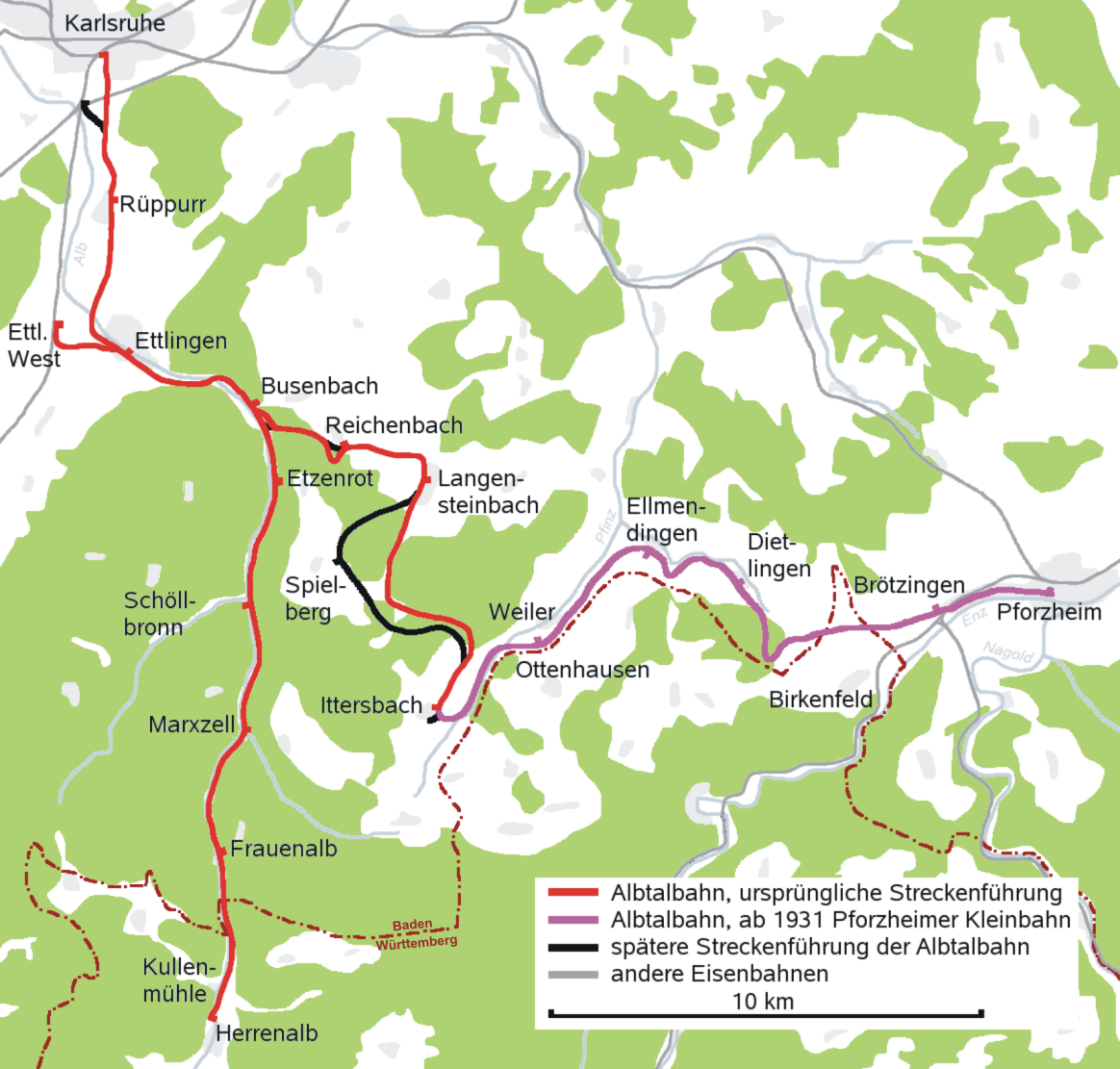

Overview
- Native name: Albtalbahn
- Line number: 9420
- Locale: Baden-Württemberg, Germany

Service
- Route number: 710.1

Technical
- Line length: 41.5 km (25.8 mi)
- Track gauge: 1,435 mm (4 ft 8 1/2 in) standard gauge
- Old gauge: 1,000 mm (3 ft 3 3/8 in) metre gauge
- Minimum radius: 25 m (82 ft)
- Electrification: 750 V DC overhead
- Operating speed: 80 km/h (50 mph) (max)
- Maximum incline: 2.5%

The Alb Valley Railway (German: Albtalbahn, pronounced [ˈalptaːlˌbaːn] ) is a railway line in southern Germany that runs from Karlsruhe via Ettlingen to Bad Herrenalb with a branch to Ittersbach. The line is owned and operated, as part of the Stadtbahn Karlsruhe, by the Albtal-Verkehrs-Gesellschaft (AVG).

== History ==
=== The Ettlingen branch line ===
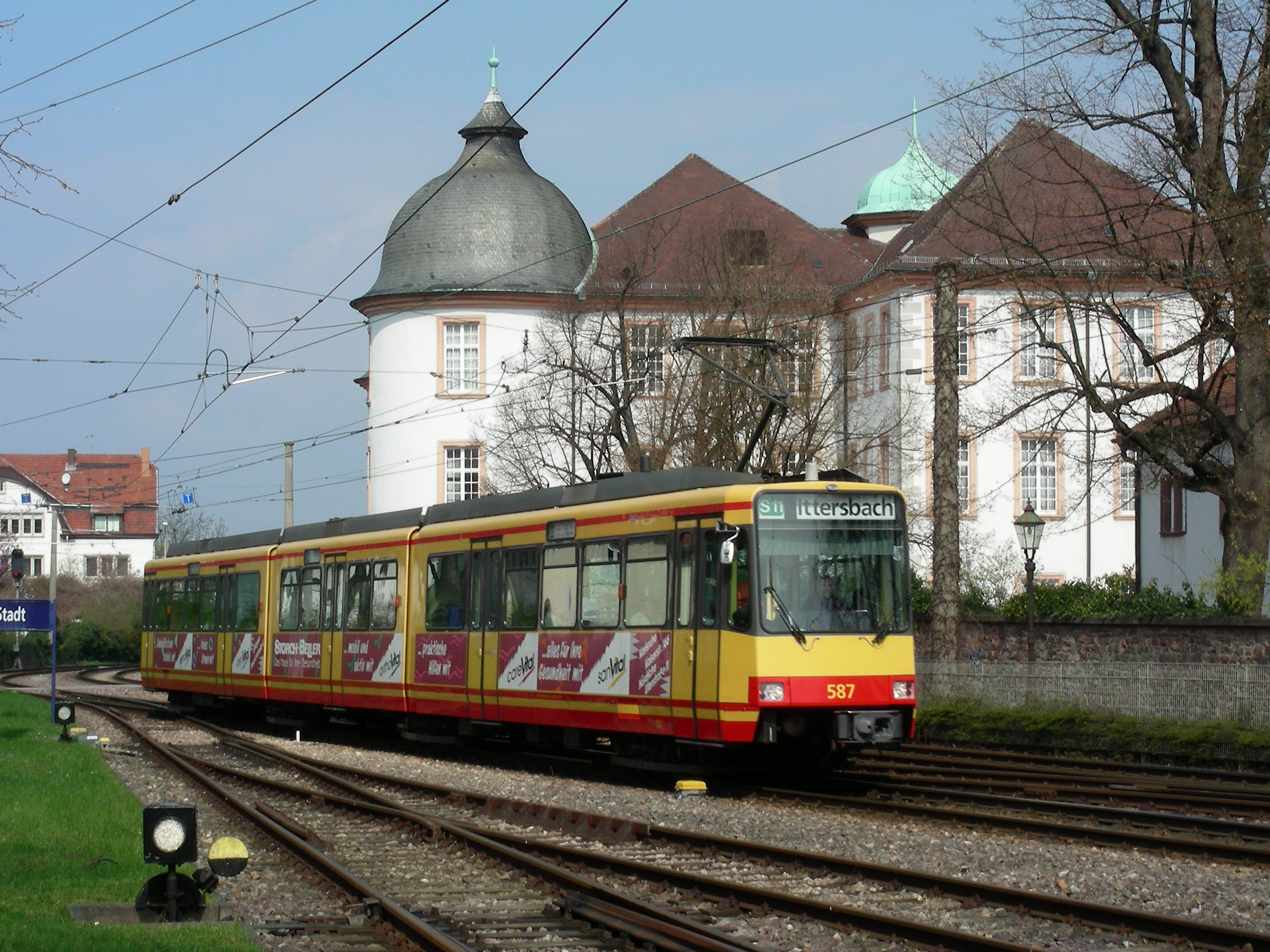
A train of the Alb Valley Railway passes Ettlingen palace. This section has been served since 1887

The town of Ettlingen had gained a rail connection in 1844 with the opening of the current Ettlingen West station on the Baden Mainline, but the station was far from the town and could not satisfy the needs of its population and industries. Therefore, the town pressed for a short branch line to the centre of the town. Since the Grand Duchy of Baden State Railways was not interested in the construction of the line, the town of Ettlingen requested a permit to build the line itself.

On 25 August 1885, the first section of the standard gauge line was opened from Ettlingen West station to Erbprinz and this was followed on 15 July 1887 by the opening of the remaining section to the current Ettlingen Stadt station. The management of this line was transferred to the Grand Duchy of Baden State Railways, which began operating 17 daily passenger trains in each direction. The timetable included both shuttle trains running to Ettlingen West station and through trains running from Ettlingen to Karlsruhe.

In addition to connecting Ettlingen to the railway network, the line served the growing commuter traffic between Karlsruhe and Ettlingen. An expansion of services between two cities, however, was not possible because of the limited capacity of the main line between Karlsruhe and Ettlingen West, so the construction of a direct rail link to Rüppurr was soon discussed.

=== Construction of Alb Valley Railway ===
As early as 1870, planning had begun for a railway from Karlsruhe via Ettlingen and the northern Black Forest to Herrenalb. At the time the valley was a popular destination of the Karlsruhe population; in addition the developing industrial enterprises in Ettlingen and Karlsruhe were an important source of income for the population of the surrounding villages, which meant many workers had to take long walks each day to their work places. The once-daily stagecoach service was no longer sufficient.

Ettlingen initially resisted the project because it feared that the construction of a direct rail connection would lead to Karlsruhe annexing Ettlingen. This risk was not seen as so great if the proposed line was built as a narrow gauge railway. After obtaining a licence to build the railway from the governments of Baden (1896) and Württemberg (1897), construction could begin. The Alb Valley Railway crossed into the state of Württemberg region In Herrenalb, but—in contrast to the nearby Murg Valley Railway (Murgtalbahn)—this caused no major difficulties for the construction and operation of the line.

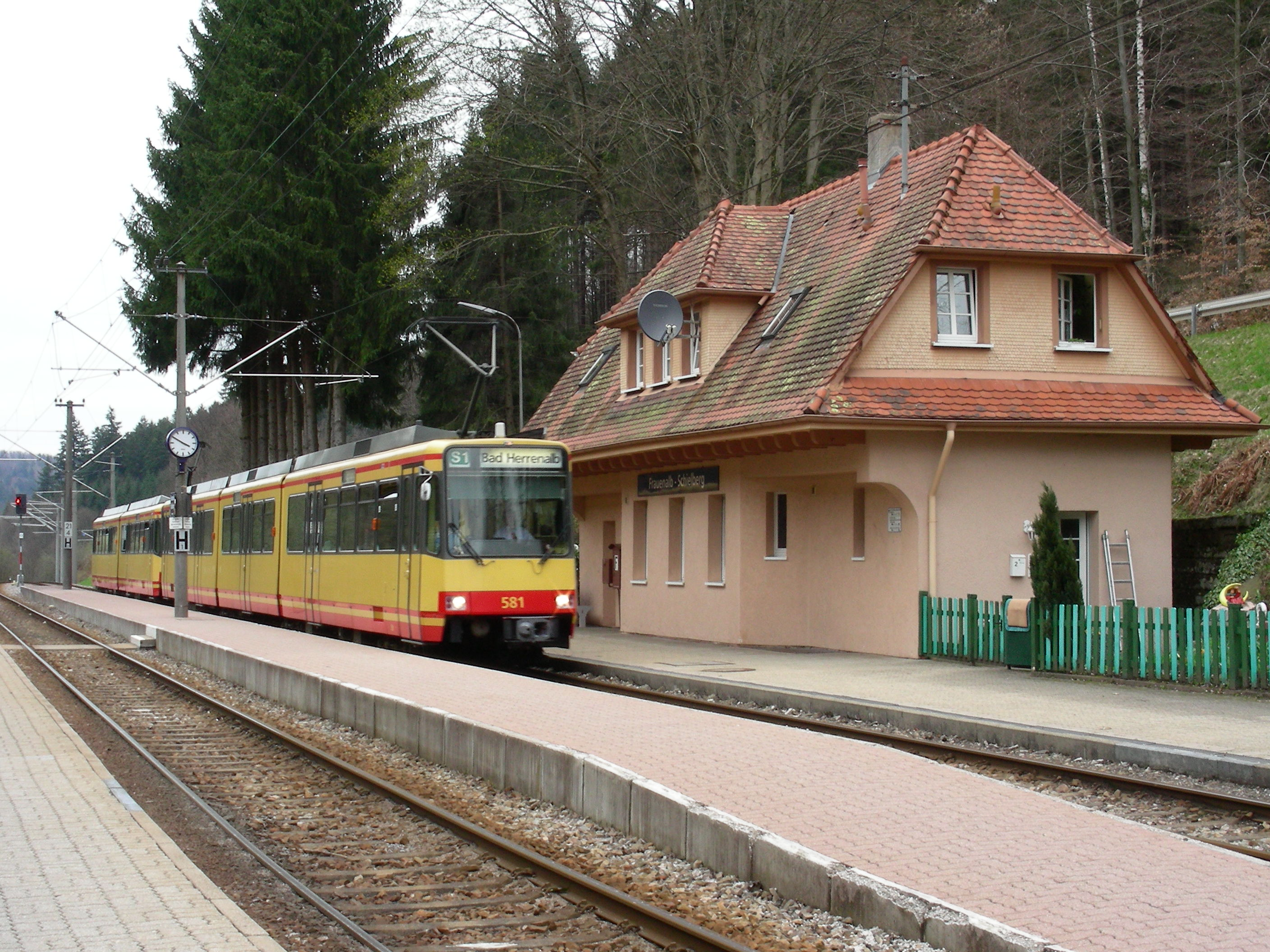
Frauenalb-Schielberg station in 2006. The station building dates from the early years of the line

The first section between Karlsruhe and Ettlingen was opened on 1 December 1897, the Ettlingen–Frauenalb section followed on 14 May 1898 and the Frauenalb–Herrenalb section on 2 July 1898. A branch line to Ittersbach was opened on 10 April 1899, making Busenbach a rail junction.

The Ettlingen West–Ettlingen Stadt line was built as a dual gauge line and services were integrated into the Alb Valley Railway. The dual gauge track was extended to Busenbach in 1899 and to Etzenrot in 1906 to improve access for freight traffic. In 1898, the Alb Valley Railway was taken over by the Badische Lokal-Eisenbahnen Aktiengesellschaft (Baden Local Railway Company, BLEAG), a newly formed subsidiary of the Westdeutsche Eisenbahn-Gesellschaft (West German Railway Company, WeEG).

=== Development of the metre-gauge Alb Valley Railway ===
In order to remove the smoke produced by the steam locomotives of the Alb Valley Railway from the streets of Karlsruhe, the Karlsruhe-Ettlingen section was electrified at 550 volts direct current in 1898 and a service with electric multiple units was added. The trains to Herrenalb now operated to Ettlingen using electric powered and south of Ettlingen they were steam hauled. A coal-fired power station was built in Seehof between Rüppurr and Ettlingen to supply power for the line.

Since electrical operations on the line were well-proven, an extension of electrification was considered for the whole Alb Valley Railway, but with high-voltage alternating current preferred because of the greater distance. Therefore, after 1910 DC-based operations were abandoned and AC-based operations commenced in 1911 on the whole line. While the system used was single-phase AC at 8,000 volts 25 Hz (later increased to 8,800 volts), trains could only run at 650 volts DC in the city of Karlsruhe until 1936. The power station at Seehof was converted so that it could supply the AC power.

Routes of Alb Valley Railway within Karlsruhe in the early years

During the construction of the Karlsruhe Central Station (Hauptbahnhof) between 1910 and 1915 the northern terminus of the Alb Valley Railway had to be moved three times within Karlsruhe. The station was originally located in Ettlinger Straße near the fairground (Festplatz), but on 26 February 1910, it was moved to Beiertheimer Allee near Hermann-Billing-Straße, allowing Ettlinger Straße to be cleared for the construction of a new tram line. Previously there had been sidings for the Alb Valley Railway at the new location on "old" Klosestraße. From 7 April 1910, the Alb Valley Railway no longer ran to the east of the Stadtgarten (municipal park), but instead ran further to the west between Beiertheimer Avenue and the (new) Bahnhofstraße on the former route of the state railway to Durmersheim (Rhine Railway), now the path of the "new" Klosestraße. After a temporary terminus opened on 19 January 1914 at the northern end of the (new) Bahnhofstraße, from 22 March 1915 the terminus was moved to Ebertstraße, where it is currently still located. Technical problems and a lack of thermal coal forced the BLEAG in 1917 to greatly limit operations with electrical rolling stock, sometimes abandoning the service entirely. Reliable electrical supplies only became available again after the conversion of the power plant into a transformer station and its connection to the newly built Murgwerks hydro-electric power station on the Murg river. So from 1922 electric trains were able to operate again.

Traffic on the Alb Valley Railway increased in the first years of its operation, but after the First World War, the railway faced increasing economic difficulties. The operation could only be maintained with financial support from the district of Karlsruhe, leading to a reduction in services in the timetable. The city of Karlsruhe introduced in the mid-1920s a parallel bus service between Karlsruhe and Rüppurr, reducing the economic viability of the railway.

The BLEAG came under pressure during the Great Depression and went bankrupt. The German Railway Operating Company (Deutsche Eisenbahn-Betriebs-Gesellschaft), DEBG) took over the Alb Valley Railway in 1932 from the bankruptcy estate of the BLEAG. Through modernisation, including the introduction of transporter wagons (Rollwagen), the DEBG succeeded in improving the financial viability of the railway.

Highway construction in the mid-1930s brought some changes to the Alb Valley Railway. This meant that the line between Rüppurr and Ettlingen was moved to the east, so that the road and the highway followed a common route. The simultaneous upgrade of Herrenalber Straße in Rüppurr as a feeder road also required the rebuilding of the line between Dammerstock and Schloss Rüppurr.

In the Second World War the Alb Valley Railway was attacked several times by fighter aircraft, but damage was relatively minor. However, the demolition of the bridge over the Karlsruhe marshalling yard at the end of the war required several months of reconstruction to restore the Alb Valley Railway to the southern bridgehead at Dammerstock.

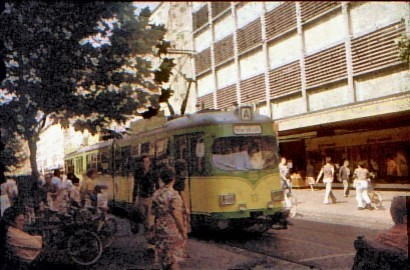
Articulated train of the Alb Valley Railway in inner Karlsruhe (1978)

=== Gauge conversion and linking to the tram network ===
After the Second World War, both line and rolling stock were in a dilapidated condition, requiring comprehensive modernisation. The DEBG, however, had little interest in the continued operation of the railway. In the political debate about the future of Alb Valley Railway, the city of Karlsruhe took the initiative. It was mainly interested in establishing good suburban services between Karlsruhe, Rüppurr and Ettlingen and eliminating the need for passengers to change at Karlsruhe Albtalbahnhof from the Alb Valley Railway to trams. Therefore, it proposed the gauge conversion of the line to standard gauge and linking it to the urban tram network.

With the help of the state of Baden-Württemberg, it founded the Albtal-Verkehrs-Gesellschaft (Alb Valley Transport Company, AVG) on 1 April 1957, which took over the Alb Valley Railway from the DEBG and immediately began renovating it. This work included the change of the electrification equipment to 750 volts DC. The first section from Albtalbahnhof to Rüppurr was opened on 18 April 1958. From then on the electric multiple units of the Alb Valley Railway continued from the Albtalbahnhof to the centre of Karlsruhe, so that most passengers did not have to change trains.

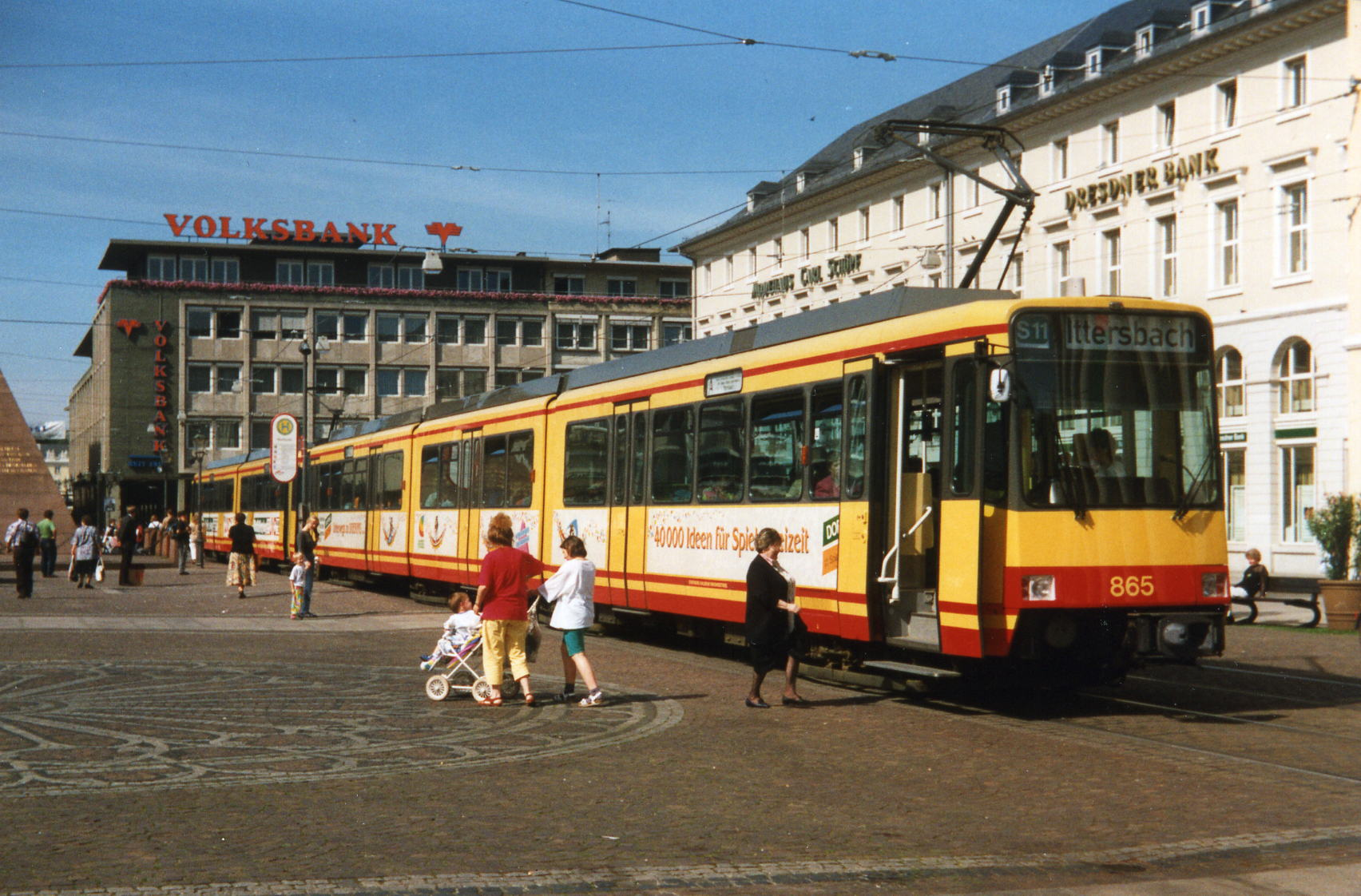
Alb Valley Railway train in Karlsruhe Marktplatz (1994)

Additional sections were opened to Ettlingen on 15 May 1959, to Busenbach on 15 April 1960, to Etzenrot on 12 May to 1960, to Marxzell on 12 December 1960 and to Herrenalb on 1 September 1961.

Even after the gauge conversion of the line between 1957 and 1975, the line continued to be modernised, including the building of a signalling centre in Ettlingen (1967), the realignment of the Albtalbahnhof–Dammerstock section (1977) and the Rüppurr–Ettlingen Neuwiesenreben section [1988), the upgrading of the track to allow a top speed of 80 km/h (until 1983) and the duplication of track between Ettlingen and Busenbach (1989–1990). Track improvements were also carried out in Steinhäusle in order to create a request stop, which was composed only of a platform next to a level crossing and was paid for by nearby residents.

The various upgrades allowed passenger services on the line to be continuously improved. Services on the metre gauge Alb Valley Railway between Karlsruhe and Herrenalb had a running time of about 70 minutes. By 1979 running time had been reduced 46 minutes and currently running time is 35 minutes with a more frequent service than in the past.

Whilst the connection to the city tram network physically permitted trams to run on the line, the Albtalbahn remained legally a railway, and needed to conform to mainline railway design and safety standards. The experience Karlsruhe accumulated in operating across the divide between tramway and railway eventually led to further developments in which specially designed vehicles were able to run on both mainline railways and the city's tram system. In doing so, the Albtalbahn became the first element in the Stadtbahn Karlsruhe, which has subsequently become a model for using tram-train techniques for linking regional railway routes to municipal tram systems in other European cities.

== Operations ==
=== Route ===
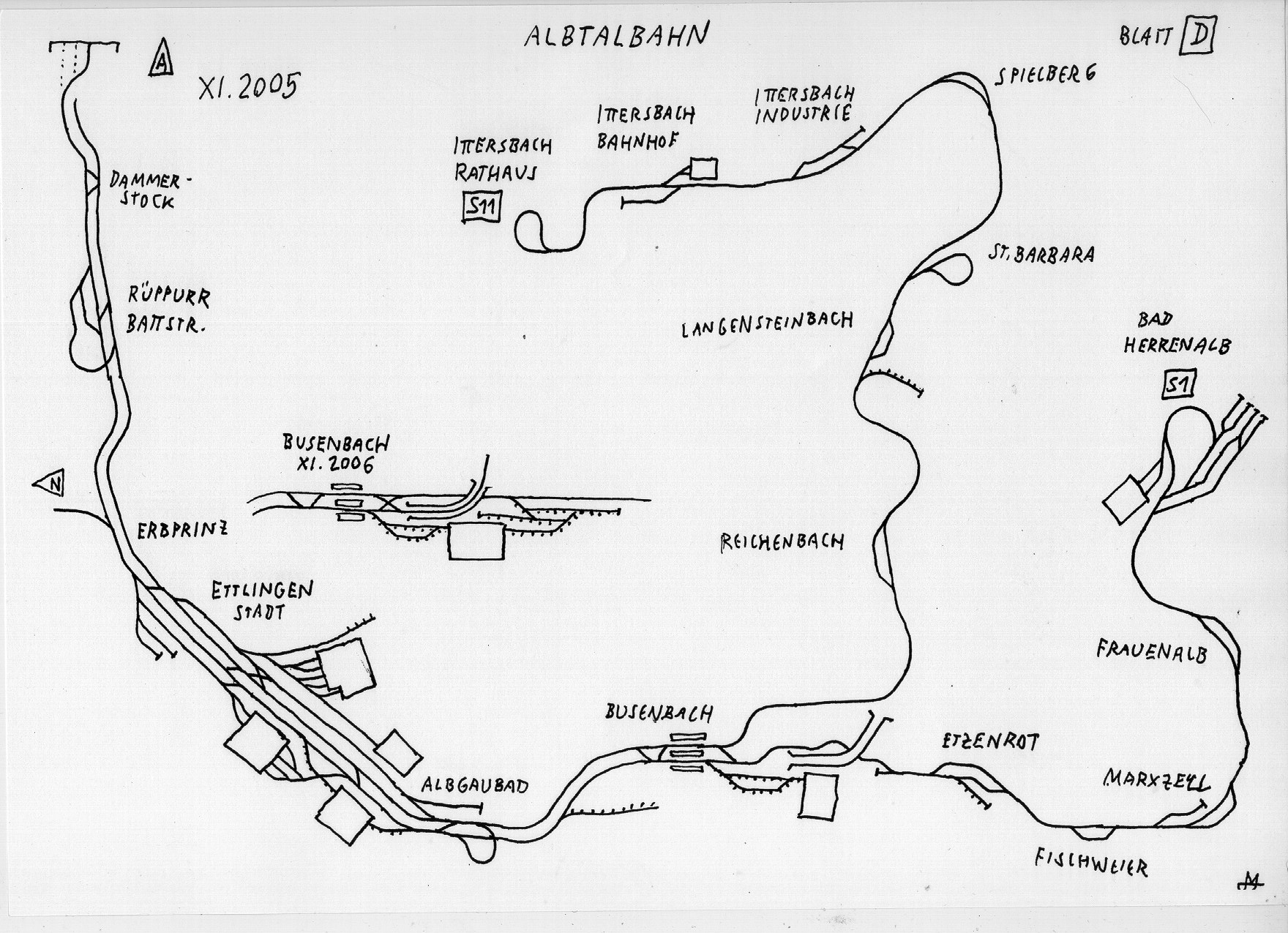
Track plan of the line (not to scale) as of 2006

The northern terminus of the Alb Valley Railway proper is at the Karlsruhe Albtalbahnhof (Alb Valley station), situated some 200 m (660 ft) to the west of Karlsruhe Hauptbahnhof, the principal railway station of the city of Karlsruhe. However tram-trains running on the Alb Valley Railway continue north of the Albtalbahnhof to join the city tram tracks of the Verkehrsbetriebe Karlsruhe.

South of the Albtalbahnhof the Alb Valley Railway passes under the mainline approach to the Hauptbahnhof, and over the adjacent freight railway. For the first 10 km (6.2 mi), as far as Busenbach, the line is double track and serves 11 intermediate stops, several of which serve the town of Ettlingen. Just before Ettlingen Stadt station, a 1.5 km (0.93 mi) long freight-only spur connects the Alb Valley Railway to the mainline railway. To the east of Ettlingen Stadt are the main workshops of the Albtal-Verkehrs-Gesellschaft, and a turning loop for services terminating in Ettlingen.

At Busenbach, the line splits into two branches, each consisting of single track with passing loops. The branch to Ittersbach initially diverges to the west, before crossing the branch to Bad Herrenalb on a flyover. The line to Bad Herrenalb is 15.8 km (9.8 mi) long and passes through five intermediate stops before reaching its terminus. The Ittersbach branch is 14.7 km (9.1 mi) long, and passes through eight intermediate stops before reaching its terminus. Both termini have turning loops.

=== Passenger services ===
The passenger services of the Albtalbahn are provided by routes S1 and S11 of the Karlsruhe Stadtbahn, which are operated by the Albtal-Verkehrs-Gesellschaft (AVG). A typical off-peak service consists of six trains an hour, of which two terminate at Ettlingen, and two each continue to the two branches. More trains may operate during peak periods, and fewer on a Sunday or in the evenings.

The S1 and S11 continue north of the Albtalbahnhof, across city tram tracks operated by the Verkehrsbetriebe Karlsruhe, and then to the north of Karlsruhe on the AVG owned Hardtbahn to Hochstetten.

=== Freight ===
Freight plays only a minor role on the Alb Valley Railway and is limited to a freight forwarding operation in Busenbach and occasional timber loading in Busenbach. It is hauled by AVG diesel locomotives and the freight wagons are taken over by DB Schenker Rail or SBB Cargo in Karlsruhe freight yard.

== Major stations ==
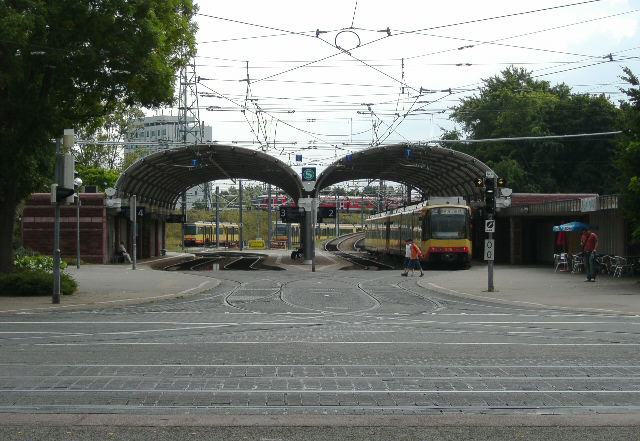
Albtalbahnhof, in front of the system border between trams (front) and railway (behind). The left pair of tracks is used for the Alb Valley Railway and the right pair for Stadtbahn lines S 4/S 41 and S 51

=== Karlsruhe Albtalbahnhof ===
The Albtalbahnhof (Alb Valley station) on Ebertstrasse, which was originally built in 1915, was rebuilt after the gauge conversion with four platform tracks and connected via a triangular junction to the Karlsruhe tram network. A connecting track to Karlstraße allows vehicles to be turned around. The station building was demolished in 1959 and replaced by a low-set building with a ticket office. In 1988, the AVG added a two-span canopy to the station that spans all four tracks.

In 1996, the railway tracks were completely rebuilt during the expansion of the Karlsruhe Stadtbahn network. A connecting track was built to Karlsruhe Hauptbahnhof, which allows services through the Albtalbahnhof to continue on the lines to Durmersheim and to Karlsruhe-West. Since then, trains on the Alb Valley Railway use platform tracks 3 and 4, while Stadtbahn lines S 4, S 41 and S 51 run on tracks 1 and 2. Supplementary carriage sidings were built in 1996 and extended in 2006.

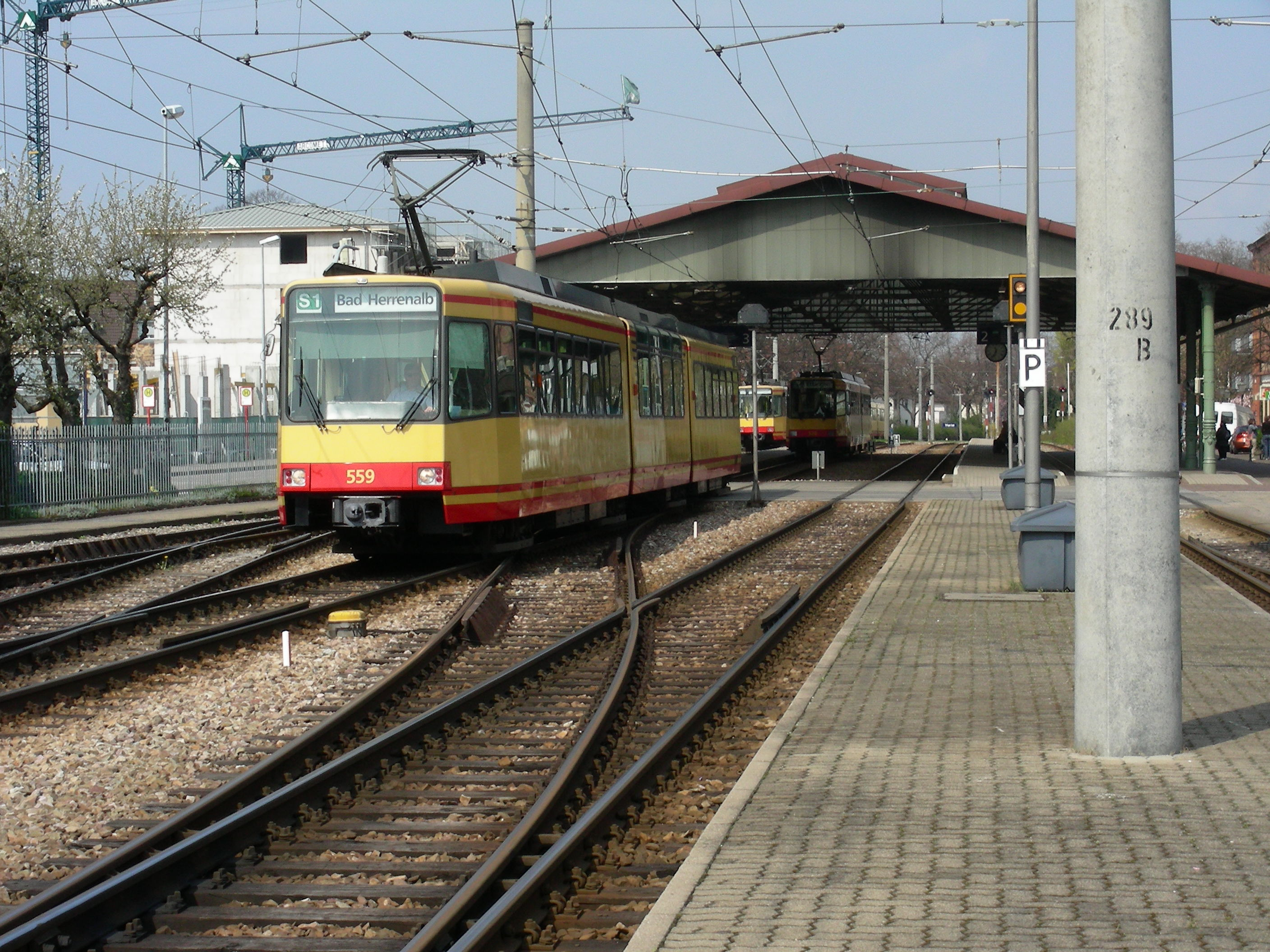
Ettlingen-Stadt station with the station hall that was built in 1986

=== City of Ettlingen ===
The centre of operations on the Alb Valley Railway is around Ettlingen-Stadt station between Erbprinz and Albgaubad stations. A four-track station canopy has existed at Ettlingen-Stadt station since 1986. The station building houses the central signalling centre for the AVG and a ticket office. The station also includes two workshop sheds, a carriage shed and a freight shed. Several sidings and a turning loop at Albgaubad complement the track layout.

=== Busenbach ===
Busenbach station has two platform tracks and to its south the lines to Bad Herrenalb and Ittersbach separate. A platform hall, built as a wood truss in 1990, spans both tracks. The tracks were rebuilt in 2006 and supplemented by a bridge that takes the Ittersbach line over the neighbouring highway, eliminating a very busy level crossing. The main workshop of the AVG, which was built in the early days of the Alb Valley Railway, was west of the line to Herrenalb until 1971. After the construction of the workshop in Ettlingen the old main workshop was closed and replaced by a freight shed.

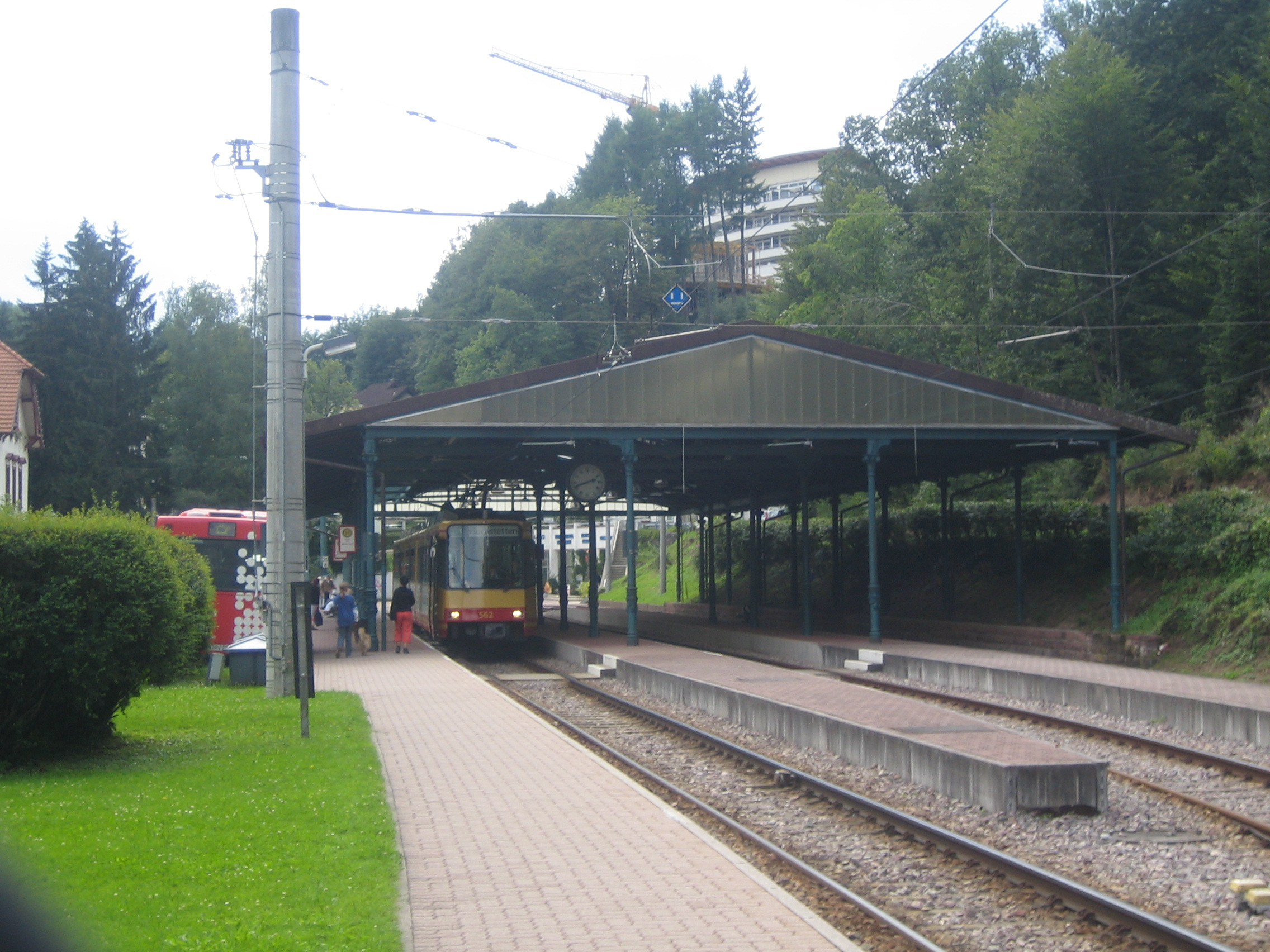
Bad Herrenalb station with the stational hall, which has been built in a historic style

=== Bad Herrenalb ===
Bad Herrenalb station was given an historic appearance the end of the 1970s to match the historic steam train services on the Alb Valley Railway. In addition to the canopy built in 1978 that spans all three tracks, a water crane, a historical, mechanical destination display, a bell and a semaphore signal were installed. Parts of the station have been relocated from the original Baden-Baden station, which was abandoned in 1977. The station building has been restored and houses a restaurant business. A modern rail carriage shed completes the station layout.
