= Eggenstein-Leopoldshafen =

- Municipality
- Flag Coat of arms

- Location of Eggenstein-Leopoldshafen within Karlsruhe district
- Interactive map of Eggenstein-Leopoldshafen
- Location within Germany Location within Baden-Württemberg
- Coordinates: 49°04′40″N 08°23′33″E
- Country: Germany
- State: Baden-Württemberg
- Admin. region: Karlsruhe
- District: Karlsruhe

Government
  - Mayor (2023–31): Lukas Lang

Area
  - Total: 26.09 km^{2} (10.07 sq mi)
- Elevation: 100 m (330 ft)

Population (2025-12-31)
  - Total: 16,850
  - Density: 645.8/km^{2} (1,673/sq mi)
- Time zone: UTC+01:00 (CET)
  - Summer (DST): UTC+02:00 (CEST)
- Postal codes: 76344
- Dialling codes: 0721 und 07247
- Vehicle registration: KA
- Website: www.egg-leo.de

Eggenstein-Leopoldshafen is a municipality of almost 17,000 inhabitants located in the federal state of Baden-Württemberg in the Federal Republic of Germany. It lies about 12 km north of Karlsruhe and is the site of the northern campus of the research centre Karlsruhe Institute of Technology (with the former Forschungsreaktor 2 (FR2). In the west, Eggenstein-Leopoldshafen borders on the Rhine River and in the east it is connected with the Bundesstraße 36.

The two villages that make up the incorporated municipality evolved from medieval villages specializing in freshwater fishing and farming. Today, gravel extraction for construction purposes is important to the local economy, as is the cultivation of white asparagus (Spargel). Because of its location in the Rhine valley, hot humid summers are the norm for Eggenstein-Leopoldshafen. Numerous public beaches exist on the shores of artificial lakes that have been formed by extensive gravel extraction. Eggenstein-Leopoldshafen has numerous active community associations and sports clubs such as most notably TG Eggenstein 1894 e.V.. Eggenstein-Leopoldshafen is also home to the Sportpark Fassbender, a noted tennis school and training facility.

== Economy and Infrastructure ==
The most important economic factor for Eggenstein-Leopoldshafen is the Karlsruhe Institute of Technology (KIT), which was formerly founded there in 1956 under the name Kernforschungszentrum Karlsruhe. This is why the municipality is currently the most important destination for commuters for people living in the nearby city of Karlsruhe. In addition, the municipality has had a balanced municipal budget for years and remains one of the region's plenty debt-free communities. Eggenstein-Leopoldshafen as part of Karlsruhe (district) has one of the lowest unemployment rates in all of Baden-Württemberg with an unemployment rate of approximately around 2.6%.

An automobile and pedestrian ferry crossing across the Rhine River runs from Leopoldshafen to Leimersheim. The town is served by routes S1 and S11 of the Karlsruhe Stadtbahn, which is operated by the Albtal-Verkehrs-Gesellschaft over the Hardtbahn. Seven stops are served, at Eggenstein Süd, Eggenstein Station, Eggenstein Spöcker Weg, Eggenstein Schweriner Strasse, Leopoldshafen Viermorgen, Leopoldshafen Leopoldstrasse and Leopoldshafen Frankfurter Strasse.
