= FR2 =

FR2 may refer to:

- Forschungsreaktor 2, the first entirely German-built nuclear research reactor
- Fostex, Field Memory Recorder (FR-2)
- France 2, a French public TV network
- FR2 (Lazio regional railways), a rail network in the Rome area
- FR-2, synthetic resin bonded paper, often used in electronics
- FR2, a Japanese fashion brand owned by Ceno Company
- Frequency Range 2, one of the 5G NR frequency bands
