= Linkenheim-Hochstetten =

- Municipality
- Coat of arms

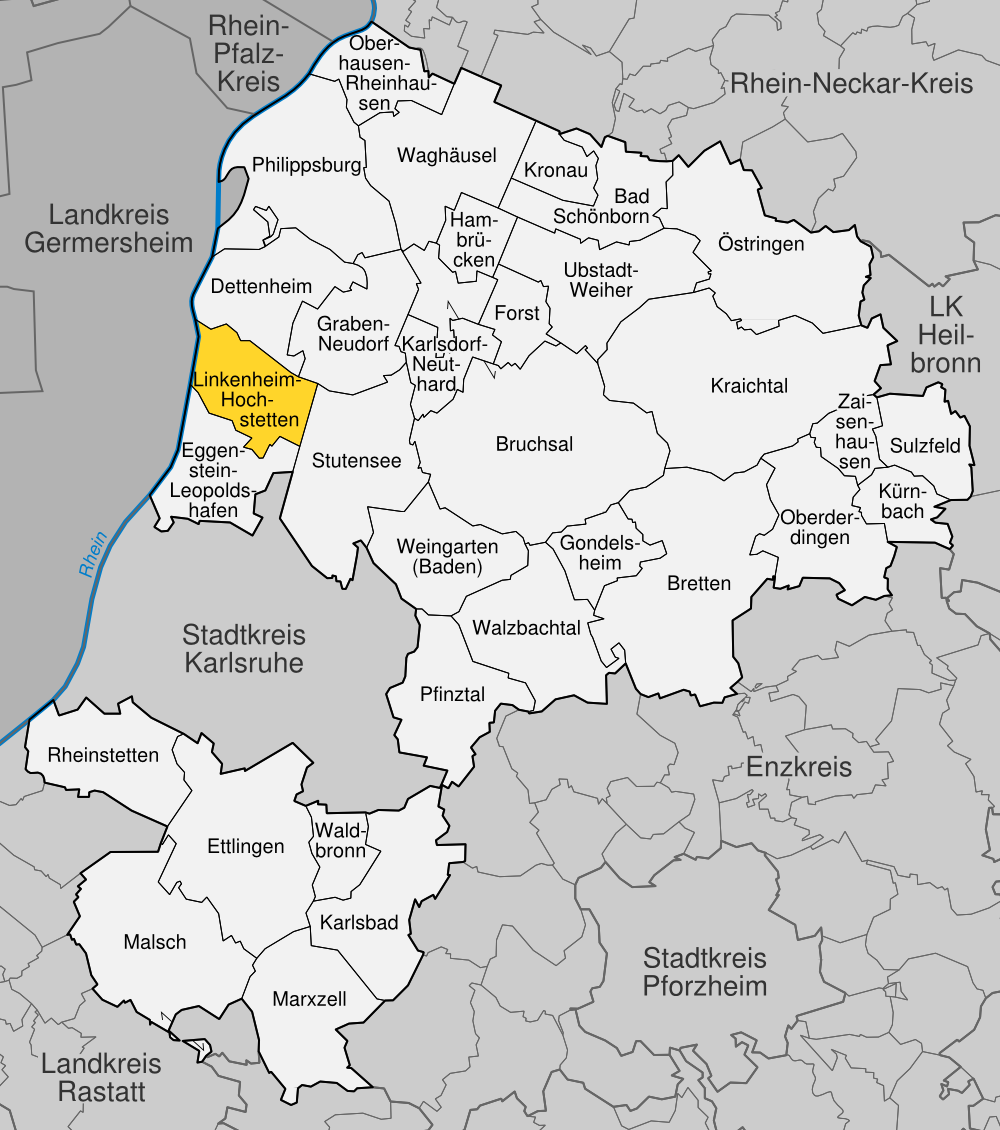
- Location of Linkenheim-Hochstetten within Karlsruhe district
- Interactive map of Linkenheim-Hochstetten
- Location within Germany Location within Baden-Württemberg
- Coordinates: 49°07′34″N 08°24′36″E
- Country: Germany
- State: Baden-Württemberg
- Admin. region: Karlsruhe
- District: Karlsruhe

Government
  - Mayor (2023–31): Michael Möslang

Area
  - Total: 23.60 km^{2} (9.11 sq mi)
- Elevation: 110 m (360 ft)

Population (2025-12-31)
  - Total: 12,601
  - Density: 533.9/km^{2} (1,383/sq mi)
- Time zone: UTC+01:00 (CET)
  - Summer (DST): UTC+02:00 (CEST)
- Postal codes: 76351
- Dialling codes: 07247
- Vehicle registration: KA
- Website: www.linkenheim-hochstetten.de

Linkenheim-Hochstetten (German pronunciation: [ˈlɪŋkŋ̍haɪ̯m ˈhoːxˌʃtɛtn̩]) is a municipality in the district of Karlsruhe, Baden-Württemberg, Germany. It is situated on the right bank of the Rhine, 17 km north of Karlsruhe.

The towns of Linkenheim and Hochstetten merged their municipal governments 1975. The mayor, re-elected on 29 January 2023, is Michael Möslang.

The town is served by routes S1 and S11 of the Karlsruhe Stadtbahn, which is operated by the Albtal-Verkehrs-Gesellschaft over the Hardtbahn. Seven stops are served, at Linkenheim Süd, Linkenheim Friedrichstrasse, Linkenheim Rathaus, Linkenheim Schulzentrum, Hochstetten Grenzstrasse, Hochstetten Altenheim and Hochstetten.

== Demographics ==
Population development:

Year	Inhabitants
1990	9,975
2001	11,690
2011	11,544
2021	12,081
