= Hardt Railway =

Railway line in Germany

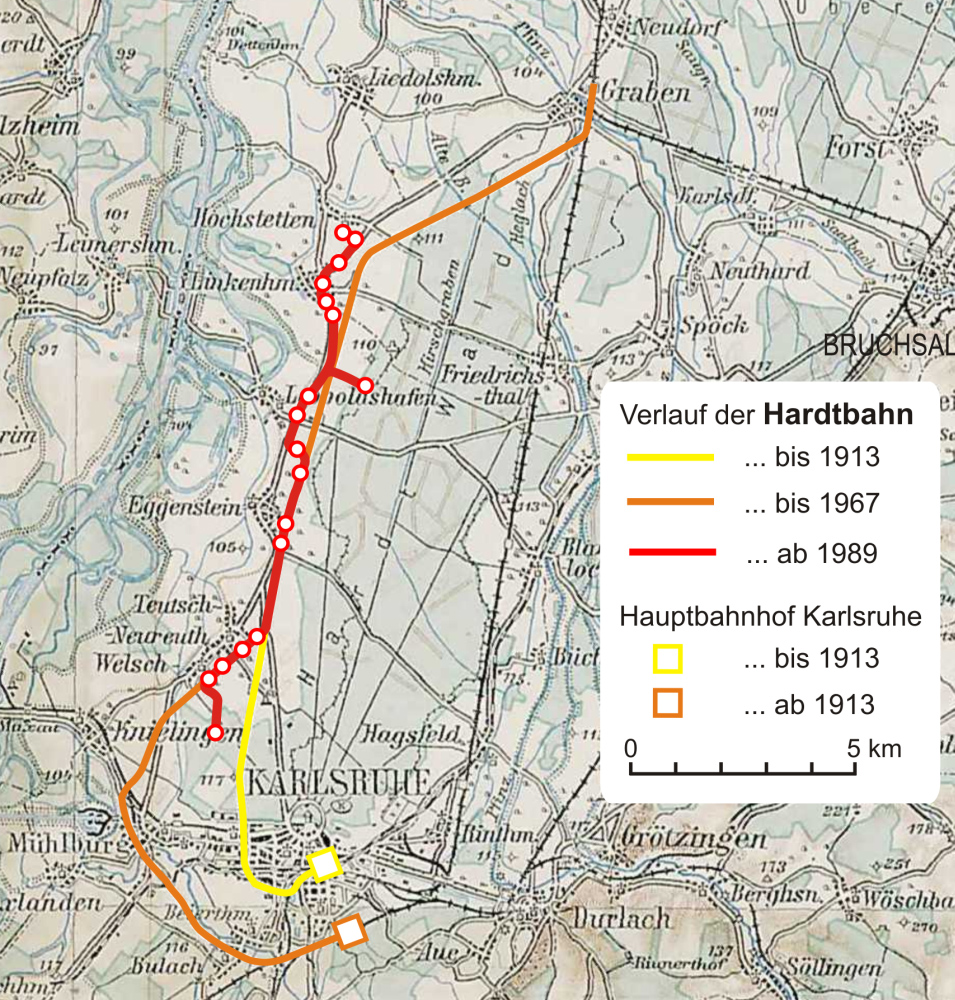
- Historical development of the Hardt Railway

Overview
- Native name: Hardtbahn
- Locale: Baden-Württemberg, Germany

The Hardt Railway (German: Hardtbahn) is a railway line in the Karlsruhe region of Germany. Originally built as part of the Rhine Railway, a through main line, it now forms a branch line from Karlsruhe to Hochstetten. The line runs along the western edge of the forest of Hardtwald, from which it takes its name.

Today the line is owned and operated, as part of the Stadtbahn Karlsruhe, by the Albtal-Verkehrs-Gesellschaft (AVG).

== Route ==
=== Hardt Railway (since 1979) ===
The safe-working system on the line changes from the German tram operating procedures (BOStrab) to rail operating procedures (EBO) north of Haus Bethlehem station. Once the track has returned to street level, it passes across a "bridge to nowhere” over the unfinished Karlsruhe Nordtangente (north tangent) highway. It then runs through an S-curve on to the route of the old Hardt line and follows it to Eggenstein. Shortly after it crosses the Pfinz flood relief canal (Pfinz-Entlastungskanal) it leaves the route of the Hardt line to run further west through the centre of Leopoldshafen. Between Leopolshafen and Linkenheim it comes within a few metres of the old route, but it then runs to the west of the Hardt line through the centre of Linkenheim to terminate in the housing estate of Langer Berg in Hochstetten.

=== Historic Hardt Railway (to 1967/1979) ===
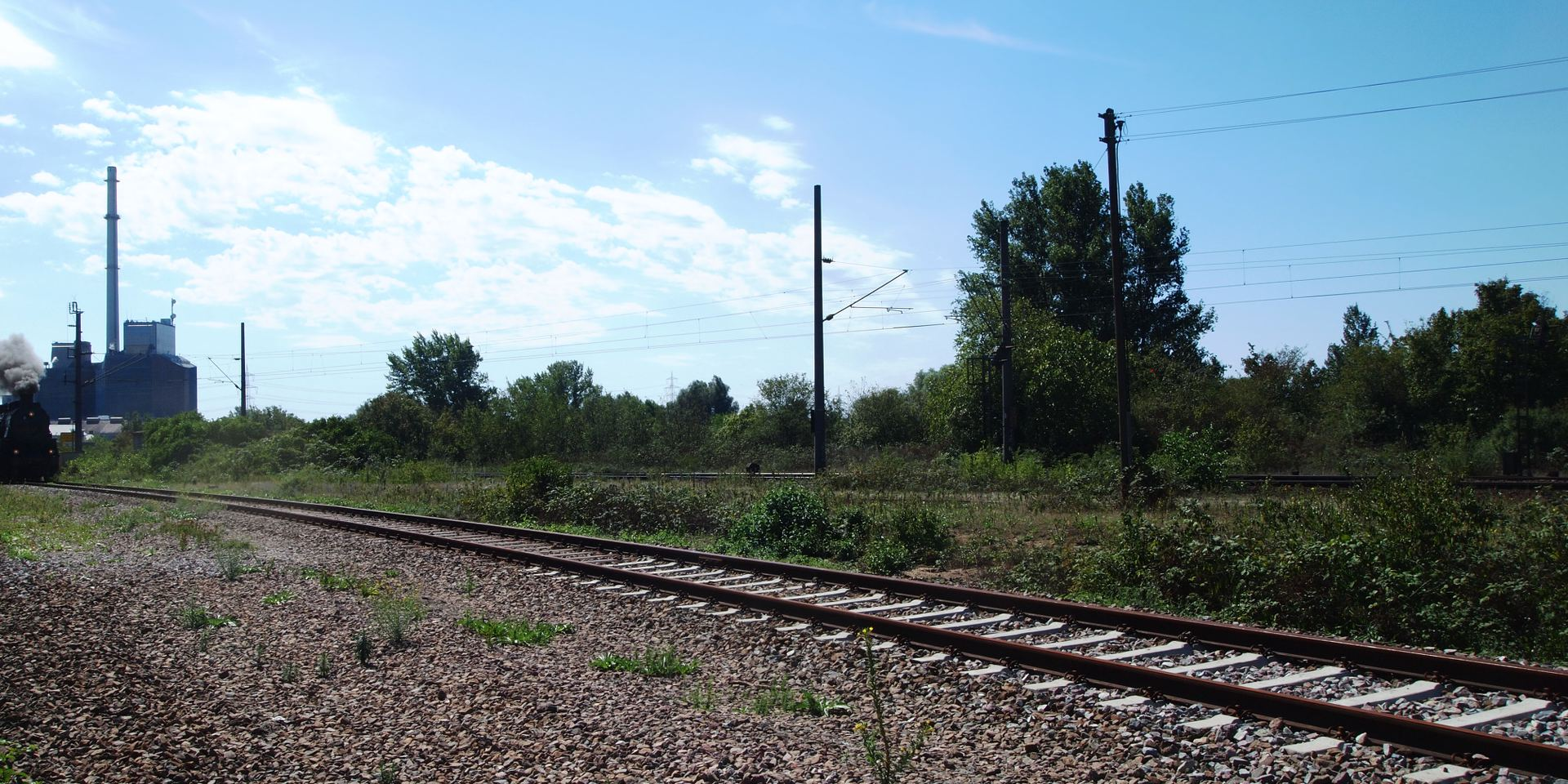
A steam train on the old Hardt railway in 2015

Following the opening of the new Karlsruhe Central Station (Hauptbahnhof) in 1913, the old Hardt Railway followed the tracks of the Palatine Maximilian Railway to Mühlburg. One kilometre after Mühlburg station, the old Hardt Railway separates from the two tracks of the Palatine Maximilian Railway and turns to the right. It then runs directly through the industrial area of Knielingen and then crosses highway B 36. Just prior to Neureut it connects with the new Stadtbahn line and the old and new lines run on the same tracks to Eggenstein. The old Hardt Railway is damantled from Leopoldshafen, but the railway tracks can still easily be recognised on the outskirts of Leopoldshafen. In Linkenheim the route is now built over north of Bahnhofstraße. After that, the line ran on the far eastern edge of Hochstetten to pass through the Hardt forest, where the route can be made out again for a few kilometres to Graben-Neudorf station.

Until 1913, the old Hardt Railway ran from the old Karlsruhe station (in the city centre at Ettlinger Tor) together with the Maxau Railway (Maxaubahn) as far as Mühlburger Tor station in a long, semi-circular curve and then separated from the Maxau Railway to continue to run north along the current Erzbergerstraße to Karlsruher Nordstadt, which was then in the middle of the Hardt forest. It then ran to the north for a few kilometres through an area that was undeveloped at the time, but which is now the location of the Neureut districts of Heide and Kirchfeldsiedlung, which were developed after the Second World War, to reach Neureut where it reached the route of the line opened in 1913.

== History ==
Stations prior to the construction of the Karlsruhe Hauptbahnhof in 1913 overlaid with current tramways
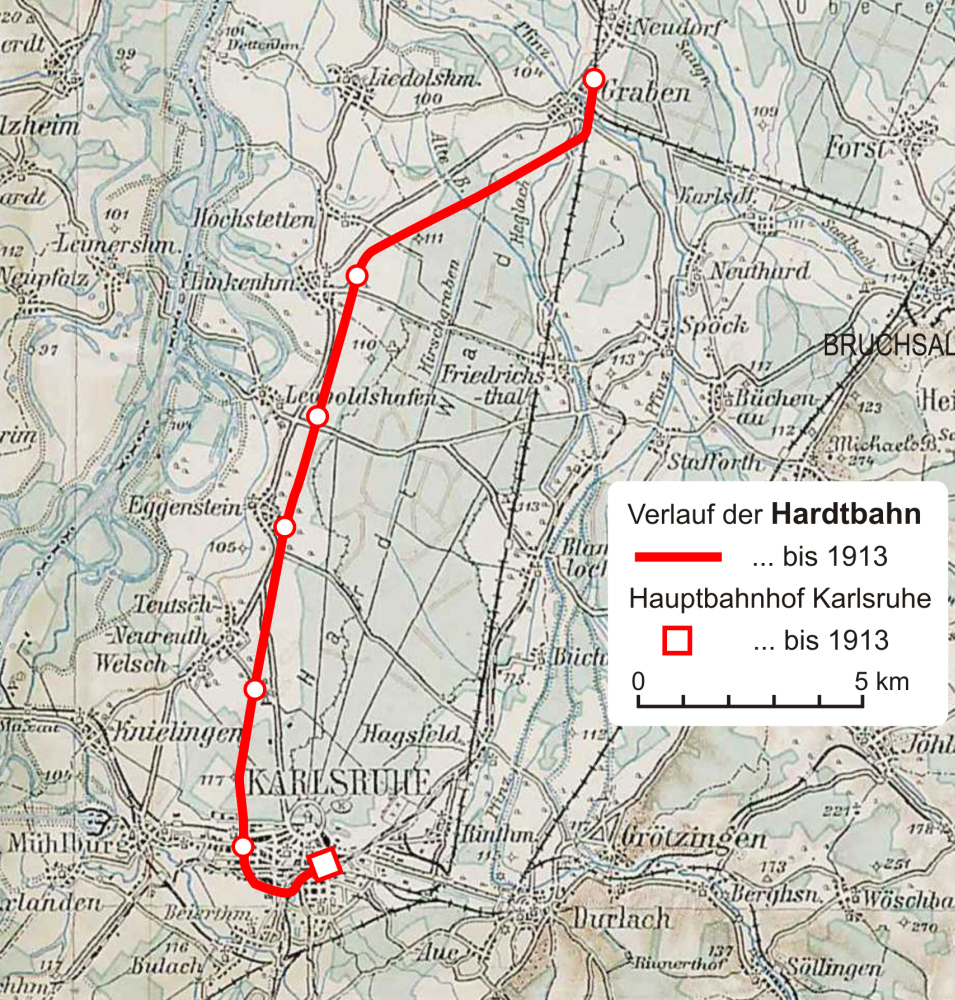
- Route of the Hardt Railway until 1913

Stations after the relocation of the Karlsruhe Hauptbahnhof in 1913.
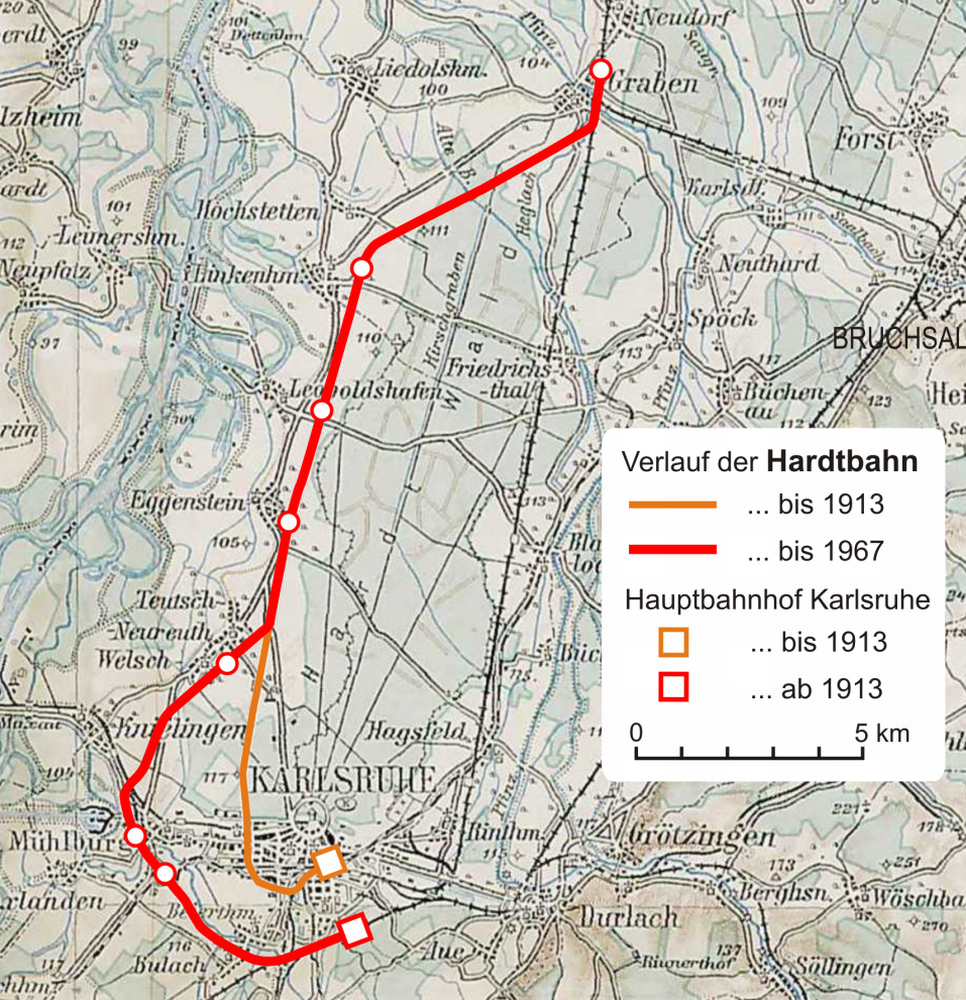
- Route of the Hardt Railway after 1913

=== Opening and first years (1870–1890) ===
Construction of the Baden Mainline (Badische Hauptbahn) started in 1840 from Mannheim, running via Heidelberg to Karlsruhe, and it was extended to Basel by 1855. However, the indirect route via Heidelberg bypassed part of the natural catchment area of Mannheim which was located close to the Rhine, including towns such as Schwetzingen and Hockenheim.

This led to a vigorous debate about the southern part of a proposed line from Mannheim to Karlsruhe close to the Rhine: under the plan, the railway would run via Linkenheim, Eggenstein and Neureut to Mühlburger Tor and from there run together with the Maxau Railway to Karlsruhe station. The Grand Duke of Baden, Frederick I approved the building of this route despite efforts to have the line run to the east of Karlsruhe. It was accepted that through traffic in the north–south direction might not run on the line and that it would instead continue to run on the Heidelberg–Karlsruhe line.

The Mannheim–Schwetzingen–Graben Neudorf–Eggenstein–Karlsruhe line via the Hardt forest was opened on 4 August 1870. It was called the Rhine Railway from the beginning.

=== Further development and decommissioning (1890–1967) ===
As it was expected that there would soon be another war with France, plans were made to build strategic railways. Against this background, the German general staff demanded above all a line on the Graben-Neudorf–Blankenloch–Karlsruhe–Durmersheim–Rastatt–Roeschwoog–Haguenau route, which was inaugurated in 1895. Since the line via Blankenloch was shorter and more direct, trains on the Rhine Railway from then on ran on the strategic line. The Karlsruhe–Eggenstein–Graben-Neudorf section of the line, which was now called the Hardtbahn (Hardt Railway), was no longer used by through trains to Mannheim, instead services on the line ended in Graben-Neudorf.

In 1900, it was decided to relocate Karlsruhe Central Station, which was then in the centre of the city at Ettlinger Tor to the then southern suburbs. This project, which was completed in 1913, involved relocating the route of the Hardt Railway within the city of Karlsruhe and the then independent municipality of Neureut. As a result, the Hart Railway now followed the relocated Maxau Railway (which was, in effect, the Baden section of the Palatine Maximilian Railway) to Mühlburg station and then continued for another kilometre, where it separated from the Maxau Railway to the right and ran straight towards Neureut.

As a result of continuously falling patronage on the Hardt line, last listed in the timetable as line number 302e, since 1950, passenger services were abandoned on 28 May 1967. The line was then dismantled between Graben-Neudorf and the turnoff to the east to the Nuclear Research Centre Karlsruhe (Kernforschungszentrum Karlsruhe, now the North Campus of the Karlsruhe Institute of Technology), which was located in the Hardt forest between Leopoldshafen and Linkenheim. Only the freight to the U.S. barracks in Neureut and to the Research Centre preserved the line from full closure. From 1952 to 1974 there was a siding connecting with the U.S. base at the old airfield on the pre-1913 route of the line.

=== Beginning of Stadtbahn operations (1967–1979) ===
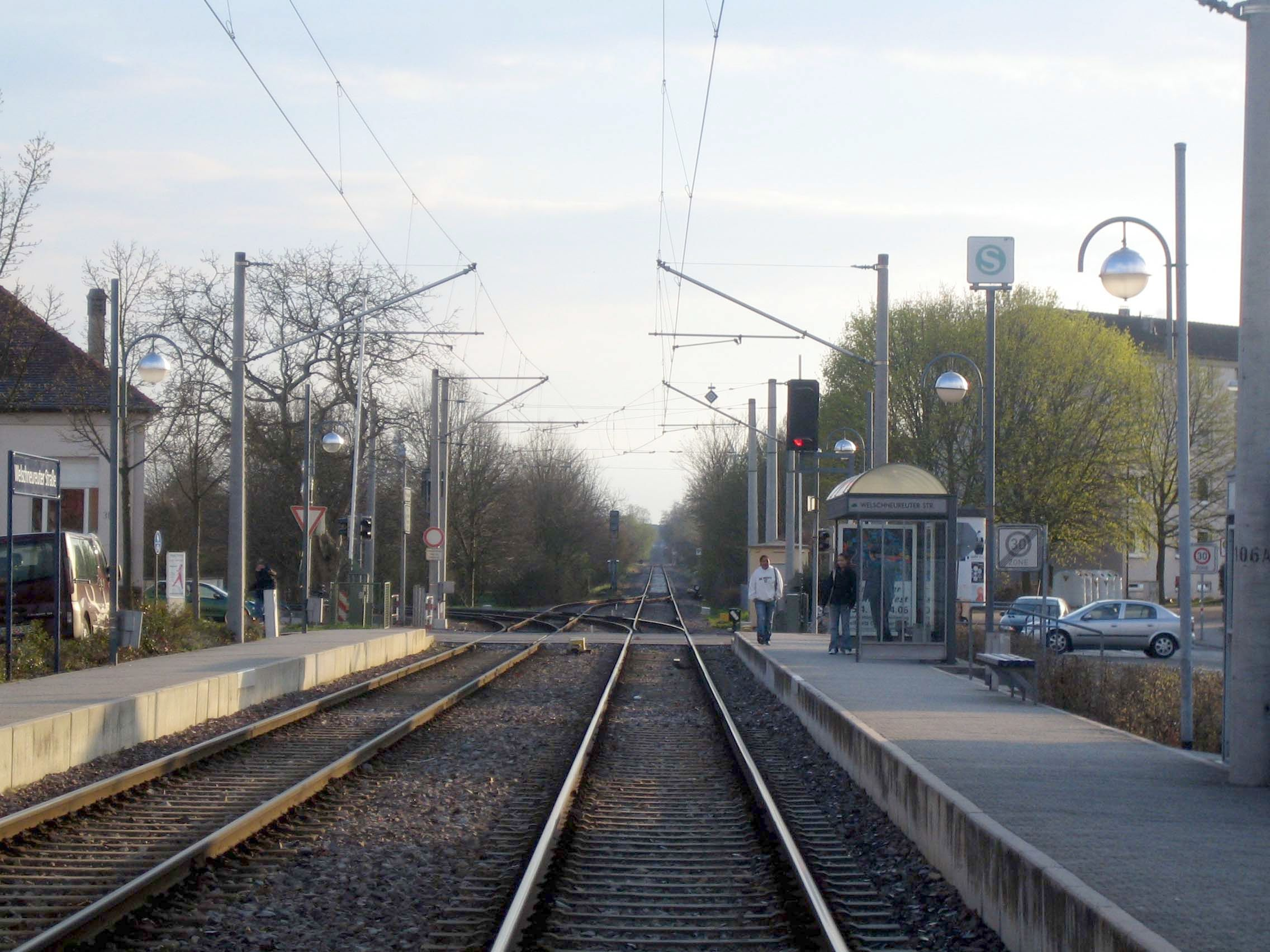
Welschneureuter Str. stop: the "new Hardt Railway" branches to the left towards central Karlsruhe, the old line runs ahead towards Mühlburg

After Neureut was incorporated in Karlsruhe in 1974, it was agreed to connect it to the Karlsruhe tram network. A route had been reserved for this purpose east of the Hardt Railway, running to the Neureut development area.

The possibility of using the Hardt Railway to Neureut for the tram service was considered. From 1978, the AVG extended line A, which started on the Alb Valley Railway (Albtalbahn) or the Busenbach–Ittersbach railway, through Karlsruher Nordweststadt to Neureut.

This was followed by lengthy and difficult negotiations between the AVG and Deutsche Bundesbahn. The originally planned route for a separate tram link has not been built on yet and it can still be seen clearly. On 23 December 1977, an agreement was finally reached between DB and AVG that would allow the AVG and DB freight to share use of the line in Neureut. An AVG multiple unit ran over the line to prove that operations were possible. Work then began.

The redesigned section was opened to Neureut on 5 August 1979. A service ran as line A on the tracks of the Hardt Railway from Welschneureuter Straße station to the temporary terminus at Neureut Kirchfeld. The first trains ran at twenty-minute intervals to Neureut. This extension of an inner city tram route on a former DB route was one of the steps in the development of the Karlsruhe model.

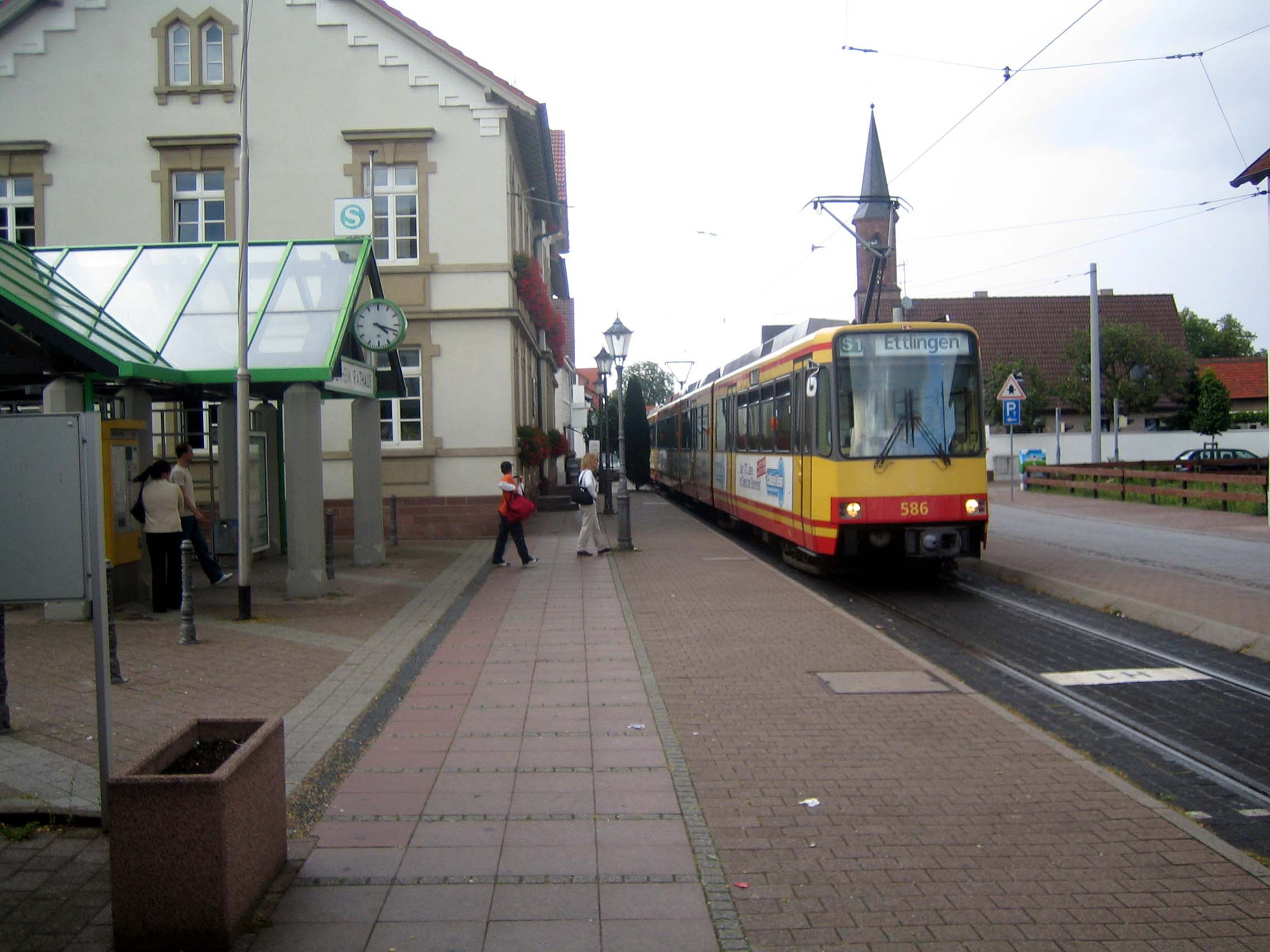
Linkenheim Rathaus stop

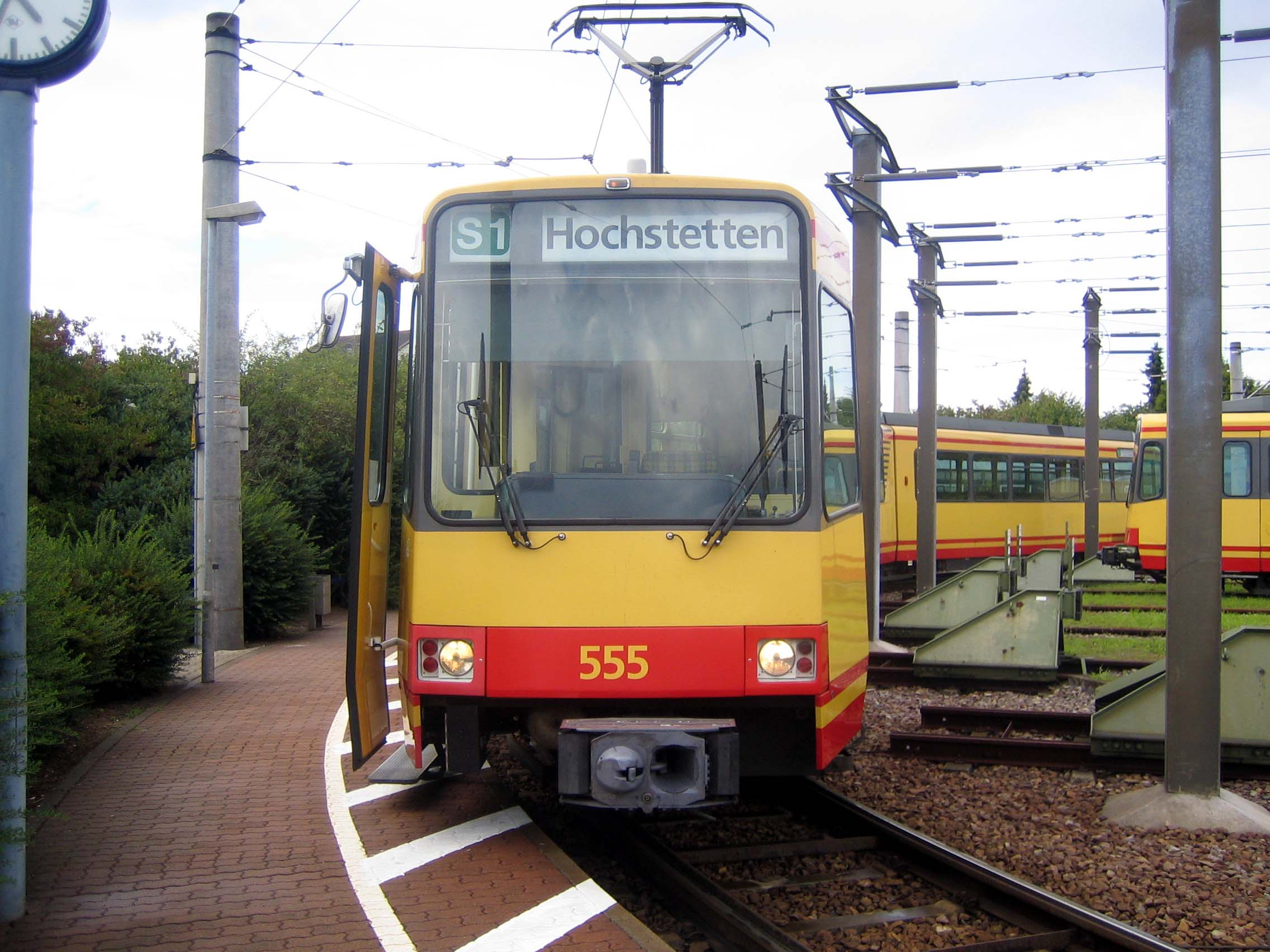
Terminus at Hochstetten in 2005; in 2008 the stop was moved away from the inconvenient curve

=== Extension to Leopoldshafen and Hochstetten (1979–1989) ===
On 2 July 1982, the city of Karlsruhe and the municipalities of Eggenstein-Leopoldshafen and Linkenheim-Hochstetten signed an agreement which provided for the extension of the Hardt Railway as far as Hochstetten.

In 1982, the city of Karlsruhe took over the line from the connection with the tram line from the DB. Freight on the line, however, was still operated by the DB. On 1 January 1987, the whole line from the tram loop in Nordweststadt to Neureut became the property of the AVG.

In 1983, Stadtbahn multiple units were purchased to replace the articulated multiple units used by AVG on A line in August 1983. The new sets offered significantly more capacity.

In November 1985, rebuilding began on the Hardt Railway between Neureut and Leopoldshafen. This section was opened on 13 December 1986. It follows the route of the old Hardt Railway as far as Eggenstein and it then runs through the town centre in Leopoldshafen. In 1987 and 1988, several platforms on the Hardt Railway were raised to 38 centimetres to give passengers a less difficult entry into the vehicles and thus accelerate boarding.

On 3 June 1989, the Hardt Railway was then extended to Hochstetten. The original plans had envisaged that the line would initially run through Linkenheim on the old route and then run on a new route through both Linkenheim and Hochstetten in order to open them up. Ultimately, the line was built entirely through the centre of Linkenheim on the former federal highway B 36, which was moved to a bypass in order to reduce conflicts with cars in the limited space in the town centres.

=== Further development (1989–1997) ===
Since 8 December 1989, a pair of trains run twice a day also to the Karlsruhe Research Centre. The track was extended for this purpose within the site at the research centre so that a station could be built. Shortly thereafter, in early 1990, it was agreed to allow freight trains to the research centre to pass in future through the centre of Leopoldshafen, making the old Hardt railway between Eggenstein and the branch to the research centre unnecessary. It was therefore dismantled in 1990. A steam locomotive was parked for a long time on the old route of the Hardt railway in Leopoldshafen. The track was officially closed on 27 May 1997.

In 1990, a second track was built on line in Neureut and, in 1992, a second track was built in Leopoldshafen between Frankfurter Str. station and the return loop. In early 1993, the section between Eggenstein Bahnhof (station) and Eggenstein Schweriner Str. was also rebuilt with two tracks.

With the establishment of the Karlsruher Verkehrsverbunde (Karlsruhe Transport Association) in 1994, line A was finally renamed S 1 (for services on the Hochstetten–Ettlingen (–Bad Herrenalb) route) and S 11 (for services on the Hochstetten–Ettlingen–Ittersbach route). At the end of 1995, the new station of Eggenstein Süd was opened south of Eggenstein and the second track was extended from Eggenstein Bahnhof to the new station, so that the Hardt Railway is now continuously double-track in Eggenstein.

In 1997, the section between Neureut-Kirchfeld station and the bridge over the highway 36 was duplicated and since then only about 500 metres of the line between Neureut and Eggenstein is single-track. The new double-track sections allow for better time keeping over the whole line.

=== Since 1998 ===
The AVG has upgraded or replaced the remaining tracks in Neureut and between Neureut and Eggenstein, which in places were around 100 years old. In order to facilitate the management of the line, the AVG bought the entire line from the DB, including the freight link between Neureut and Mühlburg, and took over the operation of the remaining freight traffic on the Hardt Railway.

In recent times there have been two fatal accidents on the Hardt Railway: at the end of 2003, a student was killed at Leopoldshafen Viermorgen and only a half year later there was a similar incident at Linkenheim Schulzentrum.

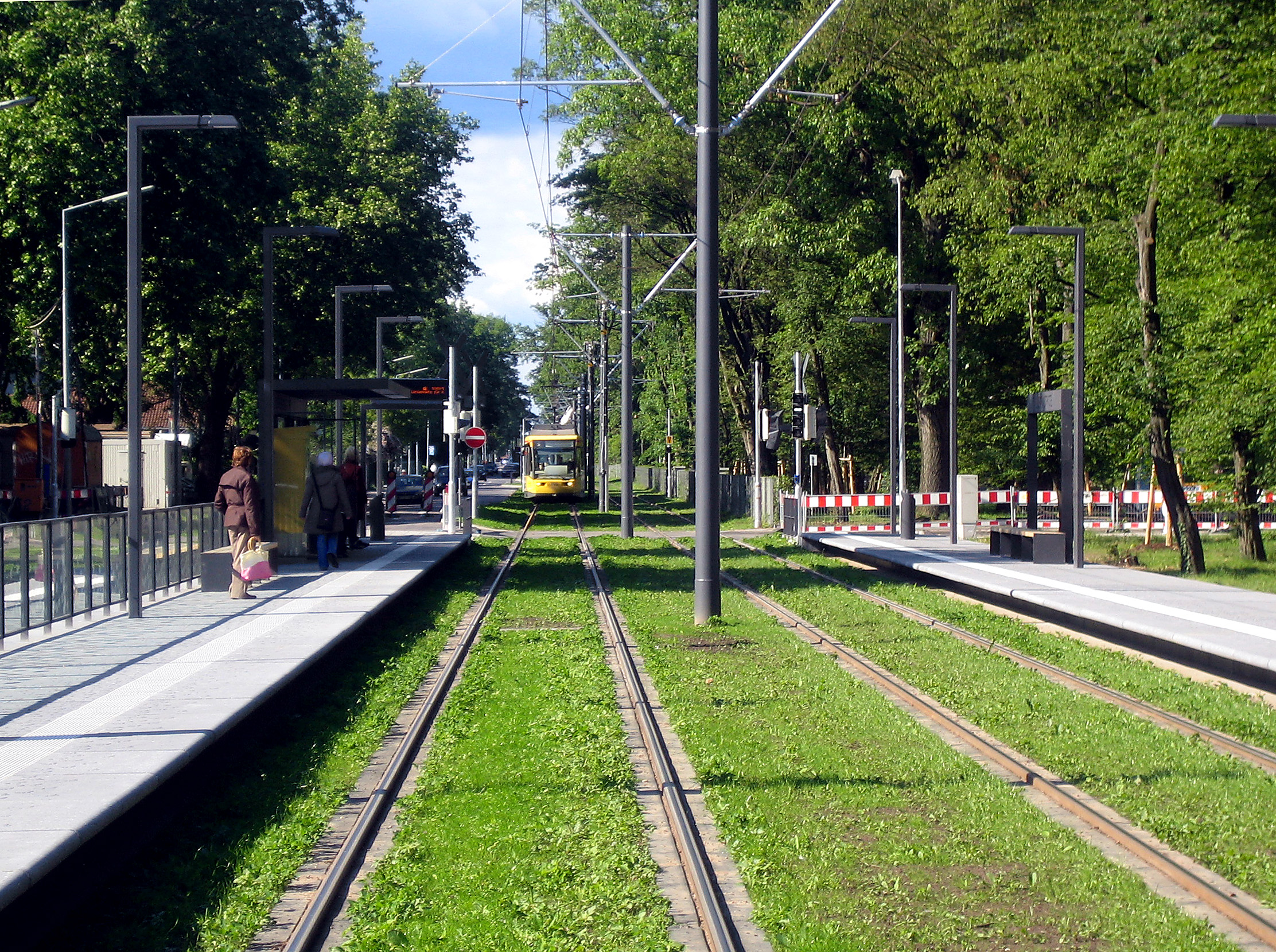
Tram line in Karlsruhe Nordstadt opened in 2006 on the route of the Hardt Railway from 1870 to 1913

The 1870–1913 route of the Hardt Railway through Karlsruher Nordstadt has been used since May 2006 as part of the tram network of Verkehrsbetriebe Karlsruhe (Karlsruhe Transport Company, VBK) for tram line 3.

== Possible extension from Dettenheim to Philippsburg ==
Attempts to have the Hardt Railway extended through the two Dettenheim districts of Liedolsheim and Rußheim to Philippsburg have not yet been implemented and it is unclear whether the extension will ever be realised. For a long time, according to the long-time chairman of the AVG Dieter Ludwig, there have only been "rough drawings with a pen."

Several years ago there were some preliminary investigations, which produced two options: both would leave the existing line just before the Hochstetten Altenheim stop and run straight ahead for about five hundred metres. The existing station would be relocated as a result.

While one version would run through the middle of the towns of Hochstetten and Liedolsheim, the other would only pass through the outskirts of these towns. Under both options Hochstetten would receive another stop and Liedolsheim would receive a total of two stops. In both options the line would run through Rußheim to end at Philippsburg station on the Bruhrain Railway.

== Operations ==
=== Timetable ===
The "New Hardt Railway" is now integrated into the Karlsruhe Stadtbahn network as lines S 1 and S 11. Both lines run from Hochstetten through the centre of Karlsruhe and over the Alb Valley Railway towards Ettlingen.

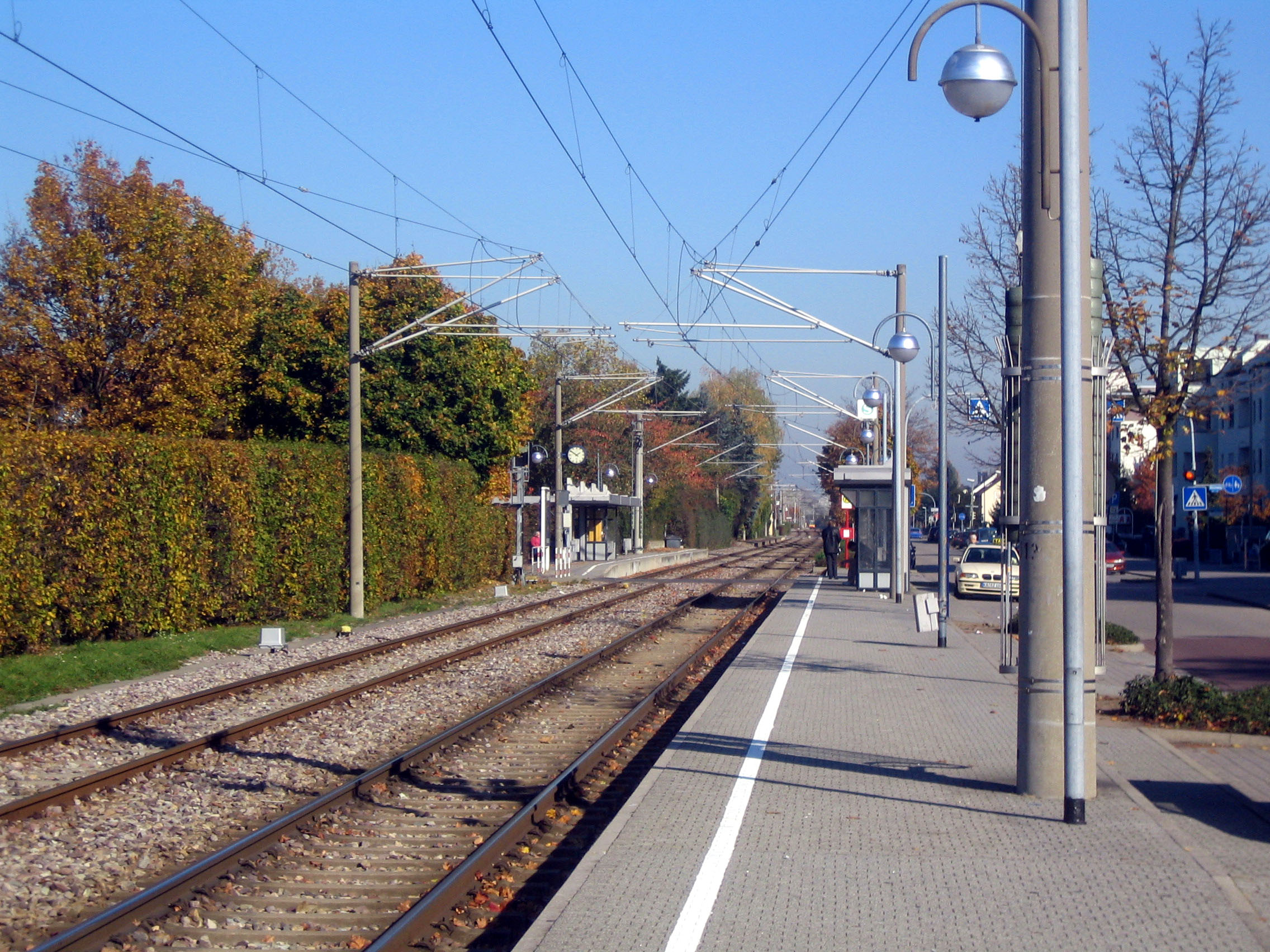
Neureut Bärenweg stop

Between Karlsruhe and Neureut services operate at ten-minute intervals to about 9 PM. Services operate to Hochstetten during the same period at least every 20 minutes and there are a few services that terminate at Leopoldshafen. The DC-powered Stadtbahn vehicles operated by AVG on the line are similar in construction to Stadtbahnwagen B vehicles. Dual-system (AC/DC) vehicles were in use on the Hardt Railway only in 1991 and 1992.

All stations have platforms with a height of 34 centimetres. Eggenstein Süd, Leopoldshafen Viermorgen, and Hochstetten Altenheim are request stops.

=== Operations to KIT Campus Nord ===
In the morning a total of two trains run to KIT Campus Nord (the north campus of the Karlsruhe Institute of Technology). The trains are decoupled at the Leopoldshafen Frankfurter Strasse stop with the front carriages continuing to Hochstetten and the rear carriages running to Campus Nord. The trip to Campus Nord can only be used by local staff, so a security check is performed shortly before the train reaches the site of the Campus Nord. Campus Nord station consists of two terminating tracks. Since there is no turning loop, the incoming set must be equipped for two-way operations or the departing trains must be operated in reverse (most Karlsruhe Stadtbahn vehicles are designed to only run in one direction normally). Two trains depart from Campus Nord in the afternoon peak hour. They wait at the Leopoldshafen Frankfurter Strasse stop for the train from Hochstetten, which is then coupled to the rear.

== Notes ==
=== References ===
- Karlsruhe City Archives, Verkehrsbetriebe Karlsruhe (2000). Manfred Koch (ed.). Unter Strom. Geschichte des öffentlichen Nahverkehrs in Karlsruhe (in German). Karlsruhe: Badenia-Verl. ISBN 3-7617-0324-4(Publications of the Karlsruhe City Archives, Vol 20)
- Klaus Bindewald (1998). Albtal-Verkehrs-Gesellschaft mbH (ed.). Die Albtalbahn. Geschichte mit Zukunft. Von der Schmalspurbahn zur modernen Stadtbahn (in German). Ubstadt-Weiher: Verl. Regionalkultur. ISBN 3-929366-79-7.
- Peter-Michael Mihailescu, Matthias Michalke (1985). Vergessene Bahnen in Baden-Württemberg (in German). Stuttgart: Konrad Theiss Verlag. pp. 35–38. ISBN 3-8062-0413-6.
