= Bad Herrenalb =

- Town
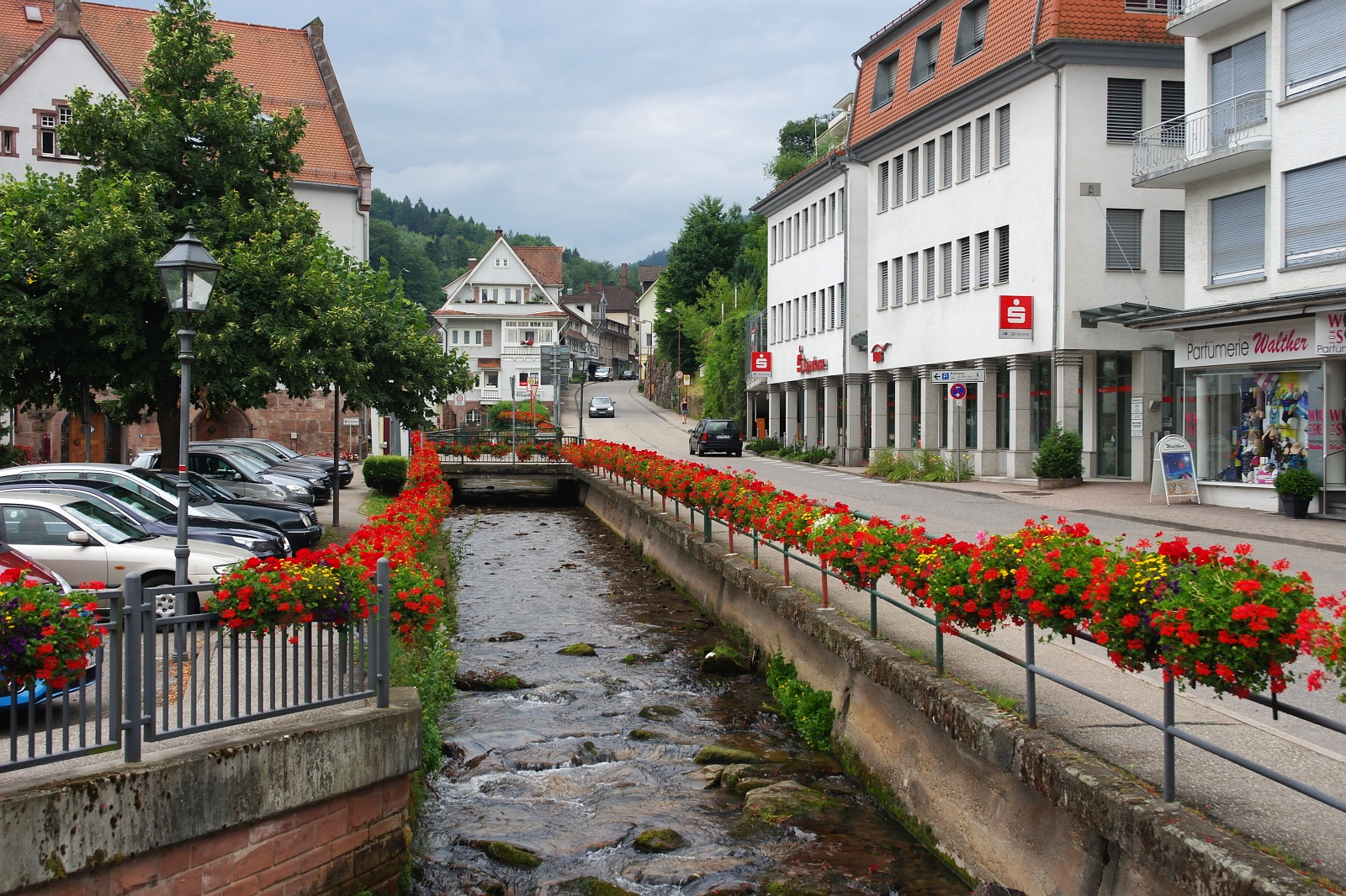

- Flag Coat of arms

- Location of Bad Herrenalb within Calw district
- Interactive map of Bad Herrenalb
- Location within Germany Location within Baden-Württemberg
- Coordinates: 48°48′2″N 8°26′27″E
- Country: Germany
- State: Baden-Württemberg
- Admin. region: Karlsruhe
- District: Calw

Government
  - Mayor (2019–27): Klaus Hoffmann

Area
  - Total: 33.01 km^{2} (12.75 sq mi)
- Elevation: 365 m (1,198 ft)

Population (2025-12-31)
  - Total: 7,681
  - Density: 232.7/km^{2} (602.7/sq mi)
- Time zone: UTC+01:00 (CET)
  - Summer (DST): UTC+02:00 (CEST)
- Postal codes: 76332
- Dialling codes: 07083
- Vehicle registration: CW
- Website: www.badherrenalb.de

Bad Herrenalb (German pronunciation: [baːt ˈhɛʁənˌʔalp]) is a town in the district of Calw, in Baden-Württemberg, Germany. It is situated in the northern Black Forest, 15 km east of Baden-Baden, and 22 km southwest of Pforzheim.

The town is connected to the city of Karlsruhe by the Albtalbahn, an electric railway that forms part of the Karlsruhe Stadtbahn. Bad Herrenalb is the terminus of one of the branches of the Albtalbahn, which operates as line S1.

== History ==
The town grew up around Alba Dominorum, a Cistercian monastery founded in 1148. The monastery was later dissolved during the Reformation. As early as 1841 Dr. J. Weiss established a cold water sanitarium which was later transformed into a water therapy institute with a sanitarium for nervous disorders. The sanitarium was further developed under the leadership of Councilor Dr. Mermagen.

Since 1954 Herrenalb is officially known as a “health resort.” In 1971 a 600 meter deep well was drilled into a mineral rich water source. With the exploitation of this source, Herrenalb officially appended the word “Bad” (German for bath) to its name on July 26, 1971.

On January 1 and February 1, 1972 the Rotensol and Neusatz were respectively incorporated into Bad Herrenalb. And finally, on January 1, 1975 Bernbach was likewise incorporated into the municipality.

== Mayors ==
- 1962–1996: Robert Traub (CDU)
- 1996–2004: Manfred Renz (born 1952), (GRÜNE)
- 2004–2020: Norbert Mai
- 2020–present: Klaus Hoffmann
