= Busenbach–Ittersbach railway =

Railway line in Germany

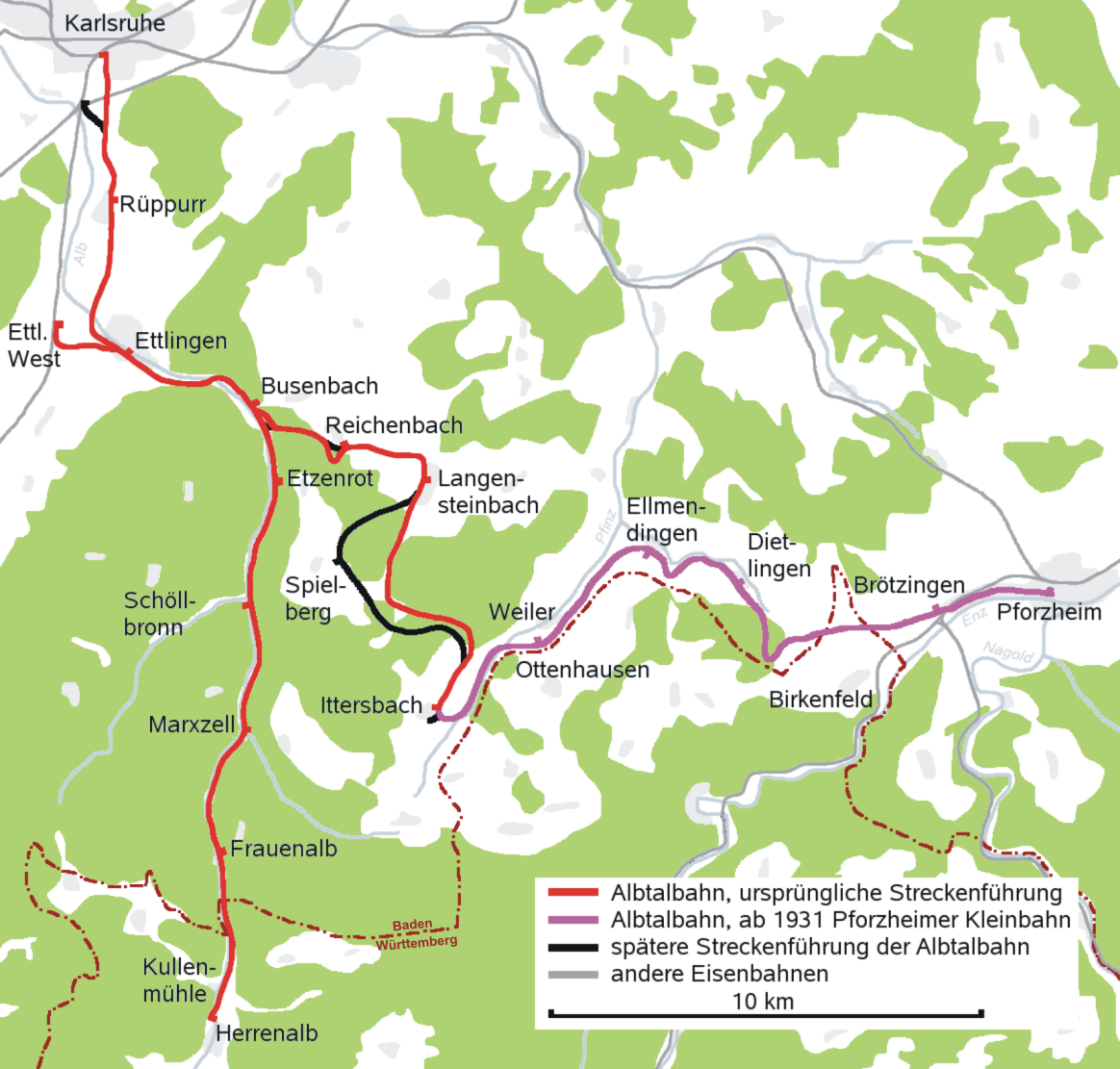

Overview
- Line number: 9421
- Locale: Baden-Württemberg, Germany

Service
- Route number: 710.1

Technical
- Line length: 14.4 km (8.9 mi)
- Track gauge: 1,435 mm (4 ft 8 1/2 in) standard gauge
- Old gauge: 1,000 mm (3 ft 3 3/8 in) metre gauge
- Electrification: 750 V DC overhead
- Maximum incline: 0.4%

The Busenbach–Ittersbach railway is a line in the northern Black Forest in the German state of Baden-Württemberg. The mostly single-track and continuously electrified line branches in Waldbronn-Busenbach from the Alb Valley Railway (German: Albtalbahn)—with which it is closely linked operationally and historically—and runs as a branch line to Ittersbach. The Albtal-Verkehrs-Gesellschaft (Alb Valley Transport Company, AVG) is responsible for the railway infrastructure and is the only company operating on the 14.4 kilometre-long line. Originally the Busenbach–Ittersbach railway was operated together with the Ittersbach to Pforzheim line, which later became the Pforzheim Light Railway (Pforzheimer Kleinbahn). The whole line from Busenbach to Pforzheim was initially built to 1,000 mm (3 ft 3 3/8 in) metre gauge, later the section from Busenbach to Ittersbach was rebuilt to 1,435 mm (4 ft 8 1/2 in) standard gauge and the Pforzheim Light Railway was closed. The line has been operated as part of line S 11 of the Karlsruhe Stadtbahn since 1994.

== History ==
The opening of the Alb Valley Railway from Karlsruhe to Busenbach on 14 May 1898 was followed by the opening of the Busenbach–Ittersbach section on 10 April 1899. These lines were originally metre gauge. The extension to Brötzingen, then a suburb of Pforzheim, followed on 2 January 1900. The line was initially operated with steam locomotives.

In 1898, the Busenbach–Ittersbach and the Alb Valley lines were taken over by the Badische Lokal-Eisenbahnen Aktiengesellschaft (Baden Local Railway Company, BLEAG), a newly formed subsidiary of the Westdeutsche Eisenbahn-Gesellschaft (West German Railway Company, WeEG).

In 1911, the line from Busenbach to Ittersbach was electrified with single-phase AC at 8,000 volts 25 Hz (later increased to 8,800 volts). Technical problems and a lack of thermal coal forced the BLEAG in 1917 to abandon electrical service on the branch line from Busenbach and later to remove the overhead wiring.

During the Great Depression, the BLEAG came under pressure and therefore it abandoned the unprofitable operations between Busenbach and Ittersbach in early 1931. The remaining section to Pforzheim, however, was sold to the town of Pforzheim, which then operated it as the Pforzheim Light Railway.

Only after the take over of the BLEAG by The German Railway Operating Company (Deutsche Eisenbahn-Betriebs-Gesellschaft), DEBG) in 1932 were operations between Busenbach and Ittersbach resumed. The line was electrified again by 1936.

On 1 April 1957, the AVG finally took over the line. Unlike the neighbouring Alb Valley Railway, the line to Ittersbach by AVG was not upgraded for full operations, but instead it was temporarily closed down on 14 November 1964. It was not until almost two years later, on 30 June 1966, that the section to Langensteinbach Süd was reopened with standard gauge and electrified at 750 Volt DC.

The following section to Ittersbach remained closed due to low demand. It was not until the municipality of Karlsbad was founded in 1971 that it was decided to reconstruct the Langensteinbach–Ittersbach section. This section was reopened on 16 October 1975. The new line left its original route to improve the connection to Spielbergof. So in 1975, operations ended on the Langensteinbach station–Langensteinbach Süd section, which had been reopened in 1966. The new line also runs closer to the centre in Ittersbach than the route used by the metre gauge line.

In 1979, the Busenbach–Reichenbach section was realigned and shortened. In 2011, a short double track section was also built between Langensteinbach and the newly created station of Schießhüttenäcker.

== Operations ==
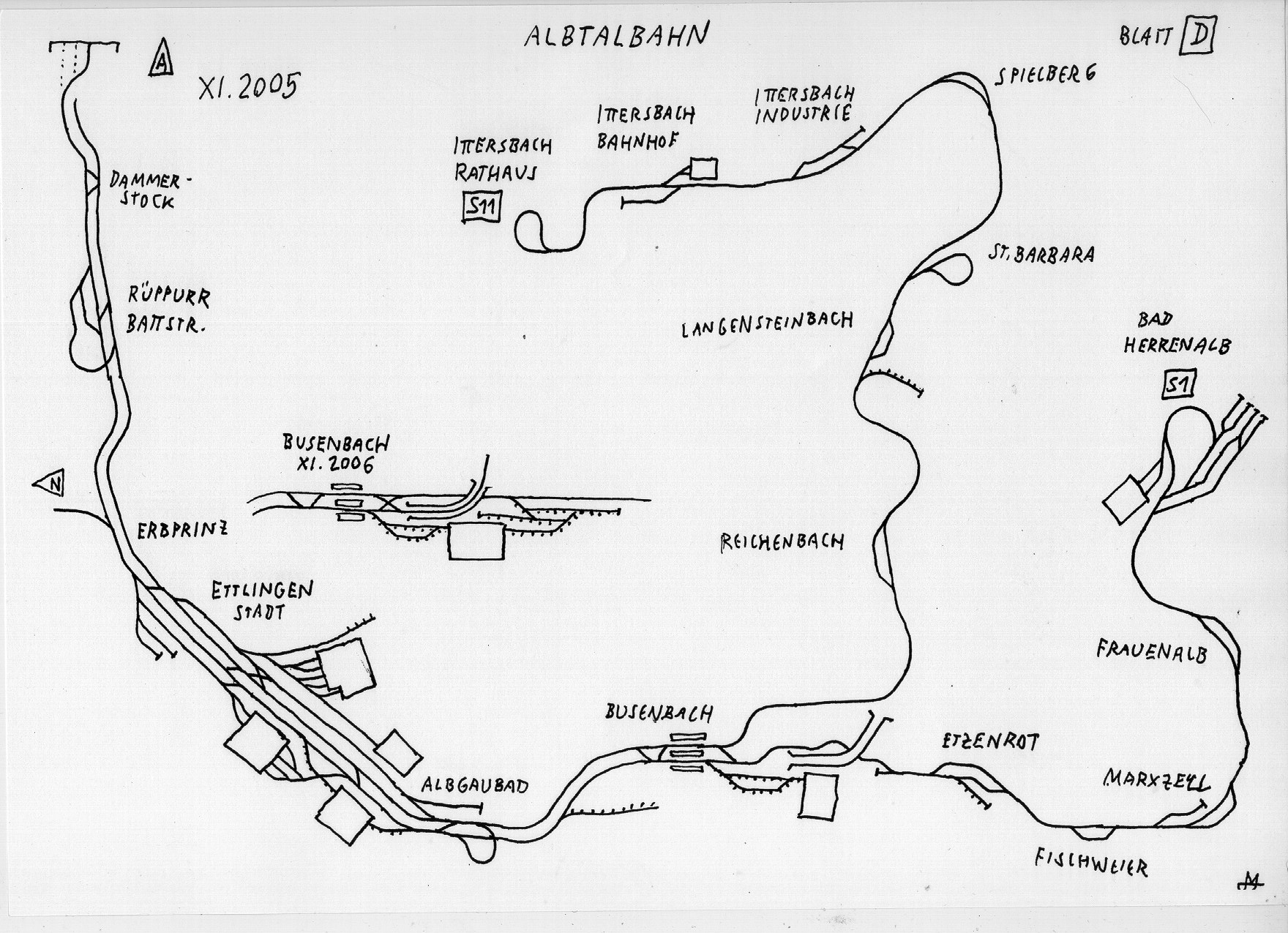
Track plan of the line (not to scale) as of 2006

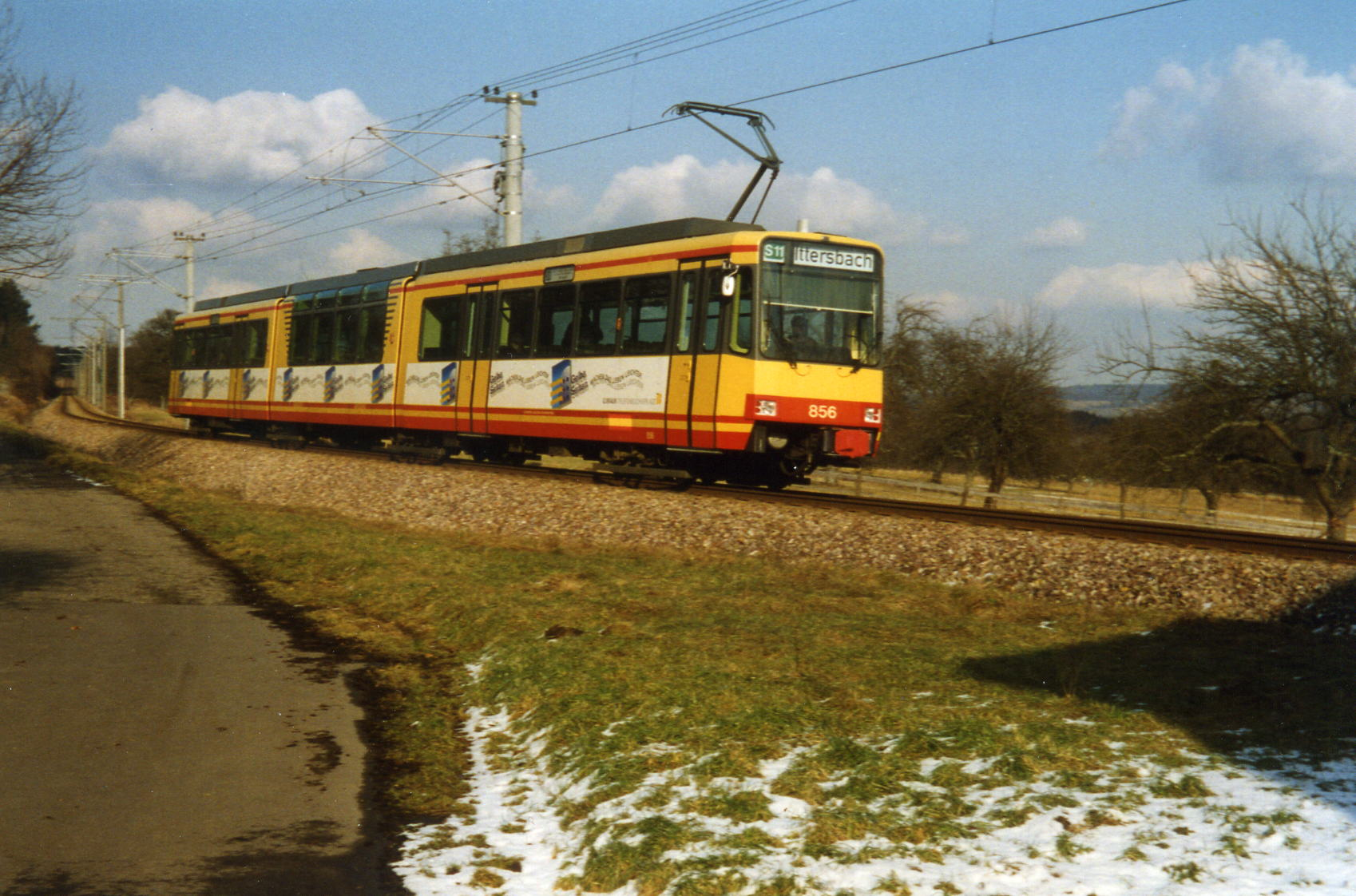
A train of line S 11 near Ittersbach

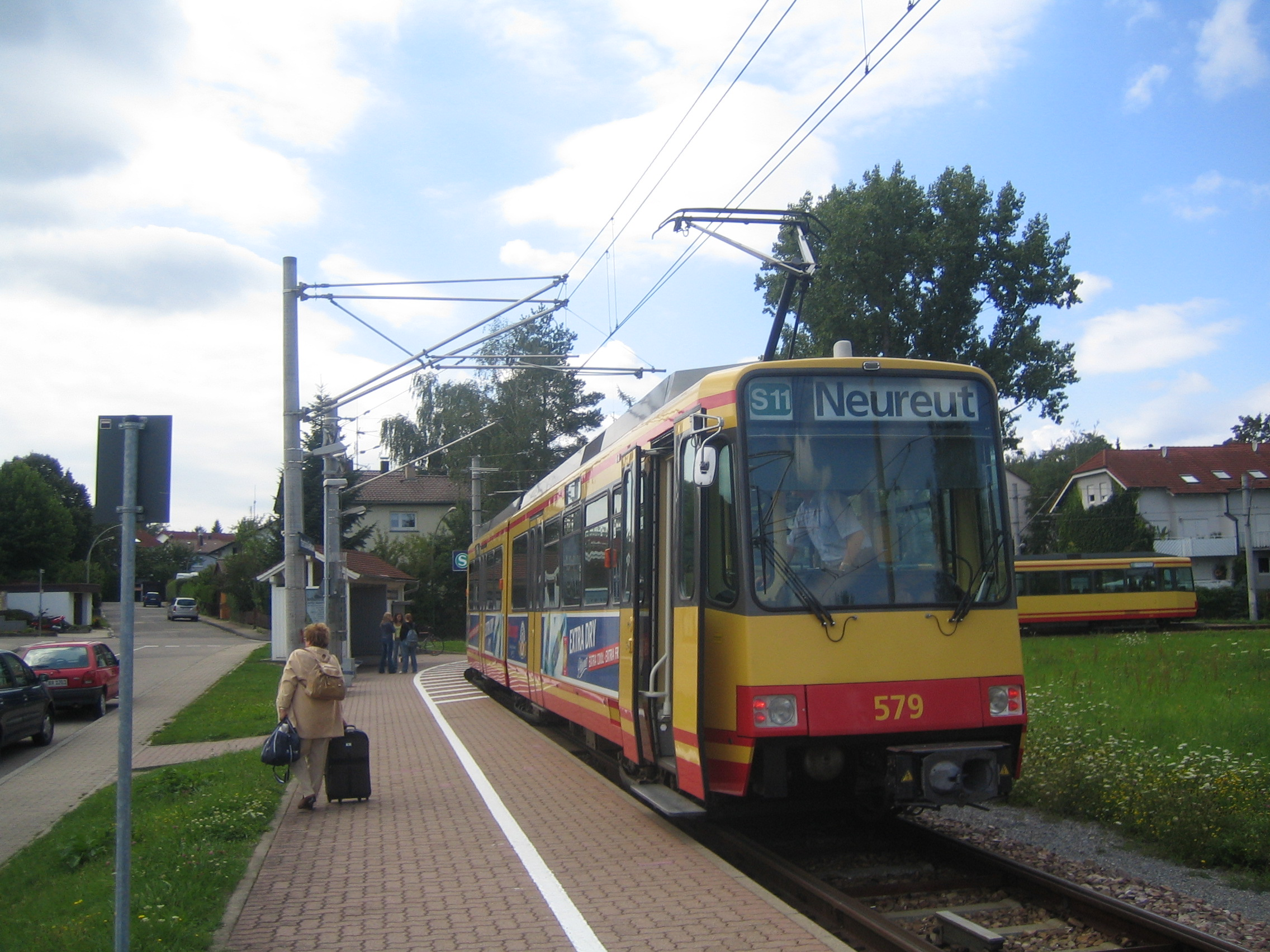
The end of the line at Ittersbach Rathaus

The Ittersbach line has been served during the daytime every 30 minutes by line S 11 of the Karlsruhe Stadtbahn since 1994. Previously the service on both the line to Bad Herrenalber and to Ittersbach had been called line A. The trains to and from Ittersbach run over the Alb Valley Railway and continue through Karlsruhe and usually end on the Hardt Railway (Hardtbahn). In the peak hour additional express services are run. No freight traffic operates on the line.

The platform height at most stations is 38 centimetres. Turning loops at Langensteinbach St. Barbara and Ittersbach Rathaus enable trains to be reversed. The whole line is operated under the regulations for operations applying to non-federally owned railways (Fahrdienstvorschriften Nichtbundeseigenen Eisenbahnen, FV-NE). There is a depot in Ittersbach.
