= Harmersbach Valley Railway =

Branch railway line in Baden-Württemberg, Germany

Coordinates: 48°21′26″N 8°05′48″E

Biberach–Oberharmersbach
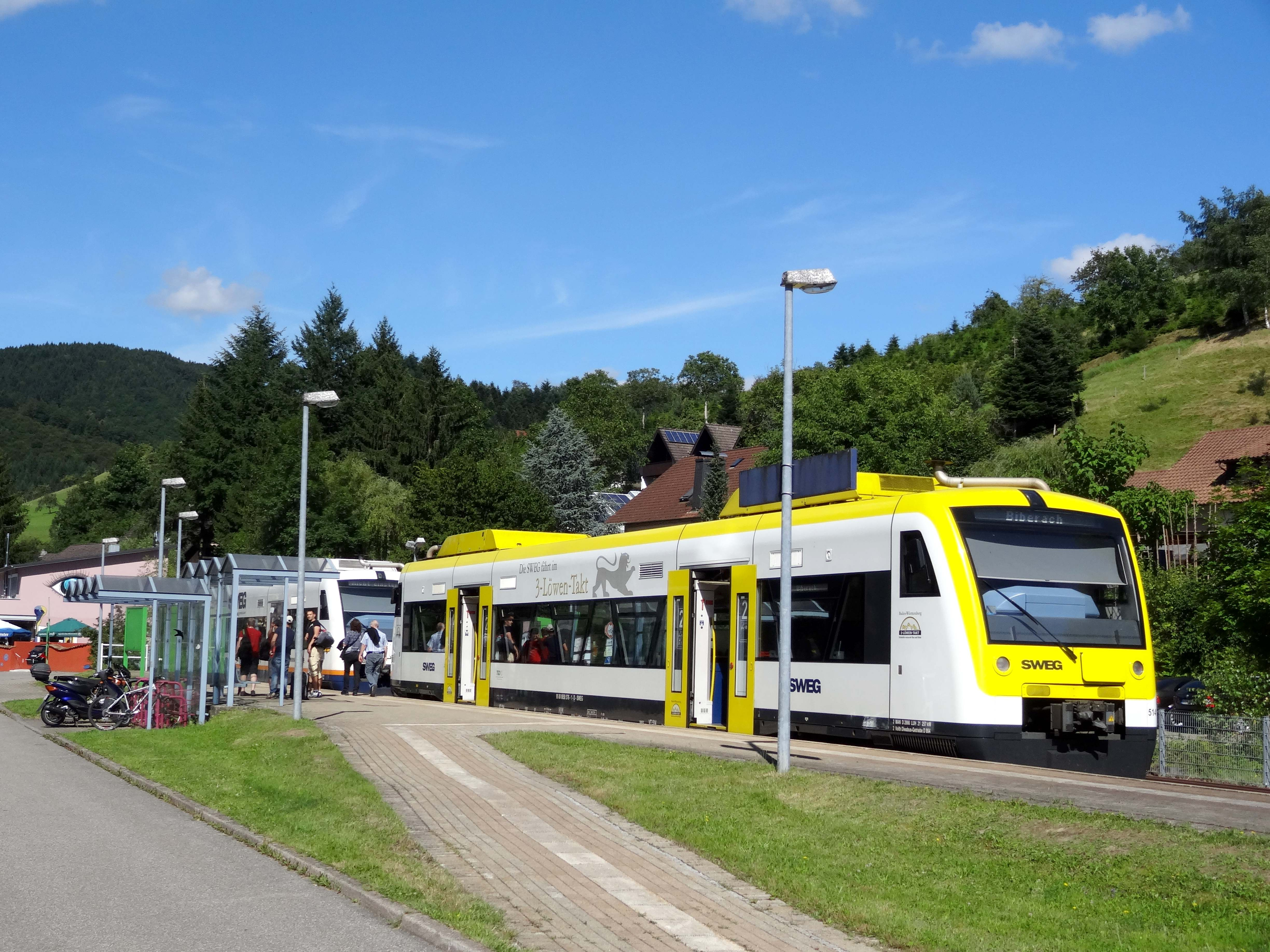
- Harmersbach Valley Railway

Service
- Route number: 722

Technical
- Line length: 10.6 km
- Track gauge: 1,435 mm

The Harmersbach Valley Railway (German: Harmersbachtalbahn) is a 10.6 km long branch line in southwestern Germany that branches off in Biberach from the Black Forest Railway and ends in Oberharmersbach-Riersbach.

The Harmersbach Valley Railway was opened on 15 December 1904 by the Vering & Waechter construction and operating company in Berlin, from whom it was transferred on 1 April 1917 to the German Railway Operating Company. Since 1963 it has belonged to the state-owned Südwestdeutsche Verkehrs-Aktiengesellschaft (SWEG). Its subsidiary, the Ortenau S-Bahn (OSB), runs the line today.

Since December 2005 single journeys via Biberach from and to Offenburg were connected. The rail traffic is enhanced by a parallel-running bus line owned by the SWEG, that is operated by a local sub-contractor.
