= Albtal-Verkehrs-Gesellschaft =

Public transport company of Karlsruhe, Germany

Albtal-Verkehrs-Gesellschaft (AVG)
- Industry: Public transport
- Founded: 1957; 69 years ago
- Headquarters: Karlsruhe, Germany
- Area served: north and north-west Baden-Württemberg, south-east Rhineland-Palatinate
- Owner: City of Karlsruhe (100%)
- Number of employees: 980
- Website: avg.info

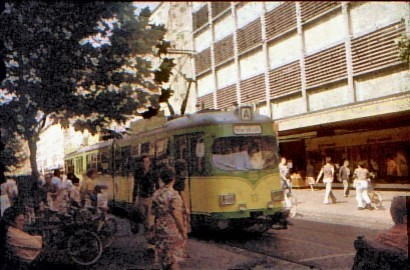
Albtalbahn train in the Kaiserstraße pedestrian precinct (1978)

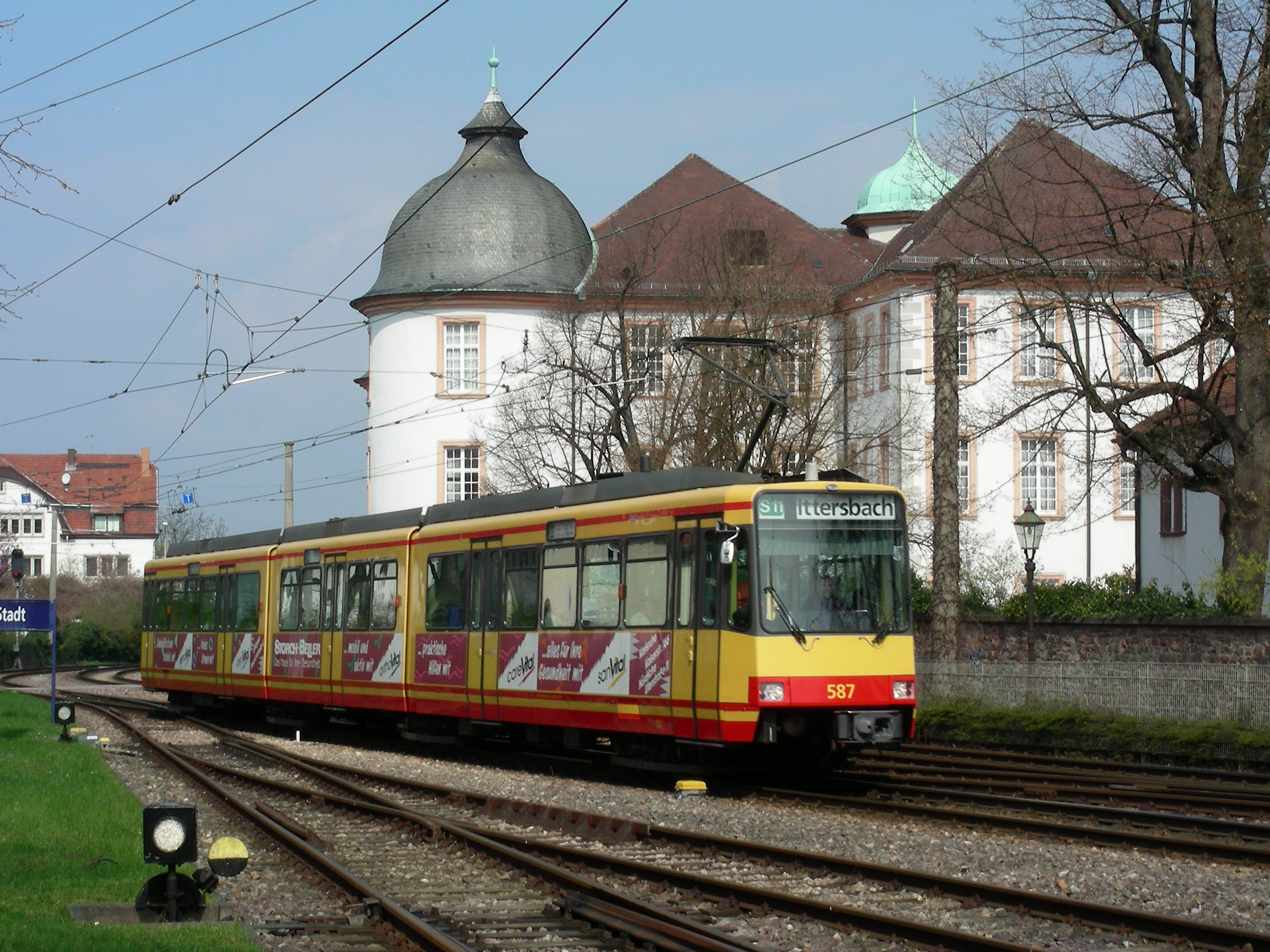
Albtalbahn train at Ettlingen (2006)

Albtal-Verkehrs-Gesellschaft ('Alb Valley Transport Company', AVG) is a railway company owned by the city of Karlsruhe that operates rail and bus services in the Karlsruhe area, southwest Germany. It is both a train operating company, as well as an infrastructure operator.

It is a member of the Karlsruher Verkehrsverbund (KVV) transport association that manages a common public transport structure for Karlsruhe and its surrounding areas and a partner, with the Verkehrsbetriebe Karlsruhe (VBK) and Deutsche Bahn (DB), in the operation of the Karlsruhe Stadtbahn, the pioneering tram-train system that serves a larger area. It also operates some of the region’s bus services and carries freight by road and rail.

It owns and maintains several railway lines, including the Albtalbahn railway, and leases and maintains other lines. VBK, a sister company, operates Karlsruhe's bus and tram network, and AVG Stadtbahn routes use VBK tracks to access the city centre. Besides AVG and VBK lines, AVG also operates on DB tracks and a short stretch of tram track belonging to the city of Heilbronn. VBK and DB Stadtbahn routes traverse AVG tracks.

AVG dates back to the acquisition in 1958 of the Albtalbahn railway by the city of Karlsruhe. This 1,000 mm (3 ft 3 3/8 in) metre gauge electric railway was converted to 1,435 mm (4 ft 8 1/2 in) standard gauge and connected to the city's tram network. Because it remained legally a railway and needed to conform to mainline railway design and safety standards, AVG accumulated experience in operating across the divide between tramway and railway. It was this experience that led to the development of the Stadtbahn Karlsruhe and to the AVG operating over a much wider area.

== Railway infrastructure ==
AVG rail network AVG infrastructure, 750 V DC AVG infrastructure, 15 kV 16.7 Hz AC AVG infrastructure (leased), 15 kV 16.7 Hz AC AVG infrastructure, not electrified VBK tram infrastructure, used by AVG tram-trains (selection) SWH tram infrastructure, used by AVG tram-trains DB InfraGO railway infrastructure, used by AVG tram-trains

AVG operates the following railway infrastructure (EBO rules). So of these lines are owned by other organisations, which have handed the operations of the infrastructure to AVG, or AVG is leasing them:

- electrified at 750 V DC
  - Albtalbahn (Karlsruhe Albtalbahnhof – Bad Herrenalb), 25.9 km
  - Busenbach–Ittersbach line, 14.1 km
  - Ettlingen Stadt–Ettlingen West link, 1.4 km
  - Hardtbahn (Neureut Welschneureuter Straße – Linkenheim Friedrichstraße), 11 km
  - KIT Campus Nord branch, 2 km
- electrified at 15 kV 16.7 Hz AC
  - Nagoldtalbahn (Pforzheim Hbf – Brötzingen Mitte), 2 km
  - Enztalbahn (Brötzingen Mitte – Bad Wildbad), 21.7 km
  - Kraichgaubahn (Karlsruhe-Grötzingen – Heilbronn Hbf), 63.9 km
  - Kraichtalbahn (Bruchsal – Odenheim), 15.2 km
  - Katzbachtalbahn (Ubstadt Ort – Menzingen), 14.7 km
  - Murgtalbahn (Rastatt – Freudenstadt), 57 km
  - Pfinztalbahn (Karlsruhe-Grötzingen – Söllingen), 5 km
  - Neckarsulm AVG link, 2.3 km
- non-electrified
  - Hardtbahn (Karlsruhe-Mühlburg – Neureut Welschneureuter Straße), 4.7 km
  - Wieslauterbahn (Hinterweidenthal Ost – Bundenthal-Rumbach), 15 km
  - Krebsbachtalbahn (Neckarbischofsheim Nord – Hüffenhardt), 16.9 km
  - Maulbronn West–Maulbronn Stadt branch, 2.8 km
  - Rastatt–Wintersdorf branch, 5.3 km
  - Hermann-Hesse-Bahn (Weil der Stadt–Calw), 20 km

It also operates the following tramway infrastructure (BOStrab rules), electrified at 750 V DC:

- Karlsruhe Reitschulschlag–Spöck Richard-Hecht-Schule, 10.7 km
- Karlsruhe Dornröschenweg–Mörsch Bach-West, 6.4 km
- Wörth Alte Bahnmeisterei–Wörth Badepark, 2.7 km
- Linkenheim Friedrichstraße–Hochstetten, 1.9 km
- Bad Wildbad Bahnhof–Bad Wildbad Kurpark, 0.7 km

== Rail services ==
As of 2024, AVG operates the following tram-train services as part of the Karlsruhe Stadtbahn system:

- S 1 Hochstetten – Karlsruhe – Bad Herrenalb
- S 11 Hochstetten – Karlsruhe – Ittersbach Rathaus
- S 12 Karlsruhe Rheinhafen – Ittersbach Rathaus
- S 31 Karlsruhe Hbf – Odenheim
- S 32 Karlsruhe Hbf – Menzingen
- S 4 Karlsruhe Albtalbahnhof – Heilbronn – Öhringen-Cappel
- S 41 Heilbronn Hbf – Mosbach (Baden)
- S 42 Heilbronn Hbf – Sinsheim Hbf
- S 5 Wörth Badepark – Karlsruhe – Pforzheim Hbf
- S 51 Germersheim – Karlsruhe – Söllingen
- S 52 Germersheim – Karlsruhe Marktplatz
- S 6 Pforzheim Hbf – Bad Wildbad Kurpark
- S 7 Karlsruhe Tullastraße – Achern (via Durmersheim)
- S 71 Karlsruhe Hbf – Achern (via Ettlingen West)
- S 8 Karlsruhe Tullastraße – Bondorf (via Durmersheim)
- S 81 Karlsruhe Hbf – Bondorf (via Ettlingen West)
- FEX Odenheim/Menzingen – Karlsruhe – Bad Herrenalb
