= German Railway Operating Company =

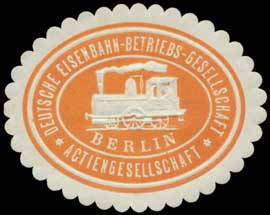
Seal/Logo of the company

The German Railway Operating Company (German: Deutsche Eisenbahn-Betriebs-Gesellschaft) or DEBG was a public limited company (Aktiengesellschaft) that was founded on 15 November 1898 in Berlin. It was founded by the Vering & Waechter railway construction and operating company, the firm of Doertenbach & Co and the Central German Credit Bank (Mitteldeutsche Creditbank).

== Acquisition of branch lines ==
The DEBG immediately took over from Vering & Waechter the running powers for twelve branch lines with a total length of 184 km. These included seven railways of foreign owners in all parts of the German Reich, however these were given up again in the years that followed. One of them was the narrow gauge Gernrode-Harzgerode Railway in the Harz mountains. The remaining five were transferred to the DEBG in 1898/99; four of them were in the Grand Duchy of Baden.

After the turn of the century the centre of gravity for the business was now clearly in the southwestern part of the Empire. The DEBG built another four railways in Baden and three in Alsace-Lorraine, the latter being lost again in 1919/20 after the First World War.

The loss of the lines in Alsace-Lorraine was balanced out by the procurement of five railways from the Badischen Lokal-Eisenbahn-Gesellschaft (BLEAG) on 22 December 1931. This expansion added 131 km of line and resulted in the DEBG achieving its highest network length of 264.5 km excluding the 32 km of the VEE.

At the start of the Second World War the following branch lines in Baden belonged to the DEBG:

- Acher Valley Railway
- Alb Valley Railway
- Katzbach Railway
- Kraich Valley Railway
- Bühler Valley Railway
- Harmersbach Valley Railway
- Jagst Valley Railway
- Kander Valley Railway
- Münster Valley Railway
- Neckarbischofsheim–Hüffenhardt railway
- Oberschefflenz-Billigheim railway
- Orschweier-Ettenheimmünster railway
- Wiesloch–Meckesheim/Waldangelloch railway

In the north of Germany the DEBG only owned the Voldagsen-Duingen-Delligsen railway which ran through the Prussian provinces of Hanover and the neighbouring state of Brunswick. There in the Weser Uplands it also ran the Vorwohle-Emmerthal Railway Company, in which it had acquired a majority shareholding. The VEE owned the main workshop for all DEBG railways in Bodenwerder-Linse; it was also responsible for the Baden railways.

== Development after the Second World War ==
The establishment of the Inner German Border did not affect the DEBG as all its railways lay in West Germany. Nevertheless, as a result of declining demand on the DEBG's branch lines it withdrew progressively from railway operations.

In 1956/57 it sold the electrified sections of the Alb Valley Railway, that ran from Karlsruhe to the northern Black Forest, to the state of Baden-Württemberg, who transferred them to the newly founded Abtal-Verkehrs-GmbH.

After the end of 1956 passenger services on the Bühl–Oberbühlertal railway were withdrawn, goods traffic ceased in autumn 1958. The remaining ten lines in Baden-Württemberg were transferred by the DEBG on 1 May 1963 into the newly formed state-owned Südwestdeutsche Eisenbahn.

In 1968 the DEBG also got rid of the Voldagsen-Duingen-Delligsen branch line. Meanwhile, the company began to be wound up; this was concluded in 1970. Operations by the VEE were transferred on 1 May 1967 to the Vorwohle-Emmerthaler Verkehrsbetriebe.

== Sources ==
- Meinhard Döpner: Die Deutsche Eisenbahn-Betriebs-Gesellschaft AG, Gülzow 2002
