= Forschungsreaktor 2 =

Coordinates: 49°05′29″N 8°25′46″E

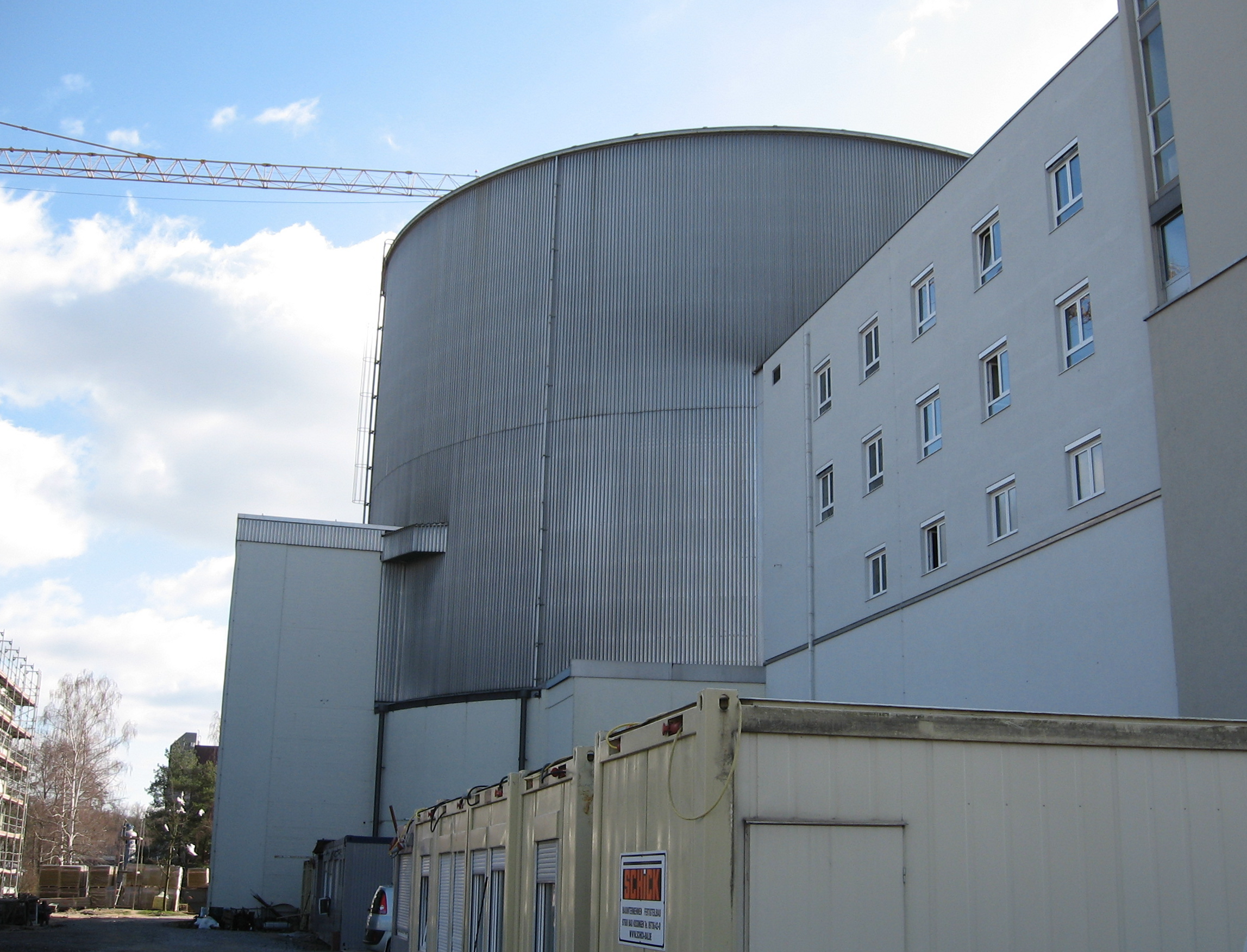
Forschungsreaktor 2 at the Karlsruhe Institute of Technology

The Forschungsreaktor 2 (FR2) (German: Research Reactor 2) was the second nuclear reactor built in and by Germany after restrictions on nuclear research imposed as a result of the Second World War were lifted in 1955. Construction began in 1957 in Eggenstein-Leopoldshafen/BW. The organization charged with the project evolved into the Kernforschungszentrum Karlsruhe (KfK) (Karlsruhe Nuclear Research Centre), which in turn evolved into the present day Karlsruhe Institute of Technology (KIT).

FR2 started up on December 12, 1962, and ceased operation in December 1981. As of 2005, the reactor core is contained, and the auxiliary buildings have been demolished or are being used for non-nuclear research activities, mostly in micro process engineering, which uses manufacturing technologies that originated from mechanical microstructuring processes that had been developed in the context of nuclear technologies (isotope separation).
