= Malsch station =

Railway station in Malsch, Germany

Malsch
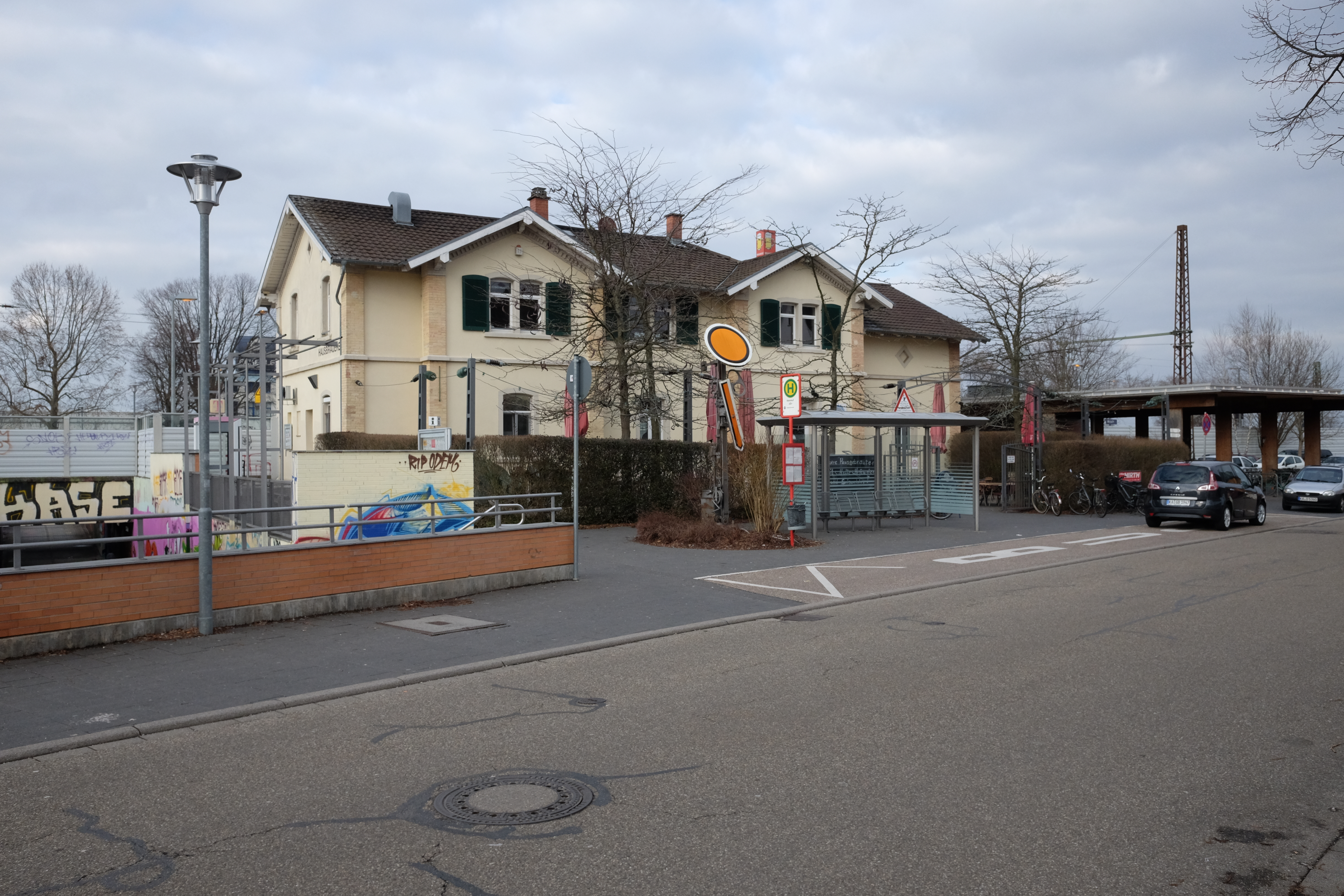
- Old station building, now used as brewery

General information
- Location: Bahnhofstr. 2, 76316 Malsch, Baden-Württemberg, Germany
- Coordinates: 48°53′22″N 8°19′26″E
- Line: Rhine Valley Railway (km 87.9)
- Tracks: 2

Construction
- Accessible: Yes

Other information
- Station code: 3917
- DS100 code: RMS
- IBNR: 80003917
- Category: 6
- Fare zone: KVV: 241
- Website: www.bahnhof.de

History
- Opened: 1 May 1844
Location

Malsch station is together with Malsch Süd station one of two stations in the municipality of Malsch in the German state of Baden-Württemberg. The station is located at kilometer 96.5 of the Rhine Valley Railway (Rheintalbahn) and is served by two lines of the Karlsruhe Stadtbahn.

== History ==
The station was opened on 1 May 1844 by the Grand Duchy of Baden State Railway along with the Karlsruhe Hbf–Rastatt section of the Rhine Valley Railway, which connects Mannheim and Basel.

The line was electrified in the 1950s.

In 2002, Malsch was officially integrated into the network of the Karlsruhe Stadtbahn. It was served by the former line S3, which originally ran only between Bruchsal and Karlsruhe, but was extended to Baden-Baden in 2002. In 1998, Stadtbahn line S31 was opened from Bruchsal to Odenheim and was extended to serve the line through Malsch in 2000. After S-Bahn line S3 of the Rhine-Neckar S-Bahn from Speyer via Mannheim and Heidelberg to Karlsruhe was opened in December 2003, Karlsruhe Stadtbahn line S3 was renumbered to the current S32 to avoid confusion.

During the last renovation of Malsch station, the former set of points were removed, so that the station is now classified as a Haltepunkt (halt) rather than a Bahnhof (station).

== Station building ==
There is now a brewery called Alter Bahnhof (old station) in the former entrance building of Malsch station.

== Rail services ==
In the 2026 timetable, the following services stop at the station:

Line	Route	Frequency
RB 41	Forbach – Gaggenau – Rastatt – Malsch – Karlsruhe Hbf	Hourly
RB 44	Rastatt – Malsch – Karlsruhe Hbf	Hourly
S 71	Achern – Baden-Baden – Rastatt – Muggensturm – Malsch – Karlsruhe Hbf	Some trains
S 81	Bondorf (bei Herrenberg) – Freudenstadt Hbf – Baiersbronn – Forbach (Schwarzw) – Rastatt – Muggensturm – Malsch – Karlsruhe Hbf	1 train pair
As of 14 December 2025

Malsch station is also served by buses on route 110, running between Waldprechtsweier, Malsch, Bruchhausen and Ettlingen Erbprinz.
