= Katzbach Railway =

Railway line in Germany

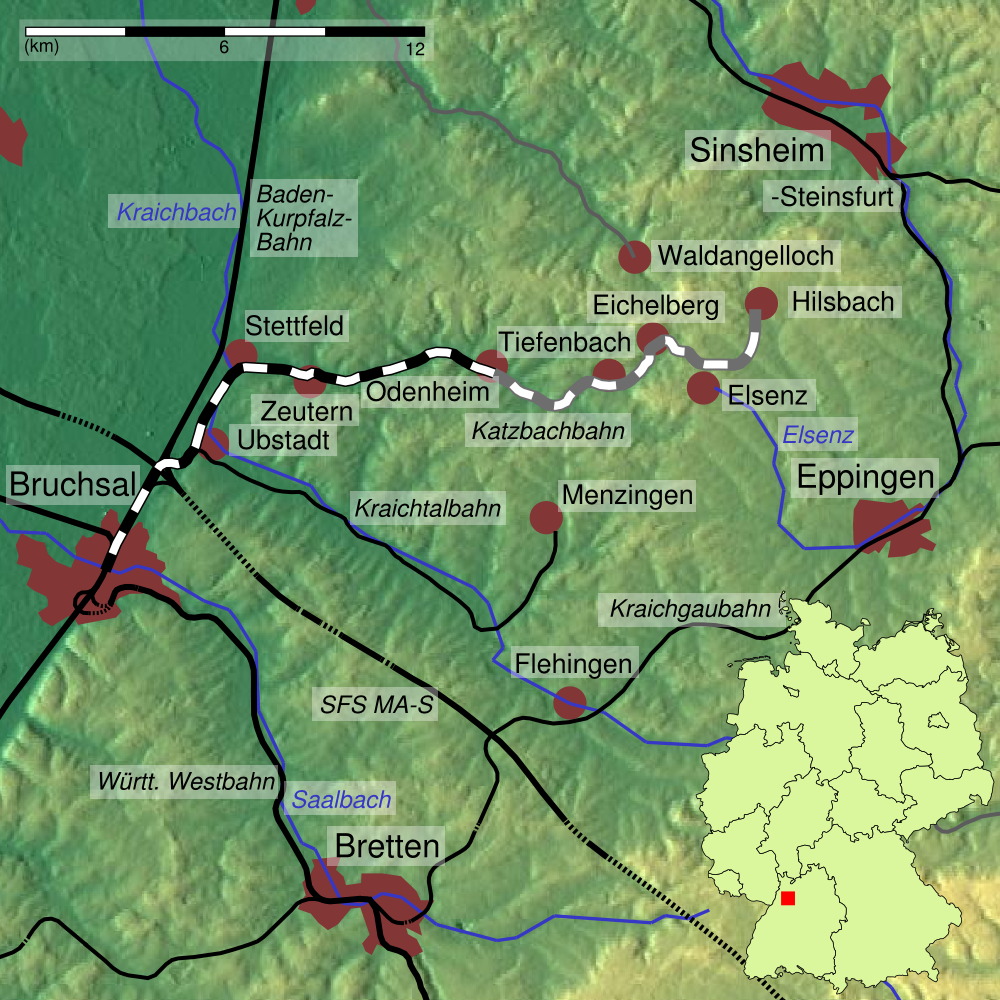

Overview
- Native name: Katzbachbahn
- Line number: 9412
- Locale: Baden-Württemberg

Service
- Route number: 710.3

Technical
- Line length: 27.3 km (17.0 mi)
- Track gauge: 1,435 mm (4 ft 8 1/2 in) standard gauge
- Minimum radius: 155.19 m (509.2 ft)
- Electrification: 15 kV/16.7 Hz AC; Overhead catenary

The Katzbach Railway (German: Katzbachbahn) is a branch line in southwestern Germany from Bruchsal to Odenheim that opened in 1896, and was extended in 1900 to Hilsbach. In 1960 services between Tiefenbach and Hilsbach were withdrawn, in 1975 the section between Odenheim Ost and Tiefenbach followed and, in 1986, the 600-metre-long section from Odenheim station to Odenheim Ost was closed. Since 1994 the line has been operated by the Albtal-Verkehrs-Gesellschaft (AVG), who electrified it in 1998 and integrated it into the network of the Karlsruhe Stadtbahn.

The line follows its namesake, the Katzbach stream, from Stettfeld to Odenheim. Together with the neighbouring Kraich Valley Railway from Bruchsal to Menzingen, with which it shares a common trackbed as far as Ubstadt Ort, it has formed a single operating unit since its inception.

== Route ==
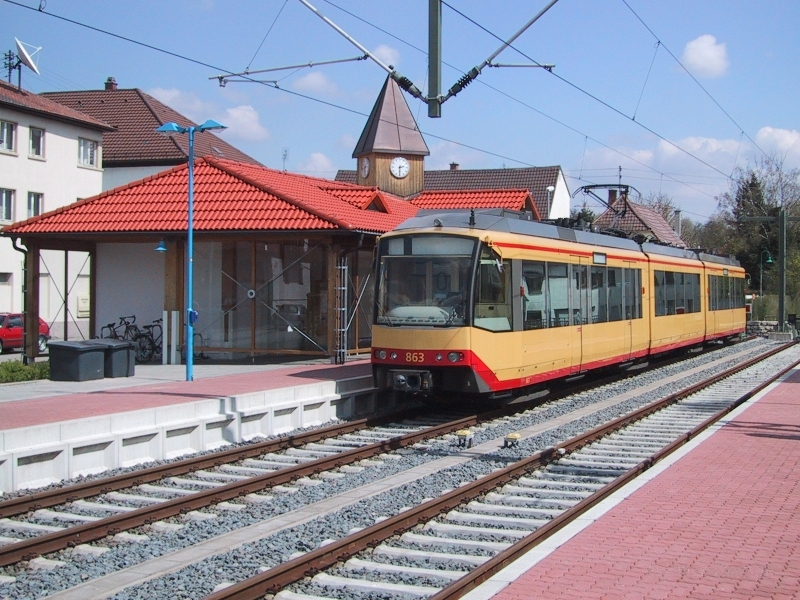
Stadtbahn train of the S31 in Odenheim station

After Bruchsal station, the Katzbach line runs together with the Kraich Valley Railway as a single track parallel with the Rhine Valley Railway through the stations of Bruchsal Schlossgarten and Bruchsal Stegwiesen before it leaves the main line for Ubstadt Ort, where it separates from the Kraich Valley Railway. The Katzbach Railway continues straight on to Ubstadt Uhlandstraße station and runs to Stettfeld next to the Kraichbach. At Stettfeld, it turns to climb beside the Katzbach and passes through the hilly landscape of the Kraichgau. After it has passed through Zeutern, it reaches the current end of the line at Odenheim.

The current line follows two river valleys, while the topographical conditions of the closed section to Hilsbach was much more difficult, which is the reason it was built later.

Before the Baden-Württemberg administrative reform of 1973, the towns along the railway line from Bruchsal to Odenheim were in the district of Bruchsal, while the remaining municipalities (Tiefenbach, Eichelberg, Elsenz and Hilsbach) were part of the district of Sinsheim. The line was ultimately closed because the connection to Sinsheim was never completed and patronage on the last section of the line was rather low.

Since the administrative reform both the municipalities and the districts that include the places along the line have become a bit more complicated: from Ubstadt to Zeutern the Katzbach line is within the municipality of Ubstadt-Weiher; Odenheim, Tiefenbach and Eichelberg are now municipality of Östringen, Elsenz is now part of Eppingen and Hilsbach is part of Sinsheim. Thus, the historic Katzbach line passes through three districts: the district of Karlsruhe from Bruchsal to Eichelberg, the district of Heilbronn in Elsenz and the former section to its terminus Hilsbach is part of the Rhein-Neckar district.

=== The route of the disused Odenheim–Hilsbach section ===
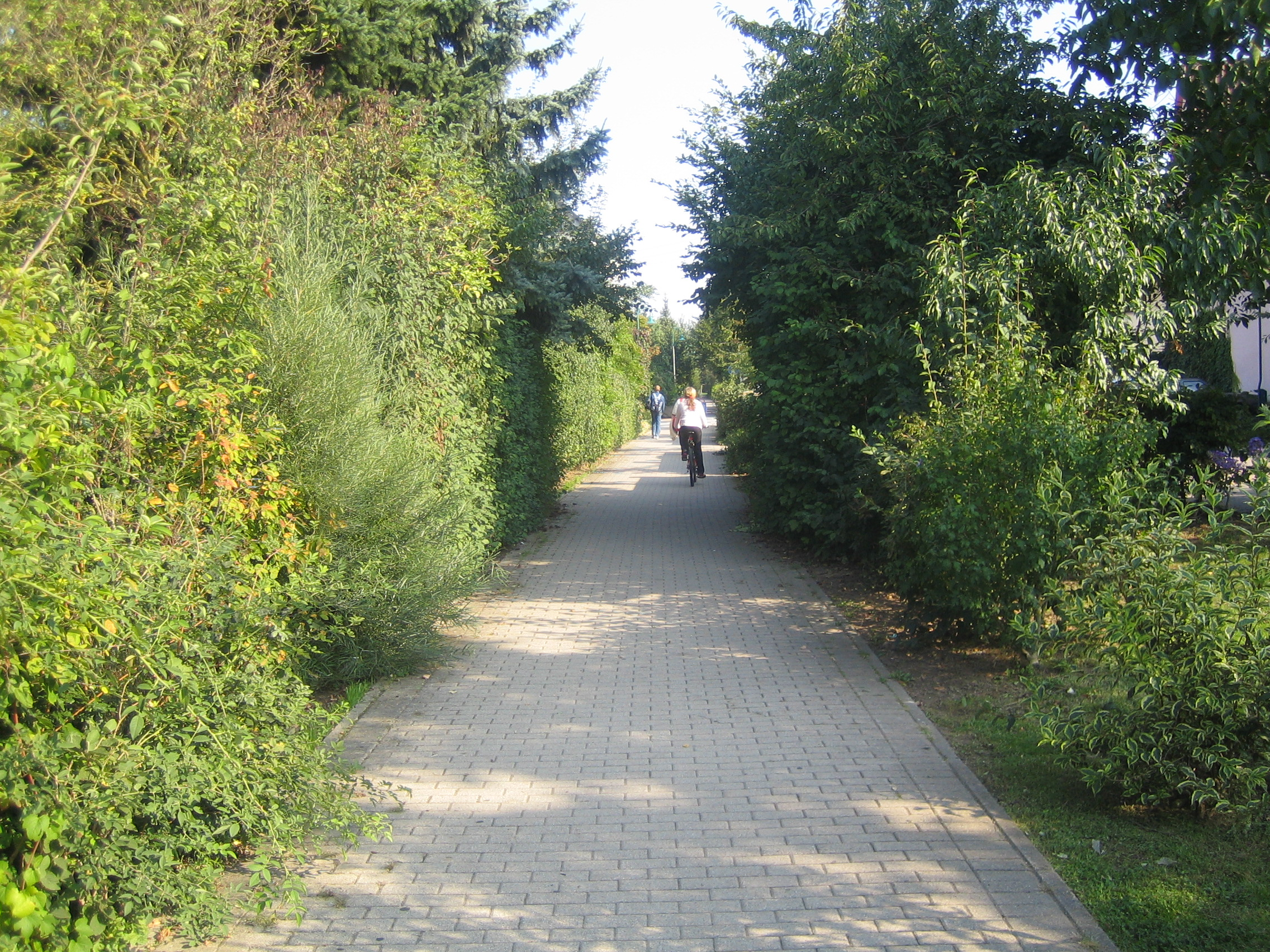
Cycle path on the closed Odenheim-Hilsbach section

A cycle path that runs on the route of the old line begins on the other side of the street immediately after the current end of the line at Odenheim. Only a few metres after the start of the closed section there is a train signal, which was forgotten during the dismantling of the line. Near the next level crossing was the location of Odenheim Ost station, which was the end of the line from 1975 to 1986. At the eastern edge of Odenheim, the line was demolished over a length of about three hundred metres for the realignment of state highway 552.

In Tiefenbach, the former line has also been converted into a cycle path. The railway viaduct over the Katzbach valley in Eichelberg is still preserved. It was renovated in 1988 by the City of Östringen at a cost of 155,000 Deutsche Marks and converted into a hiking and biking trail. The Elsenz station building has now been converted into residential accommodation; elsewhere in Elsenz the route of the line has been built on, but some sleepers still exist in Elsenz. Between Elsenz and Hilsbach the line climbs almost entirely through meadows and fields. There are also other smaller bridges over streams, including in Tiefenbach and Hilsbach, which are now used for hiking trails.

== History ==
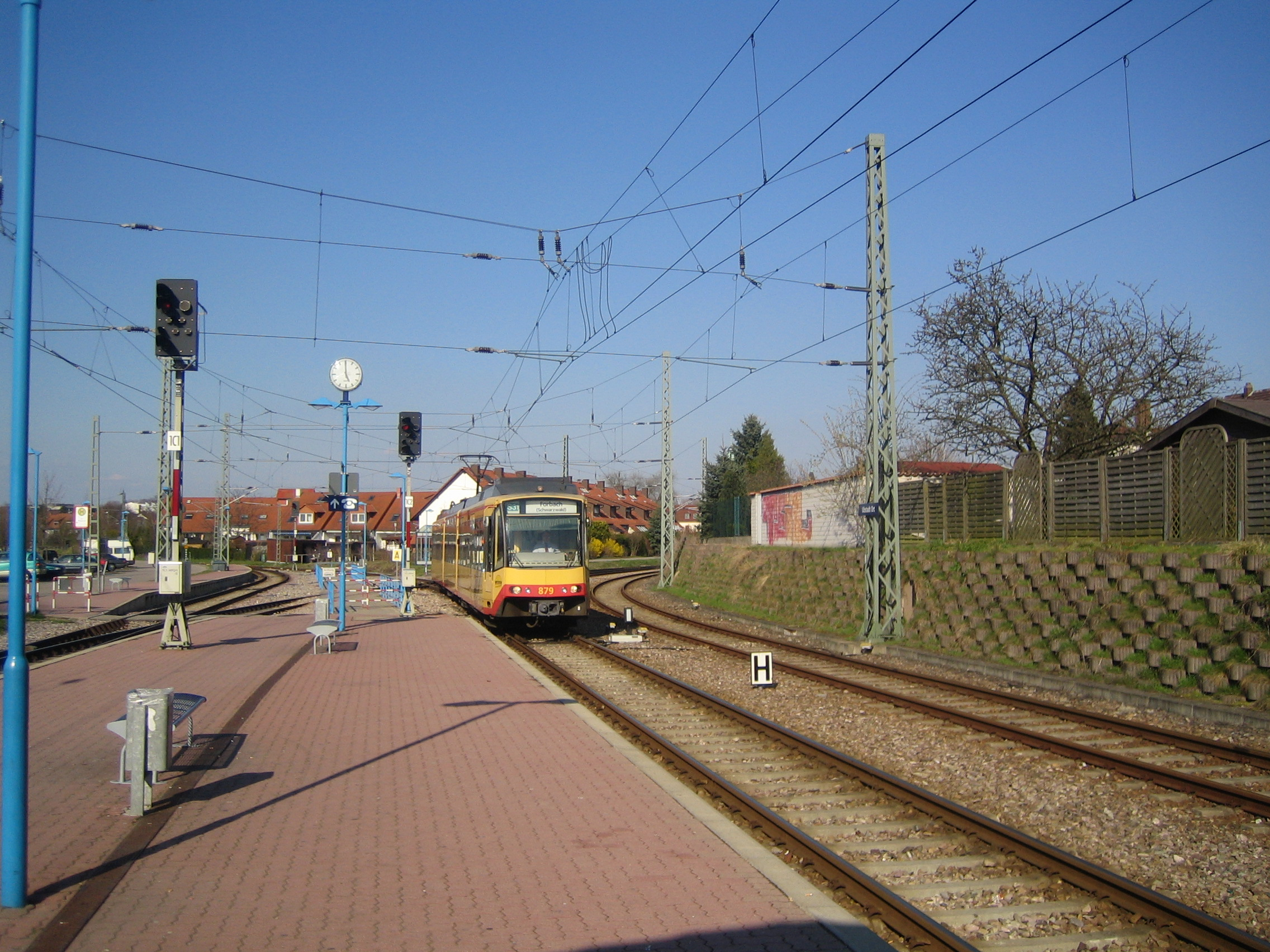
Stadtbahn train from Odenheim at the entrance to Ubstadt Ort station

=== Planning, construction and opening of the line (1870–1898) ===
In the 1870s, Bruchsal campaigned unsuccessfully for a rail link with the towns on the Kraichbach: Ubstadt, Unteröwisheim, Oberöwisheim, Münzesheim and Gochsheim.

More than a decade later, the city took the initiative in 1888 to build, together with the municipalities in the Kraichbach and the Katzbach valleys, a narrow gauge branch line with two branches, separating in Ubstadt. The northern line would run through Odenheim to Elsenz and the southern branch up the Kraichbach valley to Gochsheim.

Originally planned to run as far as Elsenz, it was decided that the line would initially run only as far as Odenheim because of the hilly terrain between Odenheim and Elsenz. At the same time, it was also decided that the line would be built at standard gauge.

On 5 March 1896, what is now called the Katzbach railway was opened from Bruchsal to Odenheim together with the Kraich Valley Railway between Bruchsal and Menzingen. The line was initially operated by the Westdeutsche Eisenbahn-Gesellschaft (West German Railway Company, WeEG).

In the first years of operation, there was a high level of passenger traffic and some growth in freight traffic. Therefore, the municipalities of Tiefenbach, Eichelberg, Elsenz and Hilsbach were also interested in being connected to the line. In the longer term, the line was to be extended even towards Sinsheim.

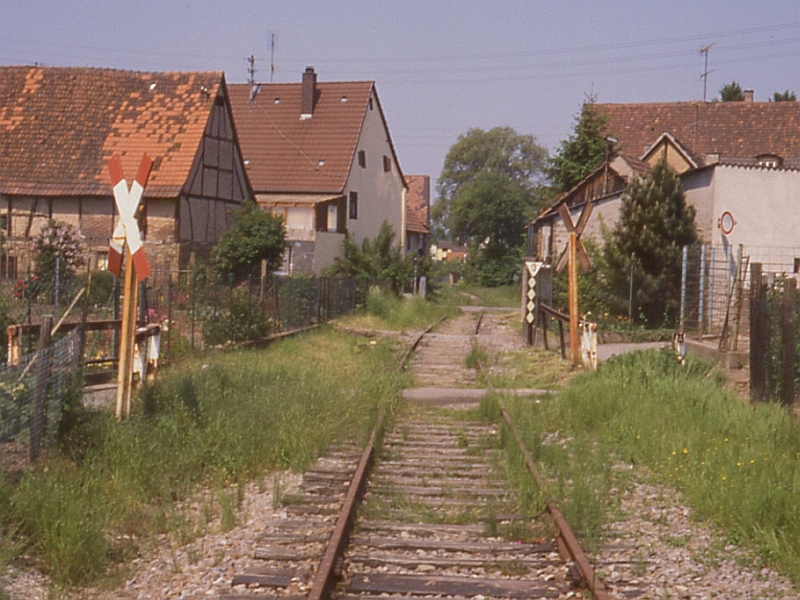
Former route of the line in Odenheim

=== The years under the BLEAG (1898–1931) ===
In October 1898, the WeEG operations on the Katzbach and the Kraich Valley Railways were transferred to its subsidiary, the Badische Lokal-Eisenbahnen Aktiengesellschaft (Baden Local Railway Company, BLEAG). An extension to Hilsbach was approved on 7 September 1899. However, the work required was very difficult because the terrain there was much hillier than between Bruchsal and Odenheim. Between Tiefenbach and Elsenz alone there was a height difference of about seventy metres. It was therefore necessary, for example, to build a three-span viaduct between Elsenz and Eichelberg. It was also necessary to demolish some houses in Odenheim for the extension.

On 3 September 1900, the Katzbach line was extended from Odenheim to Hilsbach, with the intention of continuing the line to Sinsheim, but this was never implemented. The Kraich Valley and the Katzbach Railways were the two most profitable lines operated by BLEAG in the early years of the twentieth century.

After the First World War, both lines were caught in a crisis because BLEAG had run out of funds for the maintenance of its lines. After the district of Karlsruhe agreed to contribute the funding of various BLEAG routes, the lines were temporarily saved. In subsequent years, normal operations were restored. In 1931, BLEAG had to file for bankruptcy during the Great Depression.

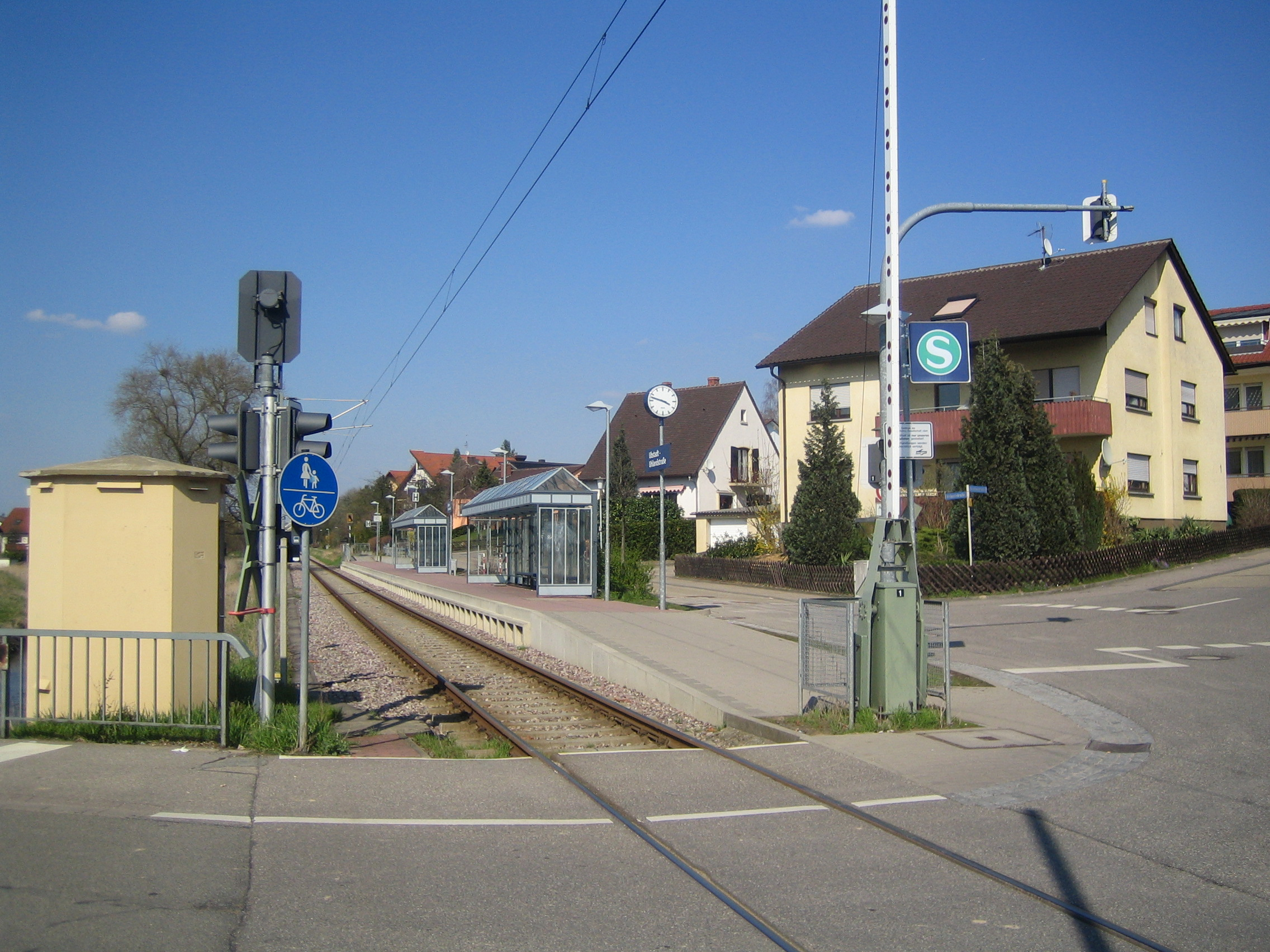
Ubstadt Uhlandstr. station

=== The years under the DEBG (1932–1963) ===
In the wake of the bankruptcy, both of the BLEAG lines in the Kraich Valley and the Katzbach were taken over by the German Railway Operating Company (Deutsche Eisenbahn-Betriebs-Gesellschaft, DEBG) on 1 January 1932. DEBG managed to restore operations on the two lines.

The outbreak of the Second World War meant that the passenger numbers increased significantly since private transport was restricted due to the war. Because of the fighting, however, operations had to be closed on 2 April 1945. Unlike the experience of many other rail lines, war damage on the two lines was limited. This allowed operations between Bruchsal and Odenheim to be resumed on 7 June 1945 and two weeks later to Hilsbach.

The steam locomotives and passenger carriages on the line, which were up to fifty years old, were gradually replaced by diesel haulage from the mid-1950s. Thus, in 1955, DEBG operated a diesel locomotive and, in 1956, six diesel railcar formerly owned by Deutsche Bundesbahn and built in 1936 and 1937. However, the DEBG applied on 7 July 1958 to close all of its tracks in southern Germany. This was resisted by the state of Baden-Württemberg, in particular.

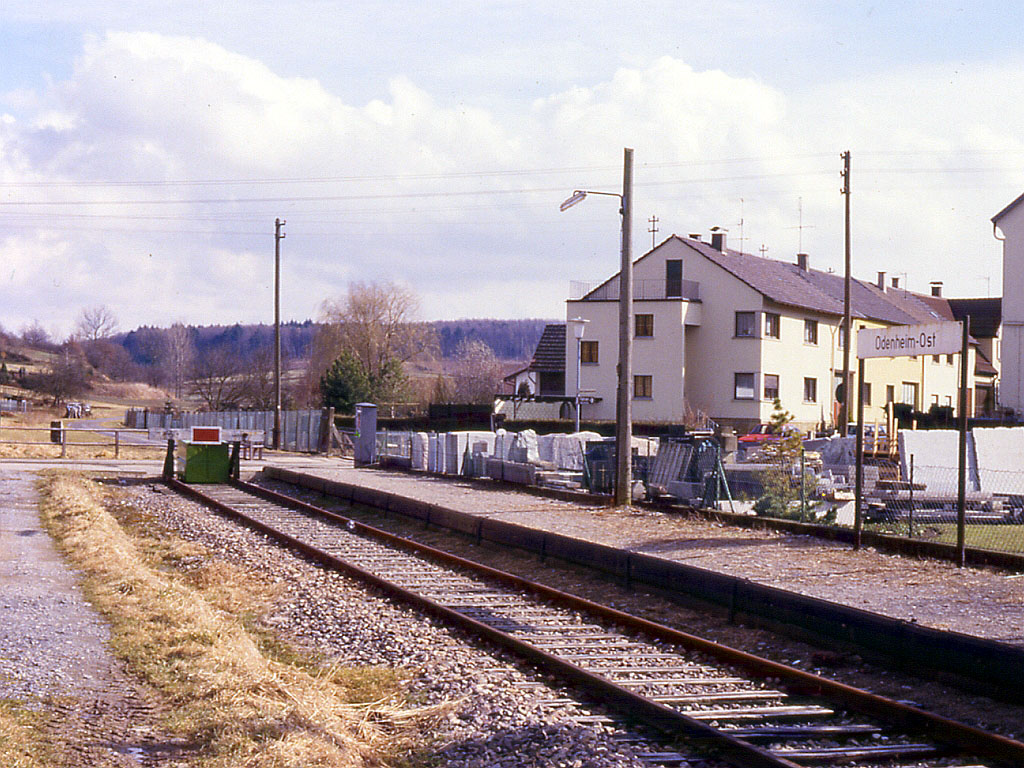
Odenheim Ost station in 1986

There was little passenger and freight traffic in the postwar years, especially between Tiefenbach and Hilsbach. On 1 October 1960, therefore passenger services were discontinued between Tiefenbach and Hilsbach and twelve days later, following a derailment, freight traffic was abandoned. The weak track meant that continued operations no longer made sense and in subsequent years the tracks were dismantled on the section.

=== The years under the SWEG (1963–1994) ===
DEBG transferred, with effect from 1 May 1963, both lines to the Südwestdeutsche Verkehrs-Aktiengesellschaft (Southwest German Railway Company, SWEG), which had been founded on 10 December 1962 by the state of Baden-Württemberg to preserve a number of private lines before they were closed. The SWEG sought to modernise the line. Thus, the remaining steam trains were replaced by diesel locomotives after the takeover. They also introduced improvements to the line, which also shortened the travel time significantly. As a result, a trip from Bruchsal to Tiefenbach took only 39 minutes compared to 48 minutes previously.

In 1968, Odenheim Ost station was opened to the east of Odenheim. Other additional stations that were opened on the Katzbach line in the following years were Ubstadt Nord (from the mid-1990s: Ubstadt Uhlandstraße), mainly serving the education centre in Ubstadt, Zeutern Ost and Odenheim Weberei (from 1977: Odenheim West).

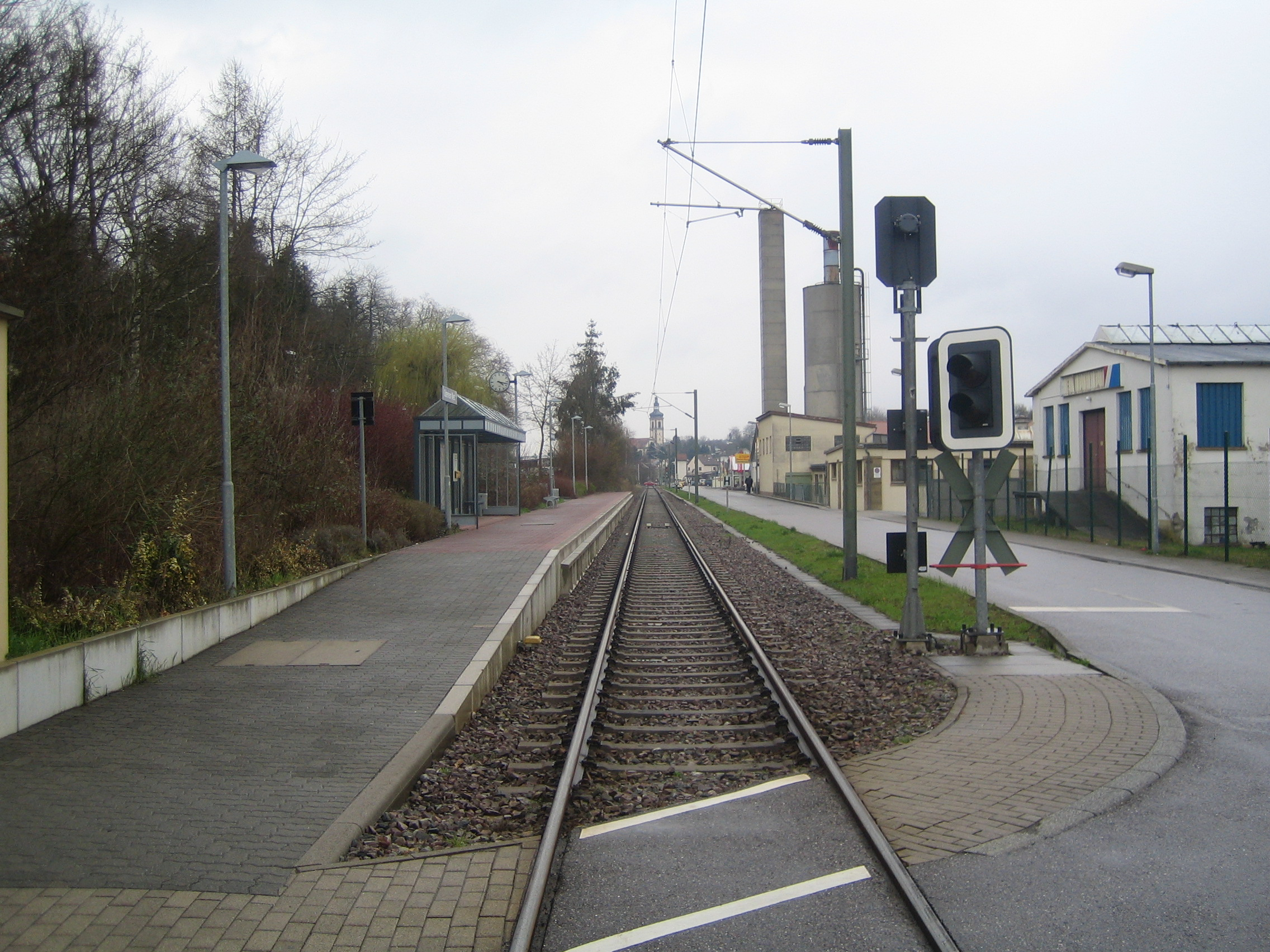
Odenheim West station

On 31 January 1975, the eastern section from Odenheim Ost to Tiefenbach was closed. Odenheim Ost station, which had only been established in 1968, thus became the new terminus of the line. Two platforms were built with at the opening of the station, which were on opposite sides of a level crossing, so the outer platform towards Tiefenbach was abandoned and the remaining platform was provided with a buffer.

From October 1981 services on the Katzbach line were strengthened by the introduction of class NE 81 diesel multiple units, which had been built by Waggon Union. However, the line was more and more under threat of total closure despite the modernisation carried out by SWEG. On 1 June 1986, the Odenheim–Odenheim Ost section was closed.

=== Acquisition by the AVG and upgrade for the Karlsruhe Stadtbahn (since 1994) ===
In order to preserve both the Katzbach and the neighbouring Kraichtal lines from total closure, the Albtal-Verkehrs-Gesellschaft (Alb Valley Transport Company, AVG) took over both sections from the SWEG in 1994. The line was originally operated with DMUs, including the class NE 81s that had been taken over from the SWEG. As part of the founding of the Karlsruher Verkehrsverbund (Karlsruhe Transport Association, KVV), the service on the Katzbach line was named line R 31.

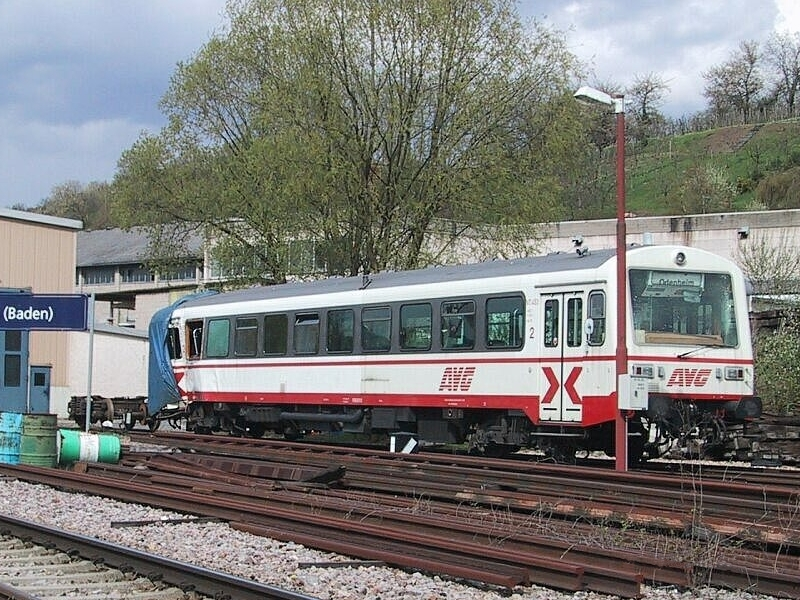
The accident in 1998 involved a NE 81

Initially the AVG services was operated under the most recent timetable of the SWEG, but six months later the AVG introduced a regular interval schedule, which had not existed previously. At the same time as the line was acquired by AVG, it was decided to upgrade the line to Stadtbahn standards. After the Stadtbahn operations were opened in 1996 on the Kraich Valley Railway, a few improvements were made to services on the Katzbach Railway, because more rolling stock was now available. Also associated with the opening of Stadtbahn services on the Kraich Valley Railway between Bruchsal and the Ubstadt Ort stations, two new stations were opened at Bruchsal Schlossgarten and Bruchsal Stegwiesen, which were then also included in the services on the Katzbach Railway.

In the summer of 1998, just months before the start of Stadtbahn operations, two diesel railcars (AVG VT VT 453 and 454) collided in Zeutern as one of the drivers had overlooked a signal.

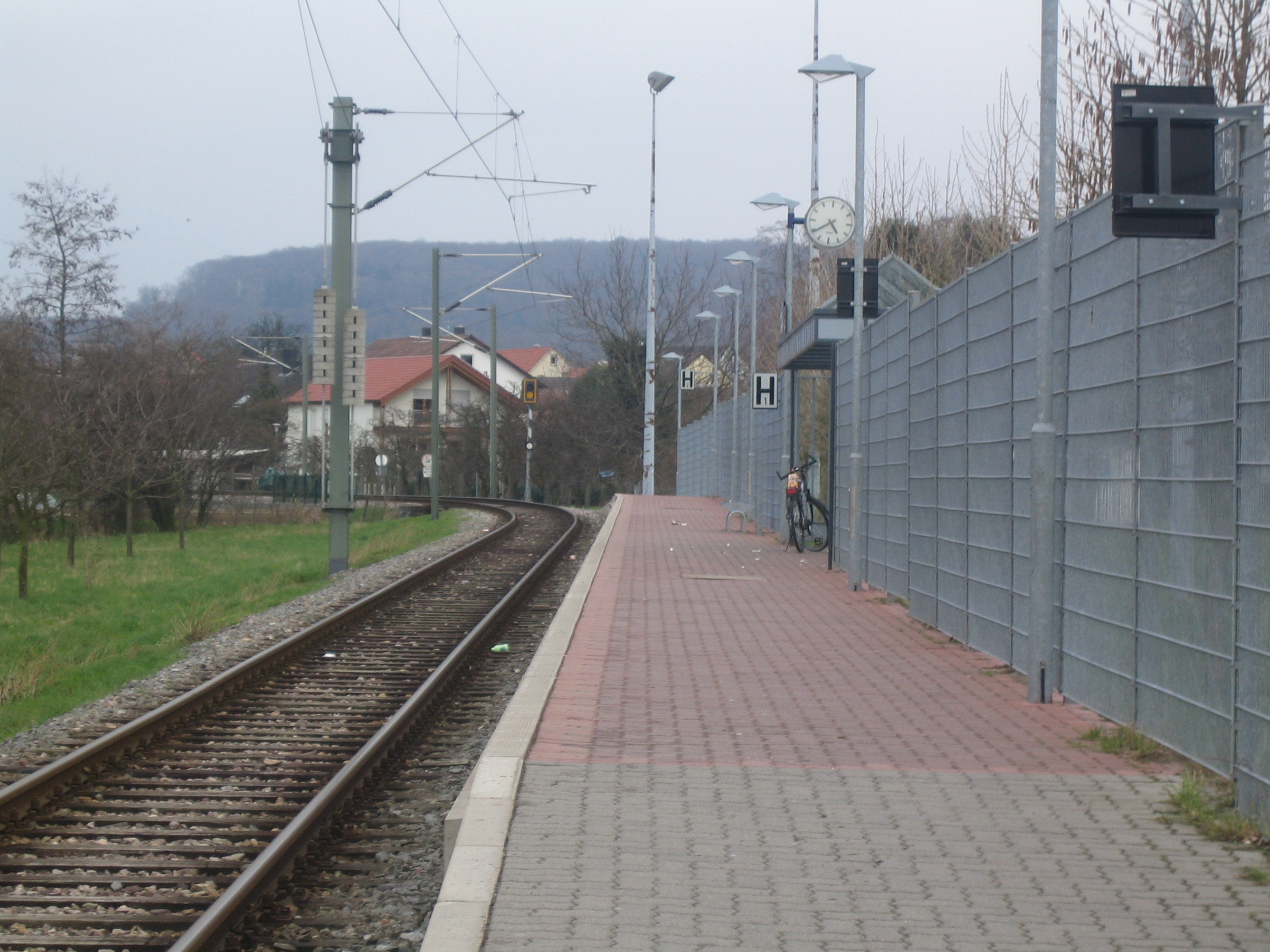
Zeutern Sportplatz station

On 26 September 1998, Stadtbahn operations commenced on the Katzbach Railway, which were then integrated into the network as line S 31 of the Karlsruhe Stadtbahn. Just two weeks earlier, Stadtbahn sets were deployed for student transport. Zeutern Sportplatz station was opened along with Stadtbahn operations. Above all, Odenheim station was completely rebuilt for the Stadtbahn: the station building was torn down and a depot was built.

Since not enough sets were available at the time of the opening of Stadtbahn operations for all services, a pair of services had to be operated by an Esslingen railbus, which was purchased from the SWEG; this was replaced after several years by Stadtbahn vehicles.

== Operations ==
=== Timetable ===
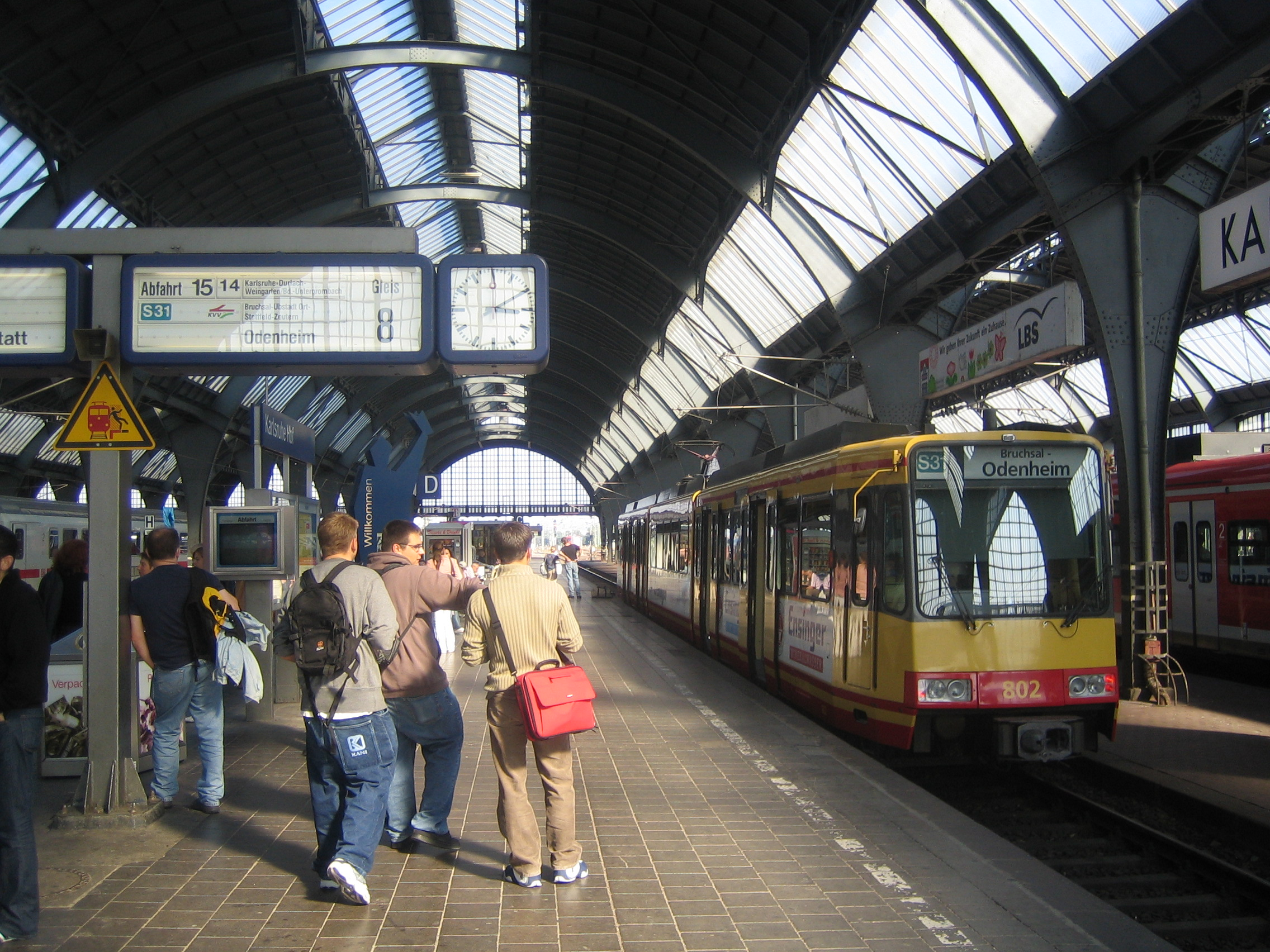
Stadtbahn service to Odenheim in Karlsruher Hbf.

The Katzbach Railway is operated as line S 31 (Odenheim–Bruchsal–Karlsruhe Central Station—Malsch–Rastatt–Freudenstadt) of the Karlsruhe Stadtbahn. Trains running instead to Forbach via Baden-Baden or Achern change line number to S 32 in Ubstadt Ort. During peak hours trains run at twenty-minute intervals, at other times they generally run hourly. Crossing opportunities exist in Ubstadt Ort, Stettfeld, Zeutern and Odenheim, while actual train crossings take place mainly in Zeutern and rather rarely in Stettfeld. All other stops on the Katzbach line are request stops. It is served by dual-system Stadtbahn vehicles operated by AVG.

Fares on the entire route are set by the Karlsruher Verkehrsverbund.

=== Platforms and station building ===
Bruchsal station and all stations from Ubstadt Uhlandstr. to Odenheim except Zeutern have a platform height of 55 centimetres, the other stations at Bruchsal Schlossgarten, Bruchsal Stegwiesen, Ubstadt Ort and Zeutern have a height of only 38 centimetres.

The station building in Odenheim was demolished during the upgrade of the line for the Stadtbahn. The station building in Zeutern has been preserved and is now used as a residence. In Stettfeld the old platform, the freight loading dock and goods shed were demolished along with the station building during the construction of a large residential complex.

== Sources ==
- Daniel Riechers (1996). Von der Nebenbahn zur Stadtbahn: 100 Jahre Bahn von Bruchsal nach Menzingen und Odenheim (in German). Ubstadt-Weiher: Verlag Regionalkultur. ISBN 3-929366-26-6.
- Hans-Wolfgang Scharf (2006). Die Eisenbahn im Kraichgau. Eisenbahngeschichte zwischen Rhein und Neckar (in German). Freiburg (Breisgau): EK-Verlag. ISBN 3-88255-769-9.
- Gerd Wolff, Hans-Dieter Menges (1992). Deutsche Klein- und Privatbahnen. Vol 2: Baden (in German). Freiburg: EK-Verlag. ISBN 3-88255-653-6.
- Peter-Michael Mihailescu, Matthias Michalke (1985). Vergessene Bahnen in Baden-Württemberg (in German). Stuttgart: Konrad Theiss Verlag. pp. 49–51. ISBN 3-8062-0413-6.
