= Odenheim station =

Railway station in Östringen, Germany

Odenheim
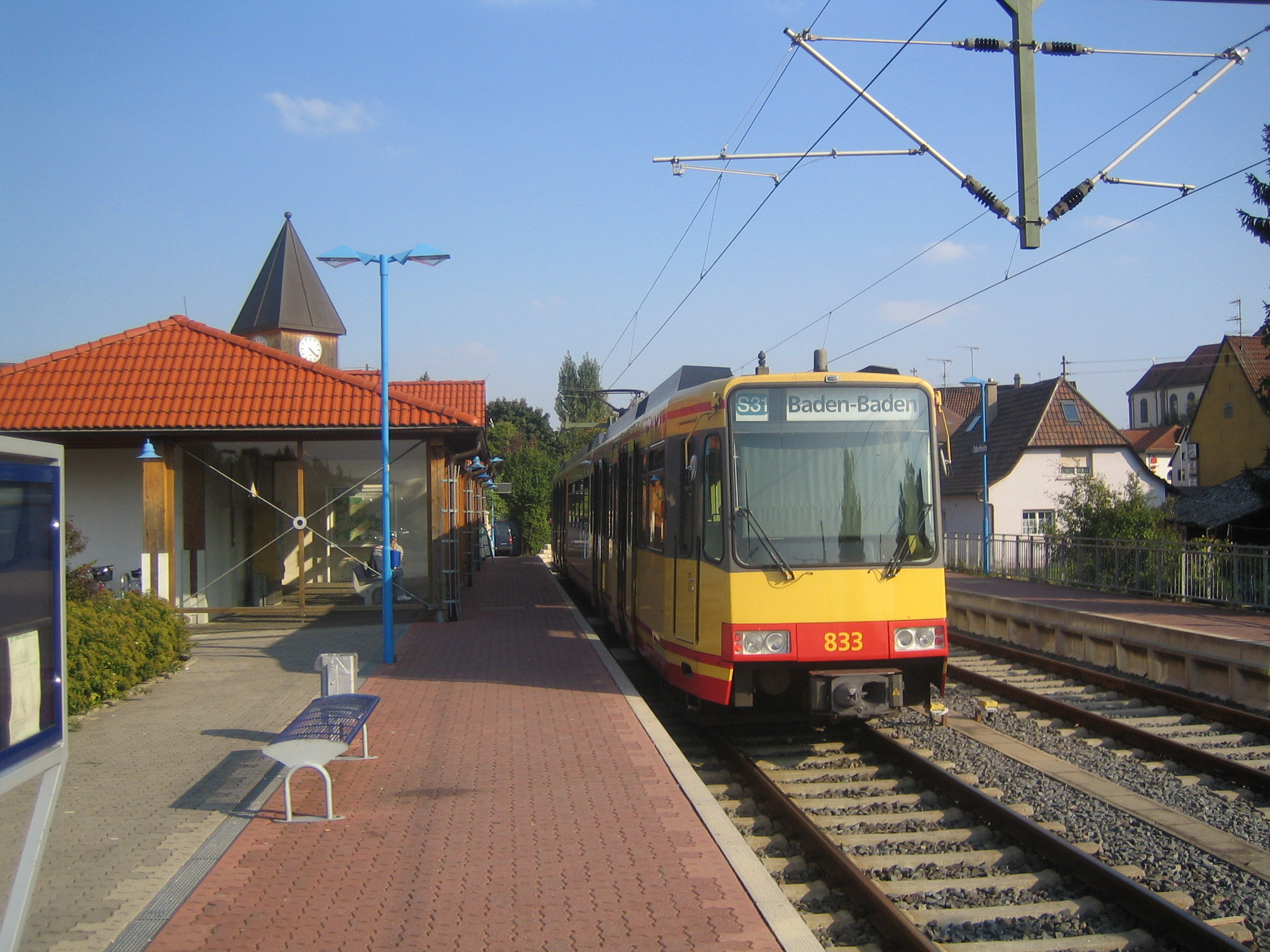
- Stadtbahn set on line S31 in Odenheim station

General information
- Location: Odenheim, Baden-Württemberg; Germany
- Coordinates: 49°10′44″N 8°44′47″E
- Line: Katzbach Railway (km 15.2)
- Tracks: 2

Other information
- Station code: n/a
- DS100 code: RODH
- IBNR: 8007138
- Fare zone: KVV: 266

History
- Opened: 5 March 1896

Services
| Preceding station | Karlsruhe Stadtbahn | Following station |
|---|---|---|
| Odenheim West towards Karlsruhe Hbf | S 31 | Terminus |
Location

Odenheim station is the station of Östringen district of the Odenheim. It is the terminus of the Katzbach Railway (Katzbachbahn) running from Bruchsal to Odenheim and is served by line S31 of the Karlsruhe Stadtbahn.

== History ==
After various plans had been developed since 1888, Odenheim station was opened as the terminus of the Katzbach Railway from Bruchsal to Odenheim on 5 March 1896. The line was built by the Westdeutsche Eisenbahn-Gesellschaft (West German Railway Company, WeEG).

In the first years of operation, both passenger and the freight traffic developed positively, which led to the original line being extended from 3 September 1900 from Odenheim to Hilsbach. In October 1898, the WeEG operations on the Katzbach Railway and the Kraich Valley Railway (Kraichtalbahn) were transferred to its subsidiary, the Badische Lokal-Eisenbahnen Aktiengesellschaft (Baden Local Railway Company, B.L.E.A.G.).

In the wake of the bankruptcy of the B.L.E.A.G., the Katzbach Railway was acquired by the German Railway Operating Company (Deutsche Eisenbahn-Betriebs-Gesellschaft, DEBG) on 1 January 1932. DEBG managed to restore operations on the two lines that had closed due to the effects of the Great Depression.

=== The years under the SWEG (1963–1994) ===
DEBG transferred, with effect from 1 May 1963, both lines to the Südwestdeutsche Verkehrs-Aktiengesellschaft (Southwest German Railway Company, SWEG).

The eastern section from Odenheim Ost to Tiefenbach was closed on 31 January 1975. Odenheim Ost station, which had only been established in 1968, thus became the new terminus of the line. On 1 June 1986, the Odenheim–Odenheim Ost section was closed.

=== Acquisition by the AVG and upgrade for the Karlsruhe Stadtbahn (1994–2000) ===
In order to preserve both the Katzbach and the neighbouring Kraichtal lines from total closure, the Albtal-Verkehrs-Gesellschaft (Alb Valley Transport Company, AVG) took over both sections from the SWEG in 1994.

Initially the AVG services was operated under the most recent timetable of the SWEG, but six months later the AVG introduced a regular interval schedule. At the same time as the line was acquired by AVG, it was decided to upgrade the line to Stadtbahn standards.

On 26 September 1998, Stadtbahn operations commenced on the Katzbach Railway, which were then integrated into the network as line S 31 of the Karlsruhe Stadtbahn.

Odenheim station was completely rebuilt for Stadtbahn operations. The station was demolished and a car shed was built for the Stadtbahn vehicles. In addition, the platforms were raised to a height of 55 centimetres and two platform tracks were built in the station, each with a buffer stop.

== Rail services ==
The Katzbach Railway is served by Stadtbahn lines S31 (Odenheim–Bruchsal–Karlsruhe Hbf–Malsch–Rastatt–Forbach–Freudenstadt Hbf). Trains that instead of running towards Forbach/Freudenstadt run to Baden-Baden or Achern, change their route number in Ubstadt Ort to S32. During peak hours, S31 services run at twenty-minute intervals, at other times they generally run hourly. It is served by dual-system Stadtbahn vehicles (class GT8-100C/2S).
