= Kraich Valley Railway =

Railway in southwestern Germany

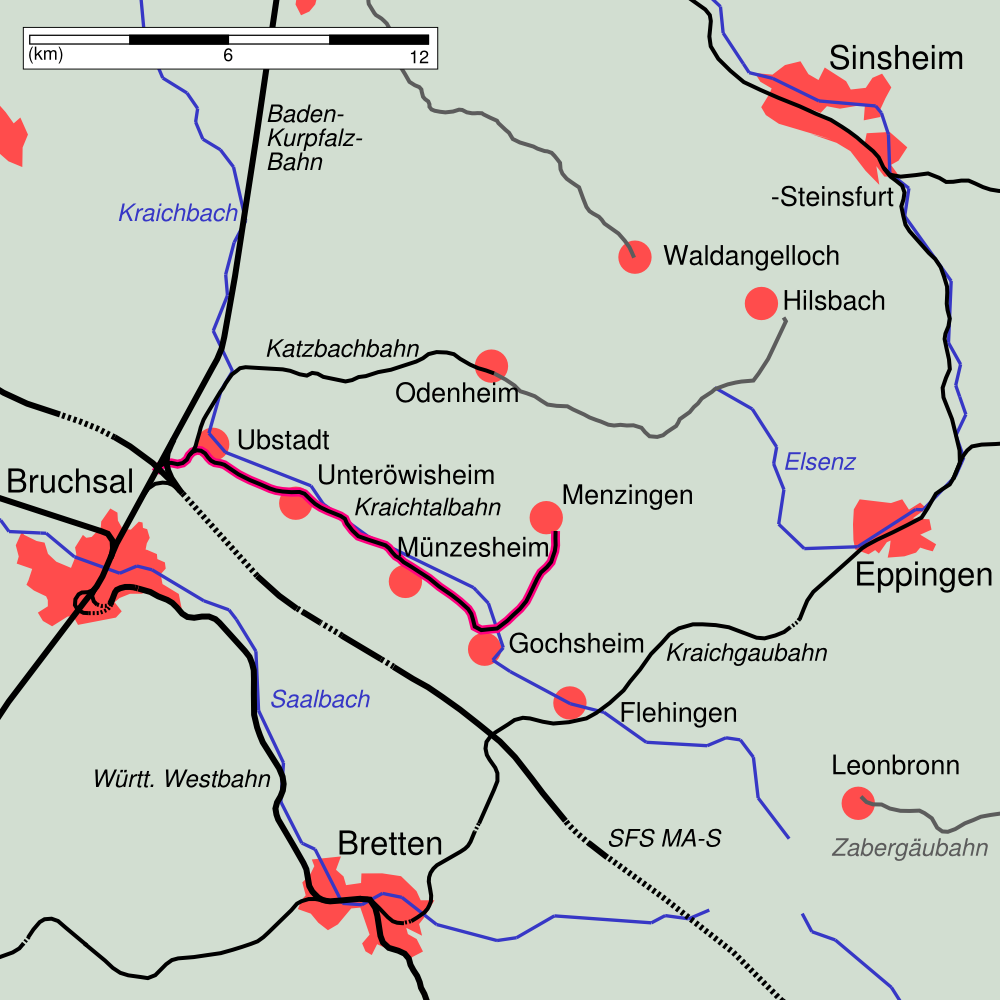

Overview
- Native name: Kraichtalbahn
- Line number: 9412 (Bruchsal–Ubstadt); 9413 (Ubstadt–Menzingen)
- Locale: Baden-Württemberg
- Termini: Bruchsal station 49°07′28″N 8°35′25″E; Menzingen station 49°08′10″N 8°46′31″E

Service
- Route number: 710.3

Technical
- Line length: 19.2 km (11.9 mi)
- Track gauge: 1,435 mm (4 ft 8 1/2 in) standard gauge
- Electrification: 15 kV/16.7 Hz AC Overhead catenary

The Kraich Valley Railway (German: Kraichtalbahn) is a branch line in southwestern Germany running from Bruchsal to Menzingen. It is now integrated as line 32 of the Karlsruhe Stadtbahn.

== Route ==
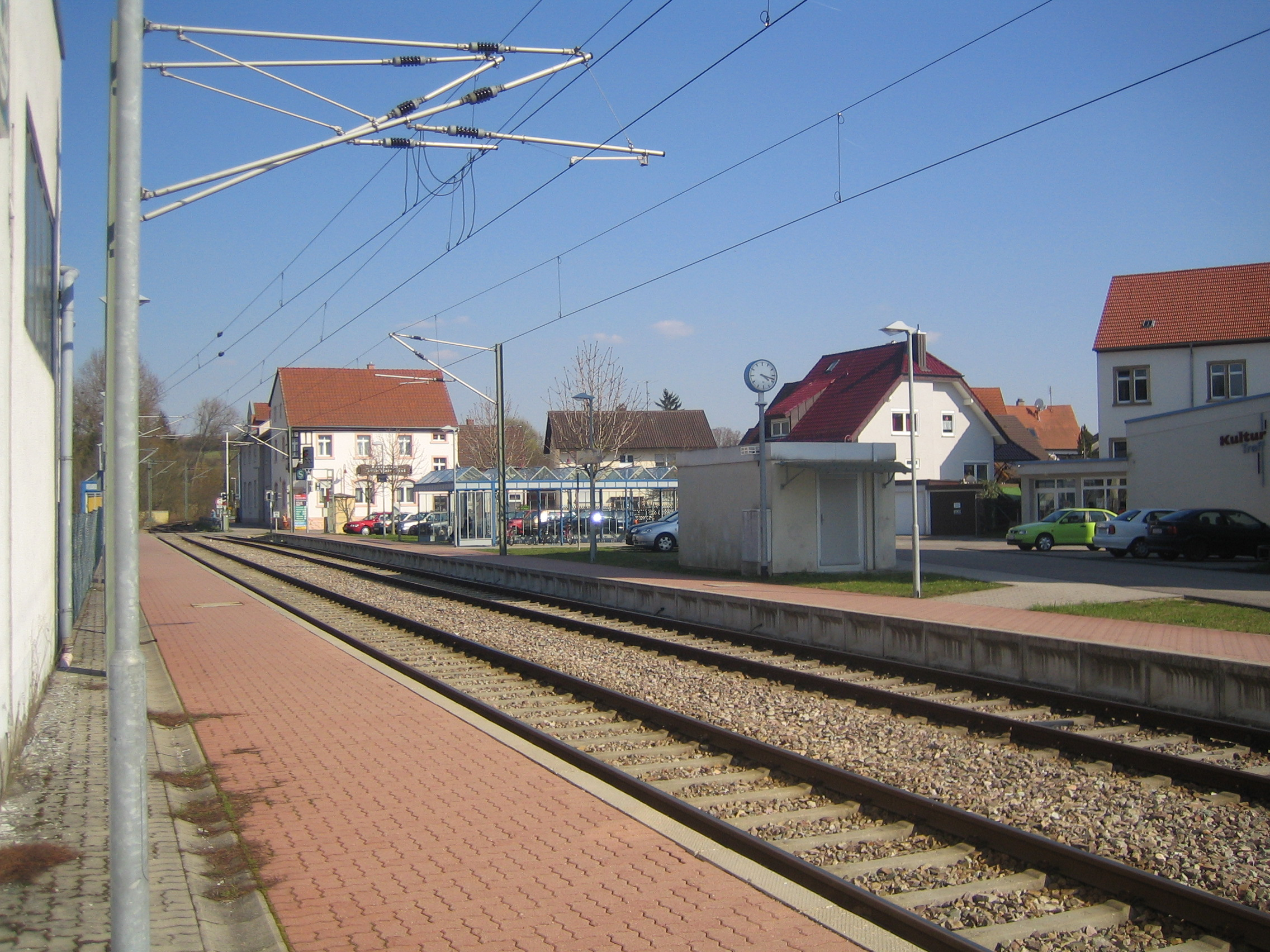
Unteröwisheim station

The Kraich Valley Railway runs from Bruchsal in the Kraichgau. Its name is derived from the Kraichbach stream, whose course it follows from Ubstadt to Gochsheim, as well as the town of Kraichtal, to which all the settlements on the line belong apart from Bruchsal and Ubstadt. It lies entirely within the district of Karlsruhe.

Because the railway line largely follows the aforementioned river valley there are no large structures like tunnels or noteworthy bridges.

== History ==
=== Planning and opening of the line ===
During the time up to 1874 when the city of Bruchsal became a railway hub, the municipalities along the Kraichbach were interested in obtaining a connection to the railway. Therefore, Bruchsal sought a railway in the Kraichbach valley through the towns of Ubstadt, Unteröwisheim, Oberöwisheim, Münzesheim and Gochsheim to Eppingen. However, the opening of the Kraichgau Railway on the Karlsruhe–Bretten–Eppingen route in 1879 delayed the construction of such a line.

In 1888, Bruchsal took the initiative in 1888 to build, along with the municipalities in the Kraichbach and the Katzbach valleys, a narrow gauge branch line with two branches, separating in Ubstadt. The northern line would run through Odenheim to Elsenz and the southern branch up the Kraichbach valley to Gochsheim.

Originally planned to run only as far as Gochsheim, it was finally decided to extend the line out of the Kraichbach valley to Menzingen. At the same time, it was also decided that the line would be built at standard gauge.

On 5 March 1896, the Kraich Valley Railway was opened together with the Katzbach Railway. The line was initially operated by the Westdeutsche Eisenbahn-Gesellschaft (West German Railway Company, WeEG).

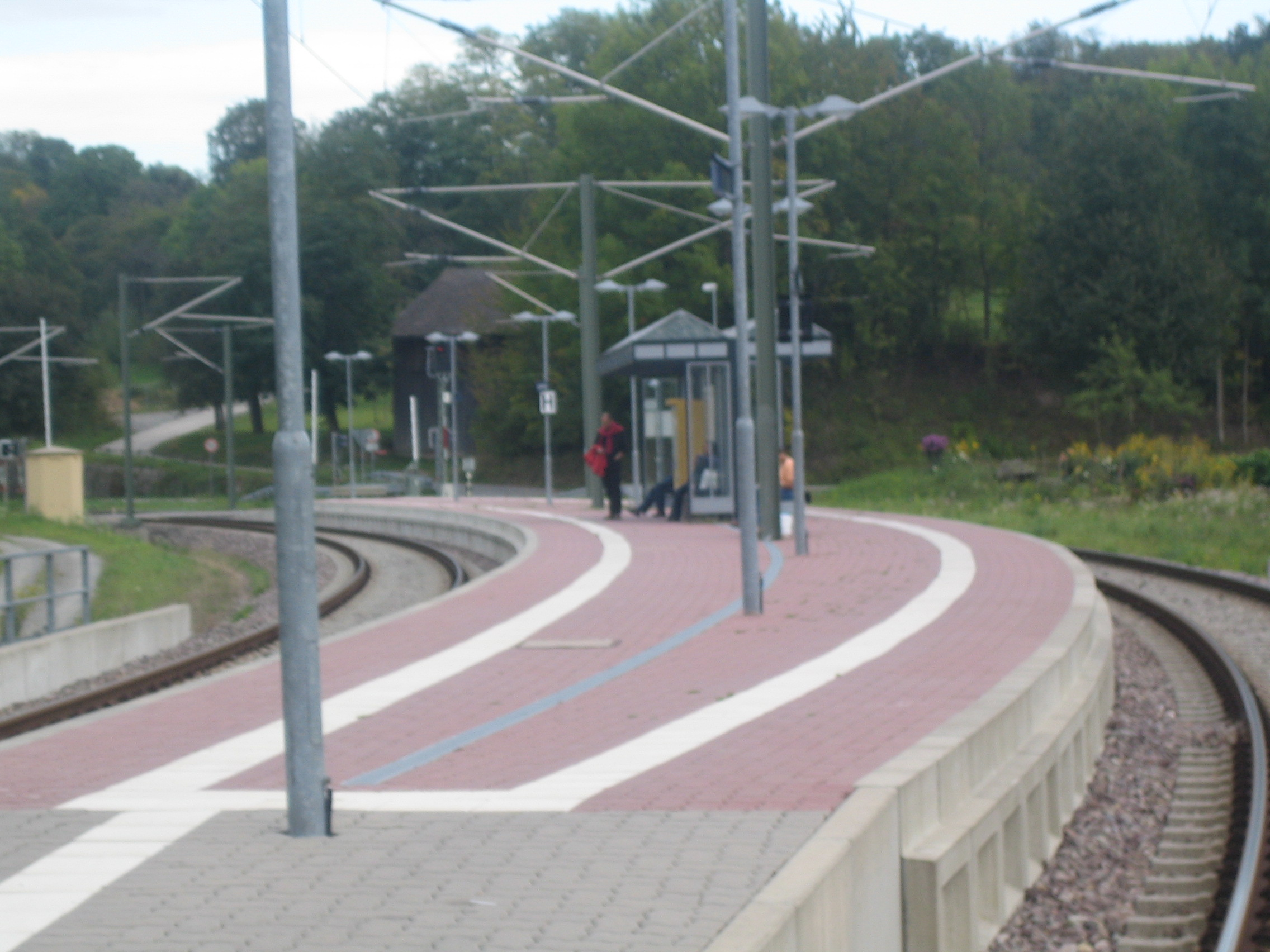
Gochsheim station after its reconstruction as a crossing station

=== The years under the BLEAG (1898–1931) ===
In October 1898, the WeEG operations on the Katzbach and the Kraich Valley Railways were transferred to its subsidiary, the Badische Lokal-Eisenbahnen Aktiengesellschaft (Baden Local Railway Company, BLEAG). In the first years of operations, there was a high level of passenger traffic and some growth in freight traffic. The Kraich Valley and the Katzbach Railways were the two most profitable lines operated by BLEAG in the early years of the twentieth century.

After the First World War, both lines were caught in a crisis because BLEAG had run out of funds for the maintenance of its lines. After the district of Karlsruhe agreed to contribute to the funding of various BLEAG routes, the lines were temporarily saved. In subsequent years, normal operations were restored. In 1931, BLEAG had to file for bankruptcy during the Great Depression.

=== The years under the DEBG (1931–1963) ===
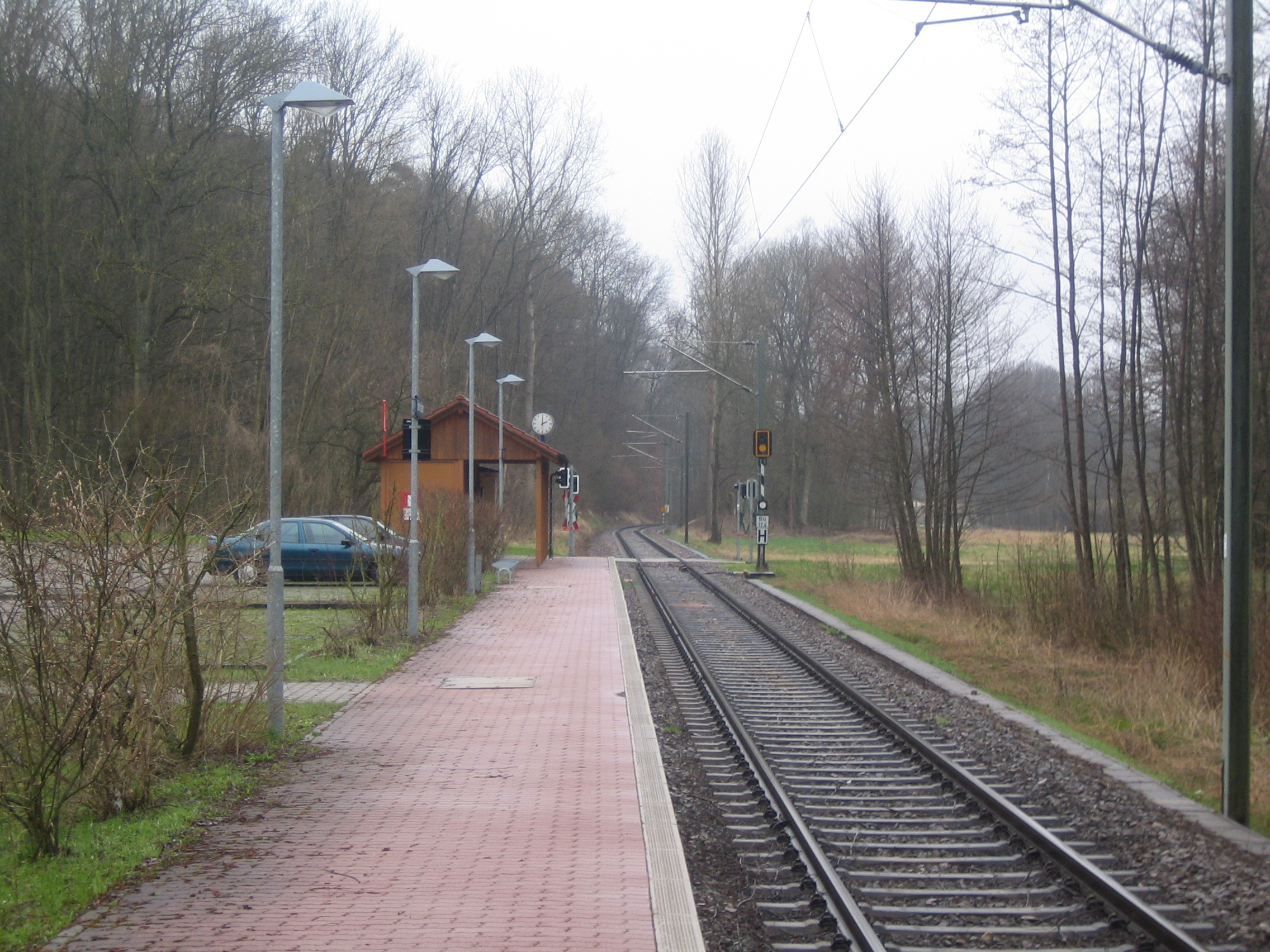
Bahnbrücken station

In the wake of the bankruptcy, both of the BLEAG lines in the Kraich Valley and the Katzbach were taken over by the German Railway Operating Company (Deutsche Eisenbahn-Betriebs-Gesellschaft, DEBG) on 1 January 1932. DEBG managed to restore operations on the two lines.

It also procured a diesel railcar, which was mainly used on the Kraich Valley Railway, since the most distant part of the Katzbach Railway between Odenheim and Hilsbach were too steep for this vehicle.

The outbreak of the Second World War meant that the passenger numbers increased significantly since private transport was restricted due to the war. Because of the fighting, however, operations had to be closed on 2 April 1945. Unlike the experience of many other rail lines, war damage on the two lines was limited. This allowed operations on the Kraich Valley Railway to be resumed on 7 June 1945.

The steam locomotives and passenger carriages on the line, which were up to fifty years old, were gradually replaced by diesel haulage from the mid-1950s. Thus, in 1955, DEBG operated a diesel locomotive and, in 1956, six diesel railcar formerly owned by Deutsche Bundesbahn and built in 1936 and 1937. However, the DEBG applied on 7 July 1958 to close all of its tracks in southern Germany. This was resisted by the state of Baden-Württemberg, in particular.

=== The years under the SWEG (1963–1994) ===
DEBG transferred, with effect from 1 May 1963, both lines to the Südwestdeutsche Verkehrs-Aktiengesellschaft (Southwest German Railway Company, SWEG), which had been founded on 10 December 1962 by the state of Baden-Württemberg to preserve a number of private lines before they were closed. The SWEG sought to modernise the line. Thus, the remaining steam trains were replaced by diesel locomotives after the takeover. It also introduced improvements to the line, which also shortened the travel time significantly. As a result, a trip from Bruchsal to Menzingen took only 37 minutes compared to 47 minutes previously.

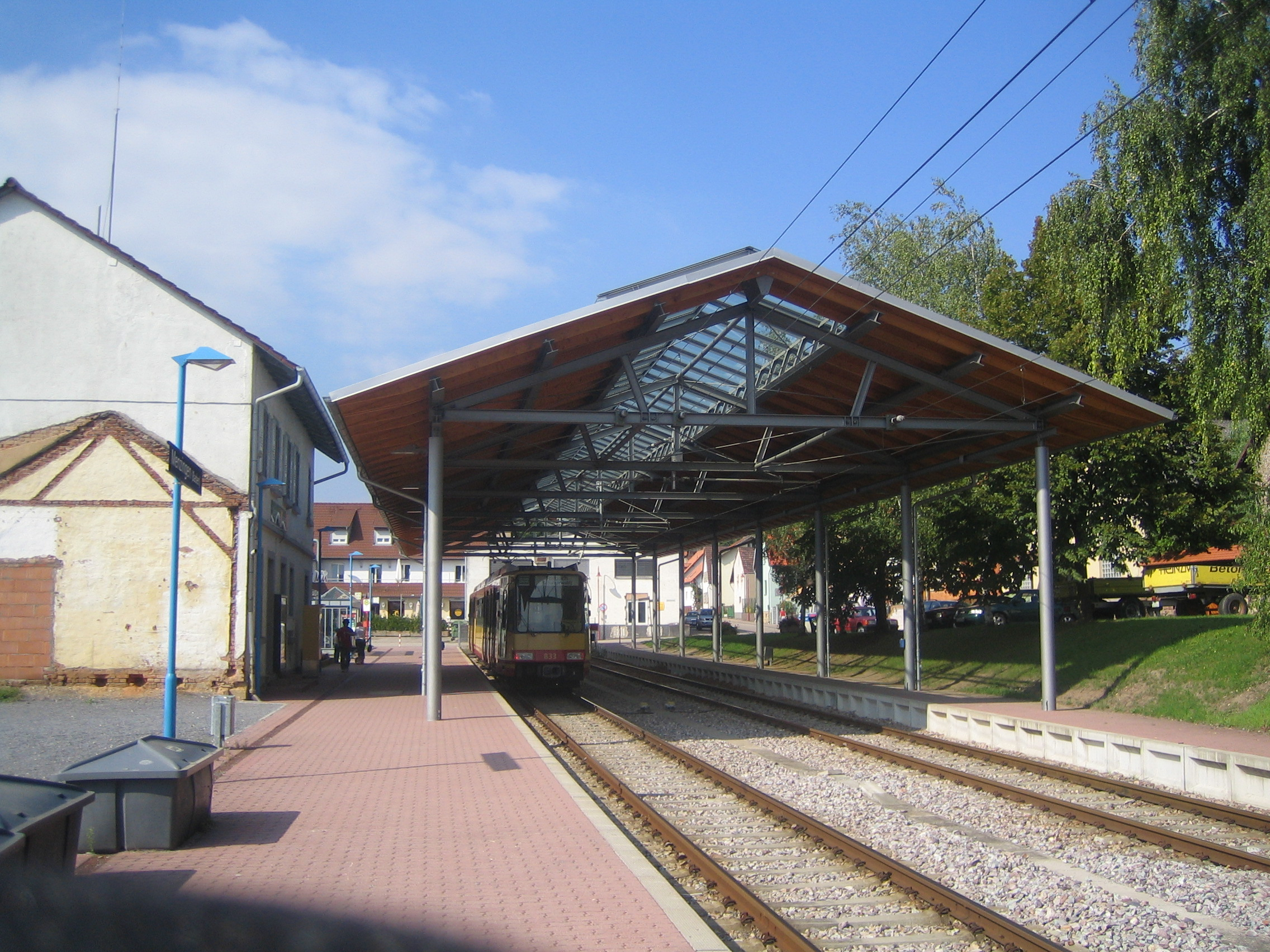
Menzingen station

In 1980, several new factories were established in Gochsheim, which led to a marked increase in freight traffic on the Kraich Valley Railway. The SWEG even had to buy a diesel locomotive to serve this market in 1982.

From October 1981, services were reinforced on the Kraich Valley Railway by class NE 81 diesel multiple units, which had been built by Waggon Union. However, the modernisation of the line by the SWEG did not increase traffic on the line. In the 1980s, the workshop facilities in Menzingen were expanded and modernised at a cost of millions of Deutsche Marks.

In the following years the Kraich Valley Railway was increasingly under threat of closure, as was the outer section of the Katzbach Railway from Odenheim to Hilsbach, which was closed in stages between 1960 and 1986.

=== Acquisition by the AVG and upgrade for the Karlsruhe Stadtbahn (since 1994) ===
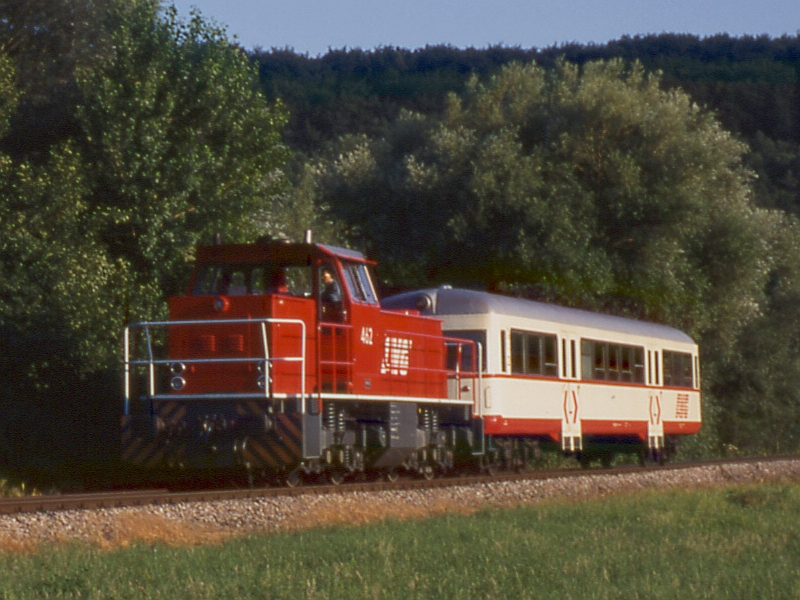
AVG locomotive 462 with an Esslingen carriage

In order to preserve the line from closure, the Albtal-Verkehrs-Gesellschaft (Alb Valley Transport Company, AVG) took over the line from the SWEG in 1994. Originally it operated the line with class NE 81 diesel multiple units that it had taken over from the SWEG or acquired from Maschinenfabrik Esslingen. Initially the AVG services was operated under the most recent timetable of the SWEG, six months later improvements were made that resulted in a regular interval timetable, which had not previously existed. As part of the founding of the Karlsruher Verkehrsverbund (Karlsruhe Transport Association, KVV), the service on the Katzbach Railway was named line R 32.

At the same time as the line was acquired by AVG, it was decided to upgrade the line to Stadtbahn standards. This included, among other things, the modernisation and electrification of the line and the construction of new stations. In March 1996, the Kraich Valley Railway and Katzbach Railway celebrated the centennial of the two lines. At this time, the Bruchsal–Ubstadt Ort section was already electrified, so Stadtbahn sets were operated between Bruchsal and Ubstadt as part of the celebrations.

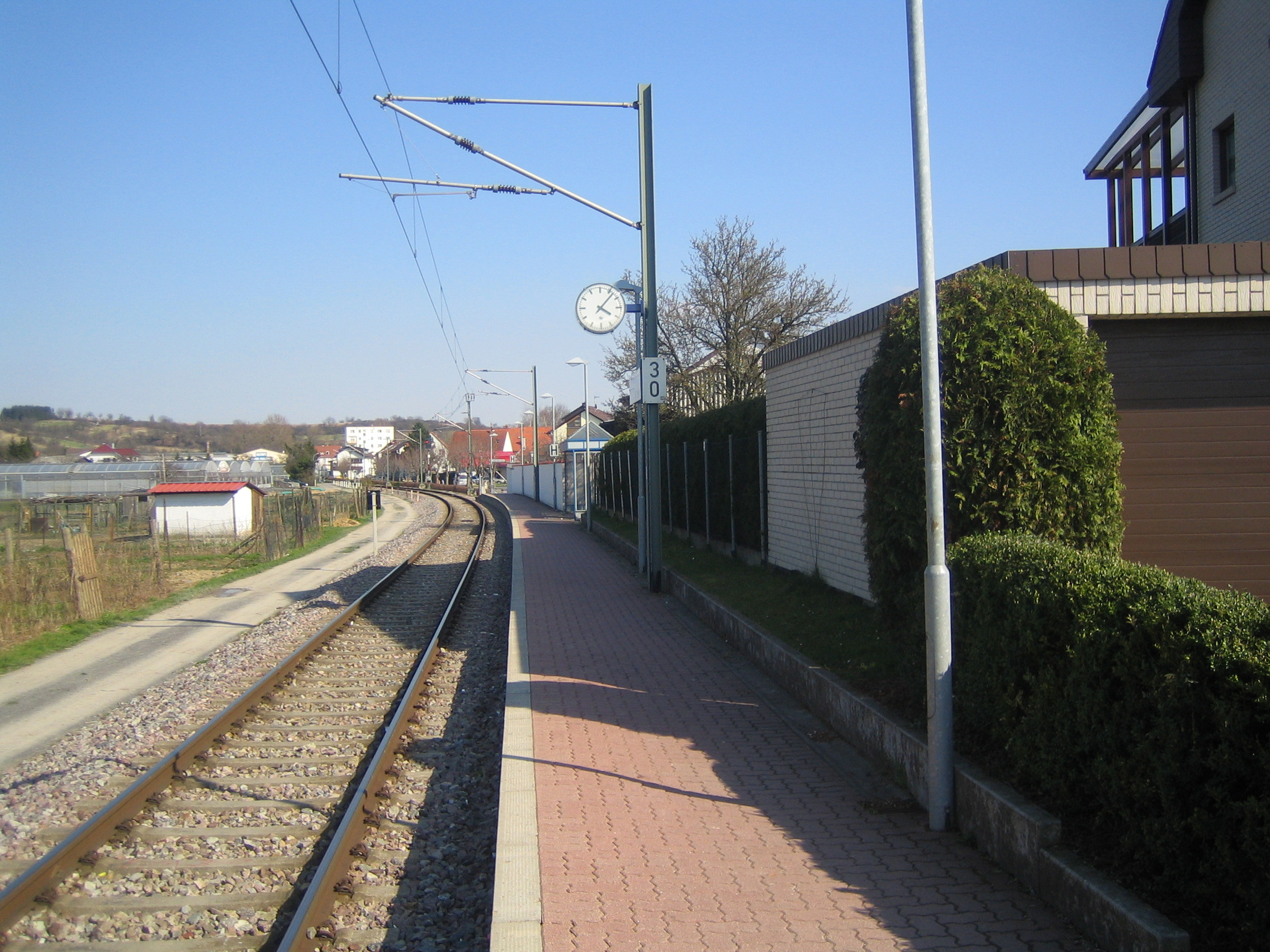
Unteröwisheim Martin-Luther-Str. station

In September 1996, the Kraich Valley Railway was finally incorporated into the operations of the Karlsruhe Stadtbahn. The Karlsruhe Stadtbahn line S 3, which has operated since 1994 from Karlsruhe Central Station to Bruchsal, was extended to Menzingen at the end of the Kraich Valley Railway. In preparation, the station platforms were raised and some of the station crossing loops were extended. In addition, a total of four new stations were established at Bruchsal Schlossgarten, Bruchsal Stegwiesen, Ubstadt Salzbrunnenstr. and Unteröwisheim Martin-Luther-Str.

At the opening of the Rhine-Neckar S-Bahn at the end of 2003, the Mannheim–Karlsruhe section of the Rhine Valley Railway was integrated into the S-Bahn network and has since been called line S 3. To avoid confusion, the former line S 3 serving the Kraich Valley Railway was renamed line S 32 at the same time. Gochsheim station was rebuilt with a crossing loop at the same time.

== Operations ==
=== General ===
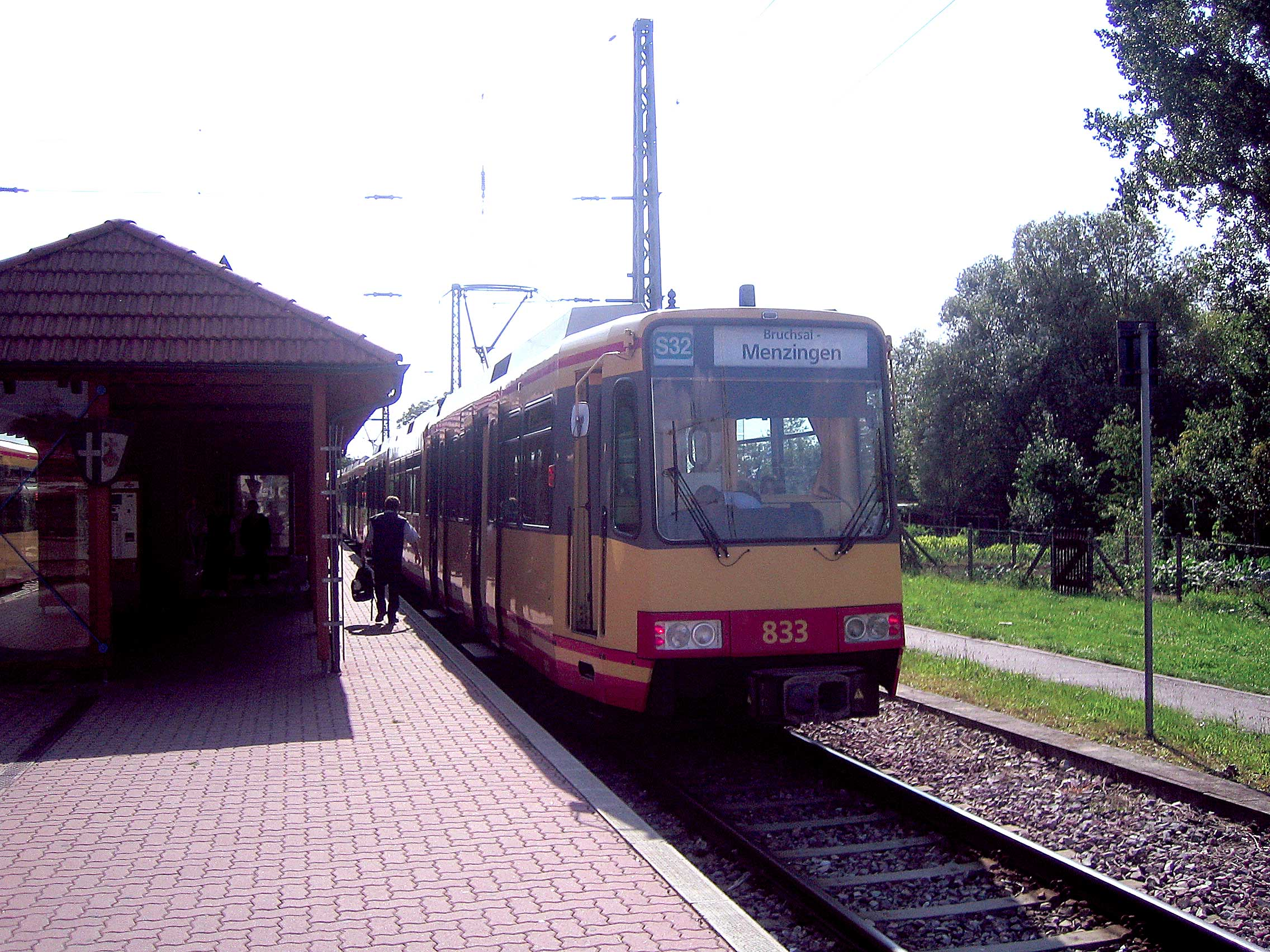
Ubstadt Ort station

Crossing opportunities exist in Ubstadt Ort and in the stations of Unteröwisheim, Münzesheim, Gochsheim and Menzingen, although these are rarely used in Unteröwisheim. The stations of Bruchsal, Münzesheim and Gochsheim have a platform height of 55 cm, the others are 38 cm high.

Gochsheim station building was demolished around 2000 during the construction of the crossing loop at the station. The same happened at Menzingen. Only the station building of Oberöwisheim still exists and it is now used as a residence.

=== Timetable ===
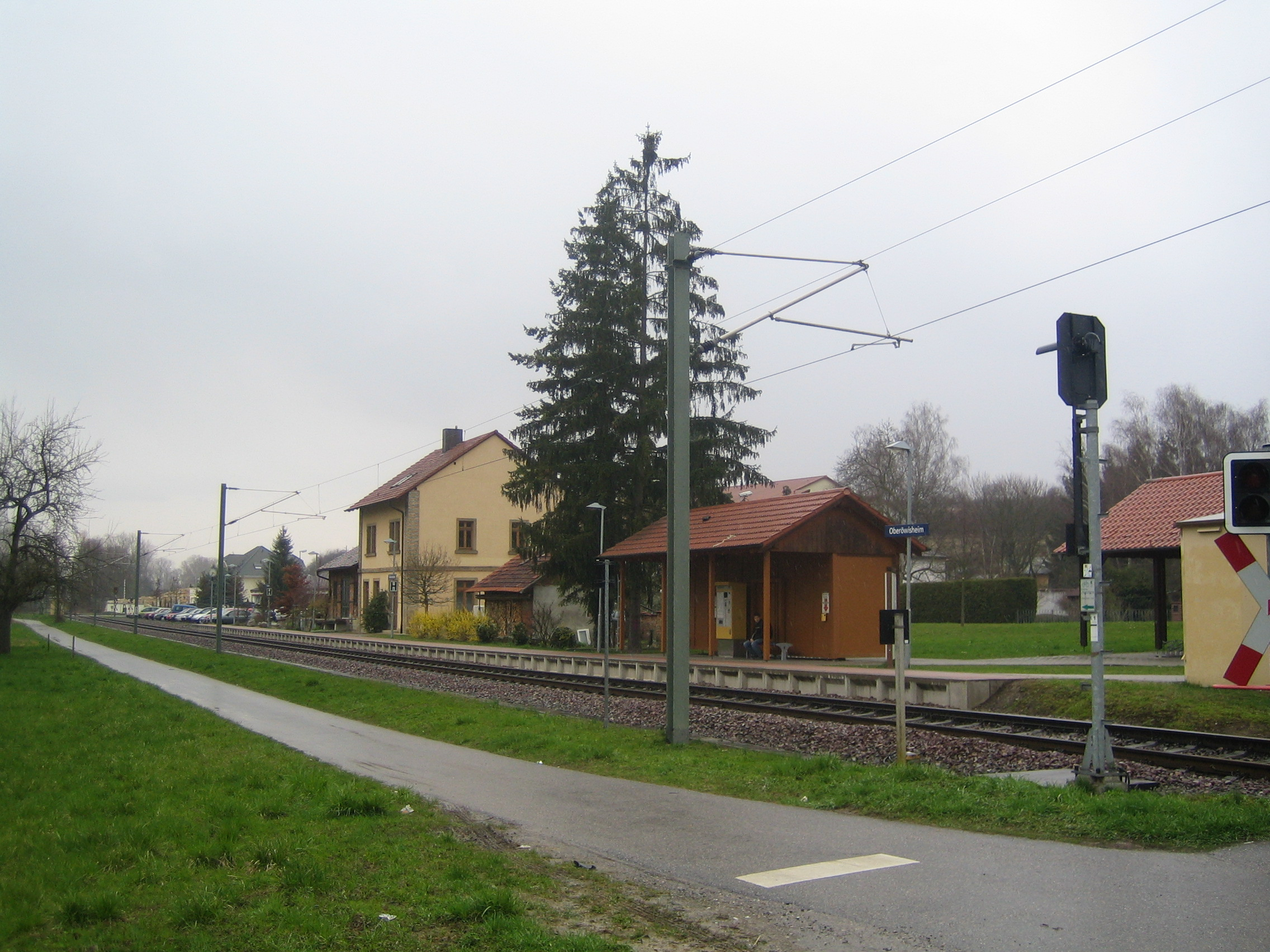
Oberöwisheim station

Services on the line are integrated as part of line S 32 (Menzingen–Bruchsal–Karlsruhe–Achern) of the Karlsruhe Stadtbahn network. It is operated at peak times at 20-minute intervals, otherwise, there are services at least hourly.

Services run through Karlsruhe Central Station (Hauptbahnhof) to Baden-Baden and Achern or to Freudenstadt over the Murg Valley Railway. The trains to the Murg Valley change their line designation in Ubstadt Ort station to line S 31, since this designation covers services on the Bruchsal–Freudenstadt route, whereas the designation S 32 applies to services to Achern. It is operated by dual-system Stadtbahn vehicles of the AVG.

Services running to Freudenstadt only use the AVG's GT8-100D/2S-M vehicles (numbered 837 to 922 and allowing level access at their central doors to 55 cm high platforms), since only they are allowed to operate over the steep route between Baiersbronn and Freudenstadt.

=== Freight ===
On the Kraich Valley Railway freight traffic runs to Gochsheim. The local freight siding branches off the line about five hundred metres west of the station. Another freight siding exists at Münzesheim Ost. The siding in Unteröwisheim is now closed. Until the conversion to Stadtbahn operations, Oberöwisheim station also had a freight siding, but this has now been removed.

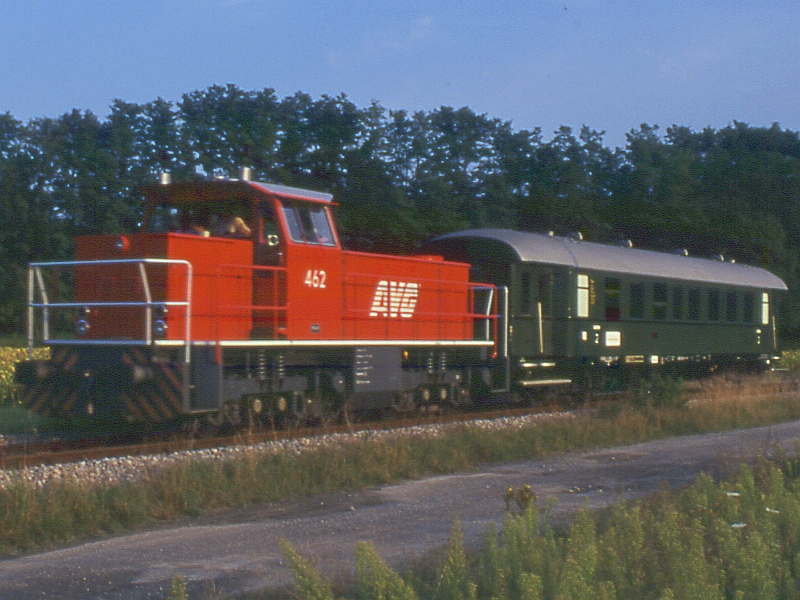
AVG locomotive 462 near Menzingen

The freight traffic is hauled by AVG diesel locomotives 462 and 464, which were built by Maschinenbau Kiel. Locomotive 462 was originally owned by the SWEG and was taken over by the AVG with its takeover of the line. During the time of the SWEG it had the number of 101 and sometimes it was also hauled passenger trains.

=== Buses ===
Along the Kraich Valley Railway there are four short bus routes connecting localities to the railway: line 135 Oberöwisheim–Neuenbürg, line 136 Münzesheim–Oberacker, line 137 Bahnbrücken station–Bahnbrücken Ort and line 138 Menzingen–Landshausen.

== Sources ==
- Daniel Riechers (1996). Von der Nebenbahn zur Stadtbahn: 100 Jahre Bahn von Bruchsal nach Menzingen und Odenheim (in German). Ubstadt-Weiher: Verlag Regionalkultur. ISBN 3-929366-26-6.
- Hans-Wolfgang Scharf (2006). Die Eisenbahn im Kraichgau. Eisenbahngeschichte zwischen Rhein und Neckar (in German). Freiburg (Breisgau): EK-Verlag. ISBN 3-88255-769-9.
- Gerd Wolff, Hans-Dieter Menges (1992). Deutsche Klein- und Privatbahnen, vol 2: Baden (in German). Freiburg: EK-Verlag. ISBN 3-88255-653-6.
