= Malsch =

- Municipality
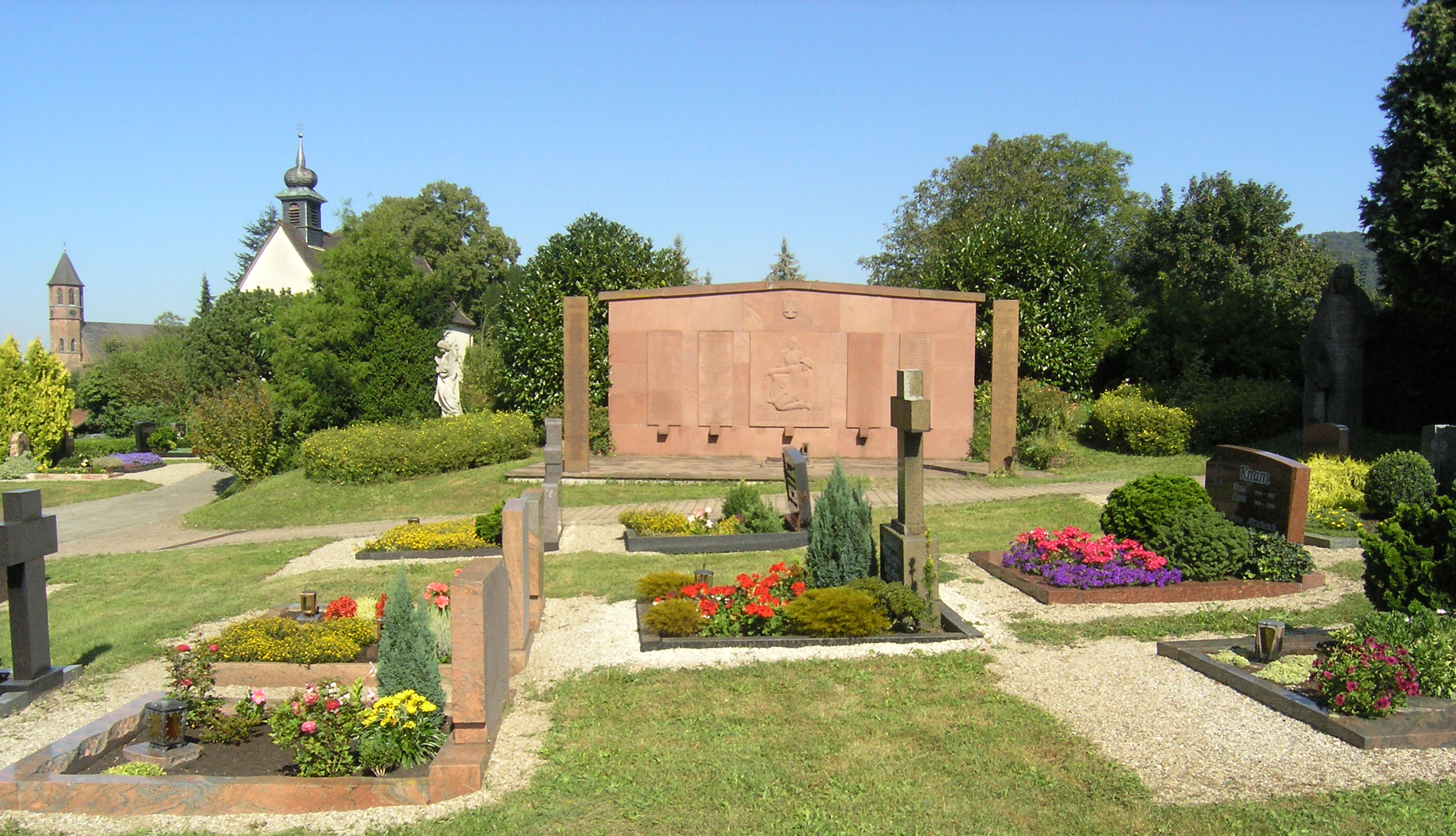
- Churches and cemetery of Malsch

- Coat of arms

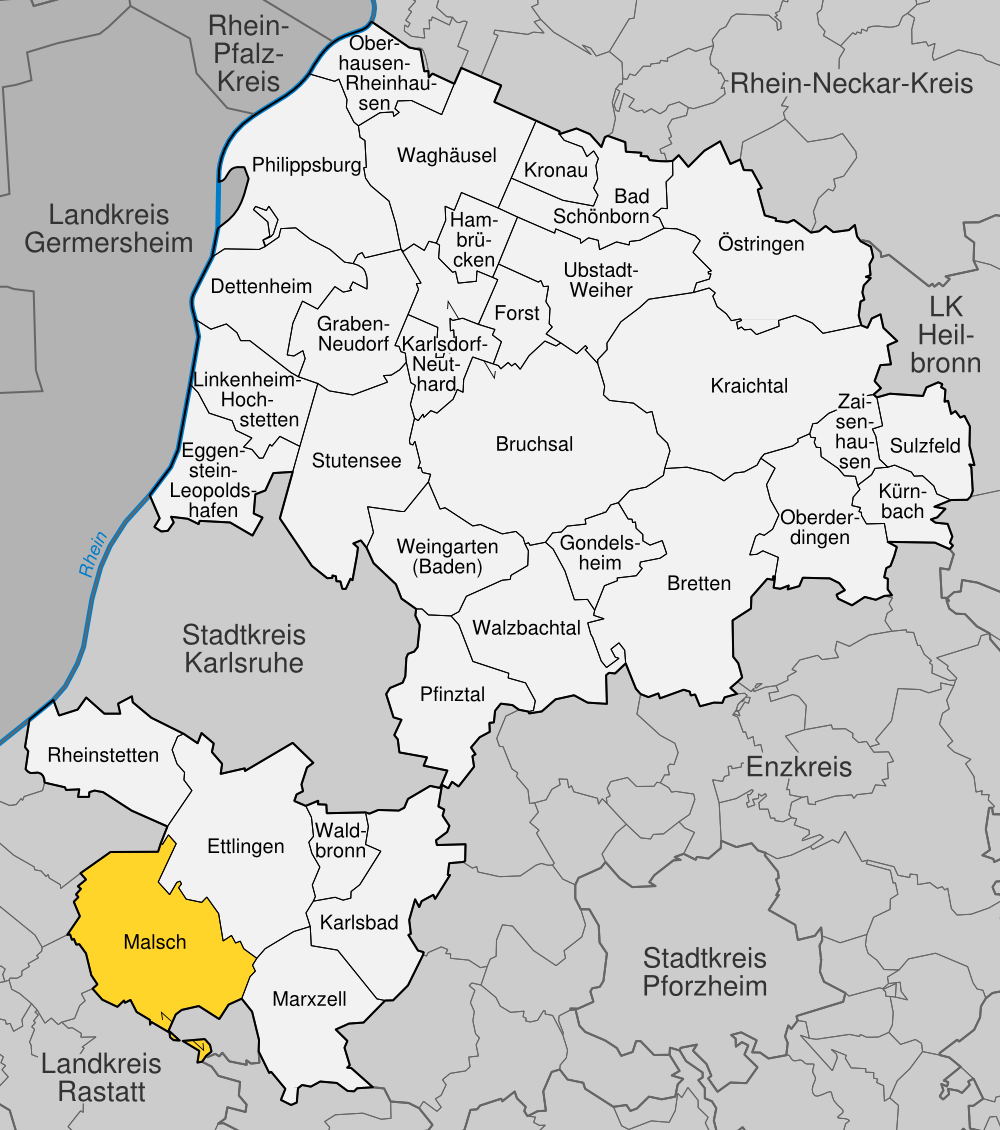
- Location of Malsch within Karlsruhe district
- Interactive map of Malsch
- Location within Germany Location within Baden-Württemberg
- Coordinates: 48°52′51″N 8°20′3″E
- Country: Germany
- State: Baden-Württemberg
- Admin. region: Karlsruhe
- District: Karlsruhe
- Subdivisions: 4

Government
  - Mayor (2021–29): Markus Bechler (Ind.)

Area
  - Total: 51.24 km^{2} (19.78 sq mi)
- Elevation: 145 m (476 ft)

Population (2025-12-31)
  - Total: 14,728
  - Density: 287.4/km^{2} (744.4/sq mi)
- Time zone: UTC+01:00 (CET)
  - Summer (DST): UTC+02:00 (CEST)
- Postal codes: 76316
- Dialling codes: 07246
- Vehicle registration: KA
- Website: www.malsch.de

Malsch (German pronunciation: [malʃ]) is a municipality in the district of Karlsruhe, in Baden-Württemberg, Germany. It is situated 15 km south of Karlsruhe, and 10 km east of Rastatt, at the eastern border of the Upper Rhine Plain.

Beside the main town, it consists of the incorporated villages Sulzbach, Waldprechtsweier and Völkersbach, the latter located higher in the Black Forest.

== Demographics ==
Population development:

Year	Inhabitants
1990	12.428
2001	13.993
2011	14.197
2021	14.616

View chart definition.
