= Bruchsal – Schwetzingen =

Electoral constituency represented in the Bundestag

278 Bruchsal – Schwetzingen
- Electoral district for the Bundestag
- Bruchsal – Schwetzingen in 2025
- State: Baden-Württemberg
- Population: 272,100 (2019)
- Electorate: 195,755 (2021)
- Major settlements: Bruchsal; Hockenheim; Schwetzingen
- Area: 506.6 km^{2}

Current electoral district
- Created: 2002
- Party: CDU
- Member: Olav Gutting
- Elected: 2002, 2005, 2009, 2013, 2017, 2021, 2025

Bruchsal – Schwetzingen is an electoral constituency (German: Wahlkreis) represented in the Bundestag. It elects one member via first-past-the-post voting. Under the current constituency numbering system, it is designated as constituency 278. It is located in northwestern Baden-Württemberg, comprising the northern part of the Landkreis Karlsruhe district and western parts of the Rhein-Neckar-Kreis district.

Bruchsal – Schwetzingen was created for the 2002 federal election. Since 2002, it has been represented by Olav Gutting of the Christian Democratic Union (CDU).

== Geography ==
Bruchsal – Schwetzingen is located in northwestern Baden-Württemberg. As of the 2021 federal election, it comprises the municipalities of Bad Schönborn, Bruchsal, Forst, Hambrücken, Karlsdorf-Neuthard, Kronau, Oberhausen-Rheinhausen, Östringen, Philippsburg, Ubstadt-Weiher, and Waghäusel from the Landkreis Karlsruhe district and the municipalities of Altlußheim, Brühl, Hockenheim, Ketsch, Neulußheim, Oftersheim, Plankstadt, Reilingen, and Schwetzingen from the Rhein-Neckar-Kreis district.

== History ==
Bruchsal – Schwetzingen was created in 2002 and contained parts of the redistributed constituencies of Karlsruhe-Land and Heidelberg. In the 2002 and 2005 elections, it was constituency 279 in the numbering system. Since the 2009 election, it has been number 278. Its borders have not changed since its creation.

== Members ==
The constituency has been represented by Olav Gutting of the Christian Democratic Union (CDU) since its creation.

Election	Member	Party	%
2002	Olav Gutting	CDU	48.1
2005	Olav Gutting	CDU	48.7
2009	Olav Gutting	CDU	46.9
2013	Olav Gutting	CDU	51.8
2017	Olav Gutting	CDU	41.5
2021	Olav Gutting	CDU	29.6
2025	Olav Gutting	CDU	36.1

== Election results ==
=== 2025 election ===
Federal election (2025): Bruchsal – Schwetzingen
Notes:	Blue background denotes the winner of the electorate vote. Pink background denotes a candidate elected from their party list. Yellow background denotes an electorate win by a list member, or other incumbent. A ✓ or ✗ denotes status of any incumbent, win or lose respectively.						
Party	Candidate	Votes	%	±%	Party votes	%	±%
CDU	✓ Olav Gutting	57,953	36.1	▲6.5	51,746	32.1	▲6.3
AfD	Tobias Dammert	35,699	22.2	▲10.7	36,132	22.4	▲10.8
SPD	Nezaket Yildirim	26,193	16.3	▼5.5	23,130	14.4	▼8.5
Greens	Thomas Rink	17,222	10.7	▼4.0	17,612	10.9	▼2.9
Left	Mara Zeltmann	8,289	5.2	▲2.6	9,271	5.8	▲3.0
FDP	Christian Melchior	6,690	4.2	▼7.6	8,450	5.2	▼9.3
FW	Alexander Geyer	5,664	3.5	▲0.2	2,544	1.6	▼0.6
Tierschutzpartei					2,048	1.3	▼0.5
dieBasis				▼1.9	497	0.3	▼1.3
PARTEI				▼1.7	797	0.5	▼0.5
Team Todenhöfer							▼0.5
Volt	Elisa Hippert	2,759	1.7		1,258	0.8	▲0.4
Pirates							▼0.3
Gesundheitsforschung							▼0.2
ÖDP					217	0.1	0.0
Bürgerbewegung							▼0.4
Bündnis C					182	0.1	
BSW					7,009	4.3	
BD					208	0.1	
MLPD					35	0.0	0.0
Informal votes		1,641			973		
Total valid votes		160,469			161,137		
Turnout		162,110	83.5	▲5.7			
CDU hold	Majority			▲6.5			

=== 2021 election ===
Federal election (2021): Bruchsal – Schwetzingen
Notes:	Blue background denotes the winner of the electorate vote. Pink background denotes a candidate elected from their party list. Yellow background denotes an electorate win by a list member, or other incumbent. A ✓ or ✗ denotes status of any incumbent, win or lose respectively.						
Party	Candidate	Votes	%	±%	Party votes	%	±%
CDU	✓ Olav Gutting	44,465	29.6	▼11.9	38,866	25.8	▼9.0
SPD	Nezaket Yildirim	32,836	21.9	▲2.4	34,434	22.8	▲5.4
Greens	Nicole Heger	22,154	14.7	▲6.5	20,858	13.8	▲3.7
FDP	Christopher Gohl	17,635	11.7	▲5.0	21,978	14.6	▲2.7
AfD	Ruth Rickersfeld	17,352	11.6	▼2.9	17,462	11.6	▼3.3
FW	Alexander Geyer	5,054	3.4	▲1.5	3,258	2.2	▲1.1
Left	Alena Schmitt	3,854	2.6	▼2.0	4,125	2.7	▼2.9
Tierschutzpartei					2,726	1.8	▲0.5
dieBasis	Frank Theis	2,878	1.9		2,416	1.6	
PARTEI	Gerd Wolf	2,553	1.7	▲0.7	1,527	1.0	▲0.2
Independent	Jonas Fritsch	1,422	0.9				
Team Todenhöfer					680	0.5	
Volt					544	0.4	
Pirates					457	0.3	▼0.1
Gesundheitsforschung					257	0.2	
ÖDP					217	0.1	0.0
Bürgerbewegung					202	0.1	
Bündnis C					198	0.1	
NPD					193	0.1	▼0.2
Humanists					160	0.1	
DiB					103	0.1	▼0.1
Bündnis 21					51	0.0	
LKR					24	0.0	
MLPD					20	0.0	0.0
DKP					20	0.0	0.0
Informal votes		2,028			1,455		
Total valid votes		150,203			150,776		
Turnout		152,231	77.8	▼1.0			
CDU hold	Majority	11,629	7.7	▼14.3			

=== 2017 election ===
Federal election (2017): Bruchsal – Schwetzingen
Notes:	Blue background denotes the winner of the electorate vote. Pink background denotes a candidate elected from their party list. Yellow background denotes an electorate win by a list member, or other incumbent. A ✓ or ✗ denotes status of any incumbent, win or lose respectively.						
Party	Candidate	Votes	%	±%	Party votes	%	±%
CDU	✓ Olav Gutting	63,166	41.5	▼10.4	53,147	34.8	▼11.8
SPD	Nezaket Yildirim	29,684	19.5	▼5.2	26,560	17.4	▼4.2
AfD	Dieter Amann	21,960	14.4	▲10.0	22,794	14.9	▲8.8
Greens	Danyal Bayaz	12,641	8.3	▲1.5	15,500	10.2	▲2.0
FDP	Hendrik Tzschaschel	10,255	6.7	▲4.0	18,180	11.9	▲6.2
Left	Werner Zieger	7,016	4.6	▲0.9	8,674	5.7	▲1.2
Tierschutzpartei	Nicola Zimmermann	2,991	2.0		2,045	1.3	▲0.3
FW	Marianne Schammert	2,824	1.9	▲0.6	1,667	1.1	▲0.1
PARTEI	Victor Gogröf	1,498	1.0		1,289	0.8	
Pirates					543	0.4	▼2.1
NPD					470	0.3	▼0.8
Tierschutzallianz					354	0.2	
ÖDP					235	0.2	0.0
Menschliche Welt					229	0.1	
DiB					216	0.1	
DM					214	0.1	
V-Partei³					192	0.1	
BGE					176	0.1	
DIE RECHTE	Reinhard Schätz	240	0.2		114	0.1	
MLPD					79	0.1	0.0
DKP					12	0.0	
Informal votes		2,264			1,932		
Total valid votes		152,358			152,690		
Turnout		154,622	78.7	▲4.7			
CDU hold	Majority	33,482	22.0	▼5.1			

=== 2013 election ===
Federal election (2013): Bruchsal – Schwetzingen
Notes:	Blue background denotes the winner of the electorate vote. Pink background denotes a candidate elected from their party list. Yellow background denotes an electorate win by a list member, or other incumbent. A ✓ or ✗ denotes status of any incumbent, win or lose respectively.						
Party	Candidate	Votes	%	±%	Party votes	%	±%
CDU	✓ Olav Gutting	73,944	51.8	▲5.0	66,656	46.6	▲10.6
SPD	Daniel Born	35,252	24.7	▲1.1	30,861	21.6	▲1.4
Greens	Alexander Geiger	9,678	6.8	▼2.0	11,696	8.2	▼2.0
AfD	Klaus Voigtmann	6,277	4.4		8,700	6.1	
Left	Heinrich Stürtz	5,345	3.7	▼3.5	6,357	4.4	▼3.3
FDP	Lucia Biedermann	3,966	2.8	▼8.7	8,133	5.7	▼13.5
Pirates	Harry Botzenhardt	3,396	2.4		3,556	2.5	▲0.3
FW	Sven Nitsche	1,804	1.3		1,364	1.0	
NPD	Jörg Scheibler	1,716	1.2	▼0.9	1,628	1.1	▼0.2
Tierschutzpartei					1,416	1.0	▲0.1
REP	Timo Weih	1,261	0.9		1,042	0.7	▼0.5
RENTNER					418	0.3	
ÖDP					278	0.2	▼0.1
Volksabstimmung					272	0.2	▼0.1
Party of Reason					173	0.1	
PRO					168	0.1	
PBC					164	0.1	▼0.2
BIG					89	0.1	
MLPD					42	0.0	0.0
BüSo					22	0.0	0.0
Informal votes		2,468			2,072		
Total valid votes		142,639			143,035		
Turnout		145,107	74.1	▲1.3			
CDU hold	Majority	38,692	27.1	▲3.8			

=== 2009 election ===
Federal election (2009): Bruchsal – Schwetzingen
Notes:	Blue background denotes the winner of the electorate vote. Pink background denotes a candidate elected from their party list. Yellow background denotes an electorate win by a list member, or other incumbent. A ✓ or ✗ denotes status of any incumbent, win or lose respectively.						
Party	Candidate	Votes	%	±%	Party votes	%	±%
CDU	✓ Olav Gutting	64,659	46.9	▼1.9	50,031	36.0	▼4.7
SPD	Werner Henn	32,525	23.6	▼11.3	27,934	20.1	▼10.8
FDP	Steffen Schöps	15,785	11.4	▲6.6	26,626	19.2	▲7.4
Greens	Christian Köpp	12,082	8.8	▲4.4	14,084	10.1	▲2.6
Left	Heinrich Stürtz	9,995	7.2	▲4.0	10,723	7.7	▲3.7
Pirates					2,976	2.1	
NPD	Karl Däschner	2,903	2.1	▲0.1	1,825	1.3	▼0.1
REP					1,642	1.2	0.0
Tierschutzpartei					1,301	0.9	
PBC					385	0.3	0.0
ÖDP					384	0.3	
Volksabstimmung					357	0.3	
DIE VIOLETTEN					254	0.2	
DVU					85	0.1	
BüSo					70	0.1	0.0
MLPD					65	0.0	0.0
ADM					48	0.0	
Informal votes		3,452			2,611		
Total valid votes		137,949			138,790		
Turnout		141,401	72.8	▼7.1			
CDU hold	Majority	32,134	23.3	▲9.4			

=== 2005 election ===
Federal election (2005):Bruchsal – Schwetzingen
Notes:	Blue background denotes the winner of the electorate vote. Pink background denotes a candidate elected from their party list. Yellow background denotes an electorate win by a list member, or other incumbent. A ✓ or ✗ denotes status of any incumbent, win or lose respectively.						
Party	Candidate	Votes	%	±%	Party votes	%	±%
CDU	✓ Olav Gutting	72,516	48.7	▲0.6	60,845	40.8	▼3.9
SPD	Stefan Rebmann	51,873	34.9	▼4.8	46,173	31.0	▼4.1
FDP	Gunter Zimmermann	7,210	4.8	▼1.1	17,619	11.8	▲4.8
Greens	Benjamin Bräuer	6,503	4.4	▼0.8	11,271	7.6	▼0.5
Left	Heinz-Peter Schwertges	4,776	3.2	▲2.0	6,075	4.1	▲3.3
NPD	Karl Daschner	3,012	2.0		2,177	1.5	▲1.1
Familie	Bernhard Gretter	2,923	2.0		1,897	1.3	0.0
REP					1,764	1.2	▲0.2
GRAUEN					689	0.5	▲0.3
PBC					443	0.3	▲0.1
MLPD					125	0.1	
BüSo					97	0.1	
Informal votes		3,562			3,200		
Total valid votes		148,813			149,175		
Turnout		152,375	79.9	▼1.9			
CDU hold	Majority	20,643	13.8				
