= Heidelberg (electoral district) =

Electoral constituency represented in the Bundestag

274 Heidelberg
- Electoral district for the Bundestag
- Heidelberg in 2025
- State: Baden-Württemberg
- Population: 324,700 (2019)
- Electorate: 218,431 (2021)
- Major settlements: Heidelberg; Weinheim; Eppelheim
- Area: 305.6 km^{2}

Current electoral district
- Created: 1949
- Member: Vacant
- Elected: 2025

Heidelberg is an electoral constituency (German: Wahlkreis) represented in the Bundestag. It elects one member via first-past-the-post voting. Under the current constituency numbering system, it is designated as constituency 274. It is located in northwestern Baden-Württemberg, comprising the city of Heidelberg and the northern part of the Rhein-Neckar-Kreis district.

Heidelberg was created for the inaugural 1949 federal election. Whilst the Christian Democratic Union won a plurality in the 2025 election, under the new voting system, their candidate did not actually win a seat in the Bundestag. This was due to the distribution of seats won by the CDU being decided by the first (direct) vote percentage of each winning CDU candidate, determining who took the seats. As the CDU candidate got a low vote of 29.2%, the seat will remain vacant throughout the 21st Bundestag.

== Geography ==
Heidelberg is located in northwestern Baden-Württemberg. As of the 2021 federal election, it comprises the independent city of Heidelberg and the municipalities of Dossenheim, Edingen-Neckarhausen, Eppelheim, Heddesheim, Hemsbach, Hirschberg an der Bergstraße, Ilvesheim, Ladenburg, Laudenbach, Schriesheim, and Weinheim from the Rhein-Neckar-Kreis district.

== History ==
Heidelberg was created in 1949. In the 1965 through 1976 elections, it was named Heidelberg-Stadt. In the 1949 election, it was Württemberg-Baden Landesbezirk Baden constituency 3 in the number system. In the 1953 through 1961 elections, it was number 177. In the 1965 through 1976 elections, it was number 181. In the 1980 through 1998 elections, it was number 178. In the 2002 and 2005 elections, it was number 275. Since the 2009 election, it has been number 274.

Originally, the constituency comprised the independent city of Heidelberg and the Landkreis Heidelberg district. In the 1965 through 1972 elections, it comprised the city of Heidelberg, the Eppelheim municipality from the Landkreis Heidelberg district, and the municipalities of Altlußheim, Brühl, Hockenheim, Ketsch, Neulußheim, Oftersheim, Plankstadt, Reilingen, and Schwetzingen from the Landkreis Mannheim district. In the 1976 through 1998 elections, its borders did not change, but its area from the Landkreis Mannheim and Landkreis Heidelberg districts became part of the Rhein-Neckar-Kreis district. It acquired its current borders in the 2002 election.

Election	No.	Name	Borders
1949	3	Heidelberg	Heidelberg city; Landkreis Heidelberg district
1953	177	Heidelberg	Heidelberg city; Landkreis Heidelberg district
1957	177	Heidelberg	Heidelberg city; Landkreis Heidelberg district
1961	177	Heidelberg	Heidelberg city; Landkreis Heidelberg district
1965	181	Heidelberg-Stadt	Heidelberg city; Landkreis Heidelberg district (only Eppelheim municipality); Landkreis Mannheim district (only Altlußheim, Brühl, Hockenheim, Ketsch, Neulußheim, Oftersheim, Plankstadt, Reilingen, and Schwetzingen municipalities)
1969	181	Heidelberg-Stadt	Heidelberg city; Landkreis Heidelberg district (only Eppelheim municipality); Landkreis Mannheim district (only Altlußheim, Brühl, Hockenheim, Ketsch, Neulußheim, Oftersheim, Plankstadt, Reilingen, and Schwetzingen municipalities)
1972	181	Heidelberg-Stadt	Heidelberg city; Landkreis Heidelberg district (only Eppelheim municipality); Landkreis Mannheim district (only Altlußheim, Brühl, Hockenheim, Ketsch, Neulußheim, Oftersheim, Plankstadt, Reilingen, and Schwetzingen municipalities)
1976	181	Heidelberg-Stadt	Heidelberg city; Rhein-Neckar-Kreis district (only Altlußheim, Brühl, Eppelheim, Hockenheim, Ketsch, Neulußheim, Oftersheim, Plankstadt, Reilingen, and Schwetzingen municipalities)
1980	178	Heidelberg	Heidelberg city; Rhein-Neckar-Kreis district (only Altlußheim, Brühl, Eppelheim, Hockenheim, Ketsch, Neulußheim, Oftersheim, Plankstadt, Reilingen, and Schwetzingen municipalities)
1983	178	Heidelberg	Heidelberg city; Rhein-Neckar-Kreis district (only Altlußheim, Brühl, Eppelheim, Hockenheim, Ketsch, Neulußheim, Oftersheim, Plankstadt, Reilingen, and Schwetzingen municipalities)
1987	178	Heidelberg	Heidelberg city; Rhein-Neckar-Kreis district (only Altlußheim, Brühl, Eppelheim, Hockenheim, Ketsch, Neulußheim, Oftersheim, Plankstadt, Reilingen, and Schwetzingen municipalities)
1990	178	Heidelberg	Heidelberg city; Rhein-Neckar-Kreis district (only Altlußheim, Brühl, Eppelheim, Hockenheim, Ketsch, Neulußheim, Oftersheim, Plankstadt, Reilingen, and Schwetzingen municipalities)
1994	178	Heidelberg	Heidelberg city; Rhein-Neckar-Kreis district (only Altlußheim, Brühl, Eppelheim, Hockenheim, Ketsch, Neulußheim, Oftersheim, Plankstadt, Reilingen, and Schwetzingen municipalities)
1998	178	Heidelberg	Heidelberg city; Rhein-Neckar-Kreis district (only Altlußheim, Brühl, Eppelheim, Hockenheim, Ketsch, Neulußheim, Oftersheim, Plankstadt, Reilingen, and Schwetzingen municipalities)
2002	275	Heidelberg	Heidelberg city; Rhein-Neckar-Kreis district (only Dossenheim, Edingen-Neckarhausen, Eppelheim, Heddesheim, Hemsbach, Hirschberg an der Bergstraße, Ilvesheim, Ladenburg, Laudenbach, Schriesheim, and Weinheim municipalities)
2005	275	Heidelberg	Heidelberg city; Rhein-Neckar-Kreis district (only Dossenheim, Edingen-Neckarhausen, Eppelheim, Heddesheim, Hemsbach, Hirschberg an der Bergstraße, Ilvesheim, Ladenburg, Laudenbach, Schriesheim, and Weinheim municipalities)
2009	274	Heidelberg	Heidelberg city; Rhein-Neckar-Kreis district (only Dossenheim, Edingen-Neckarhausen, Eppelheim, Heddesheim, Hemsbach, Hirschberg an der Bergstraße, Ilvesheim, Ladenburg, Laudenbach, Schriesheim, and Weinheim municipalities)
2013	274	Heidelberg	Heidelberg city; Rhein-Neckar-Kreis district (only Dossenheim, Edingen-Neckarhausen, Eppelheim, Heddesheim, Hemsbach, Hirschberg an der Bergstraße, Ilvesheim, Ladenburg, Laudenbach, Schriesheim, and Weinheim municipalities)
2017	274	Heidelberg	Heidelberg city; Rhein-Neckar-Kreis district (only Dossenheim, Edingen-Neckarhausen, Eppelheim, Heddesheim, Hemsbach, Hirschberg an der Bergstraße, Ilvesheim, Ladenburg, Laudenbach, Schriesheim, and Weinheim municipalities)
2021	274	Heidelberg	Heidelberg city; Rhein-Neckar-Kreis district (only Dossenheim, Edingen-Neckarhausen, Eppelheim, Heddesheim, Hemsbach, Hirschberg an der Bergstraße, Ilvesheim, Ladenburg, Laudenbach, Schriesheim, and Weinheim municipalities)
2025	274	Heidelberg	Heidelberg city; Rhein-Neckar-Kreis district (only Dossenheim, Edingen-Neckarhausen, Eppelheim, Heddesheim, Hemsbach, Hirschberg an der Bergstraße, Ilvesheim, Ladenburg, Laudenbach, Schriesheim, and Weinheim municipalities)

== Members ==
The constituency was first represented by Eduard Wahl of the Christian Democratic Union (CDU) from 1949 to 1969. It was won by Alex Möller of the Social Democratic Party (SPD) in 1969, who served until 1976. Karl Weber of the CDU was elected in 1976, and served one term. Hartmut Soell regained it for the SPD in 1980. Udo Ehrbar of the CDU was representative from 1983 to 1994. Karl A. Lamers of the CDU was elected in 1994 and served one term. Lothar Binding of the SPD was elected in 1998 and re-elected in 2002. Former member Lamers regained the constituency in 2005 and served as representative until 2021. Franziska Brantner won it for the Greens in 2021. The seat has been vacant since the 2025 election.

Election	Member	Party	%
1949	Eduard Wahl	CDU	36.7
1953	Eduard Wahl	CDU	48.3
1957	Eduard Wahl	CDU	52.6
1961	Eduard Wahl	CDU	45.4
1965	Eduard Wahl	CDU	47.3
1969	Alex Möller	SPD	45.8
1972	Alex Möller	SPD	49.6
1976	Karl Weber	CDU	48.4
1980	Hartmut Soell	SPD	44.9
1983	Udo Ehrbar	CDU	48.9
1987	Udo Ehrbar	CDU	43.9
1990	Udo Ehrbar	CDU	42.8
1994	Karl A. Lamers	CDU	43.2
1998	Lothar Binding	SPD	44.5
2002	Lothar Binding	SPD	42.9
2005	Karl A. Lamers	CDU	38.7
2009	Karl A. Lamers	CDU	36.1
2013	Karl A. Lamers	CDU	40.9
2017	Karl A. Lamers	CDU	32.7
2021	Franziska Brantner	GRÜNE	30.2
2025	Vacant (Note: Alexander Paul Föhr (CDU) won with 29.2% but seat remained vacant due to insufficient second votes cover.)		

== Election results ==
=== 2025 election ===
Under the new voting system implemented for the 2025 election, although the CDU candidate won the most votes in this constituency, due to the low winning percentage, the constituency seat will remain vacant as not enough second (party) votes were won to be allocated this seat.

Federal election (2025): Heidelberg
Notes:	Blue background denotes the winner of the electorate vote. Pink background denotes a candidate elected from their party list. Yellow background denotes an electorate win by a list member, or other incumbent. A ✓ or ✗ denotes status of any incumbent, win or lose respectively.						
Party	Candidate	Votes	%	±%	Party votes	%	±%
CDU	Alexander Paul Föhr	54,060	29.2	▲5.1	48,787	26.3	▲5.5
Greens	✗ Franziska Brantner	51,423	27.7	▼2.4	40,599	21.9	▼3.8
SPD	Dr. Tim Manfred Tugendhat	29,464	15.9	▼4.3	31,556	17.0	▼5.8
AfD	Dr. Malte Kaufmann	22,182	12.0	▲5.8	22,414	12.1	▲5.9
Left	Sahra Mirow	13,225	7.1	▲3.2	18,830	10.1	▲5.3
FDP	Dennis Tim Nusser	6,767	3.7	▼5.4	10,535	5.7	▼7.5
BSW					6,388	3.4	
Volt	Maximilian Saßerath	3,251	1.8	▲0.8	2,100	1.1	▲0.4
FW	Julian Scharbert	2,566	1.4	▼0.2	1,377	0.7	▼0.4
APT					1,323	0.7	▼0.3
PARTEI	Julia Burmeister	2,271	1.2	Steady	913	0.5	▼0.3
dieBasis					318	0.2	▼1.2
ÖDP					221	0.1	▼0.1
Bündnis C					171	0.1	Steady
BD					157	0.1	
MLPD	Bernhard Alfons Schweigert	175	0.1	Steady	52	0.0	Steady
Informal votes		1,156			799		
Total valid votes		185,384			185,741		
Turnout		186,540	85.5	▲4.0			
Vacant gain from Greens	Majority						

=== 2021 election ===
Federal election (2021): Heidelberg
Notes:	Blue background denotes the winner of the electorate vote. Pink background denotes a candidate elected from their party list. Yellow background denotes an electorate win by a list member, or other incumbent. A ✓ or ✗ denotes status of any incumbent, win or lose respectively.						
Party	Candidate	Votes	%	±%	Party votes	%	±%
Greens	Franziska Brantner	53,288	30.2	▲13.5	45,314	25.6	▲8.5
CDU	Alexander Föhr	42,582	24.1	▼8.6	36,783	20.8	▼9.1
SPD	Elisabeth Krämer	35,602	20.2	▼5.9	40,275	22.8	▲4.3
FDP	Dennis Nusser	15,906	9.0	▲2.4	23,240	13.1	▲0.5
AfD	Malte Kaufmann	10,823	6.1	▼2.8	10,821	6.1	▼3.4
Left	Zara Kızıltaş	6,987	4.0	▼2.1	8,624	4.9	▼3.5
dieBasis	Ulrich Becker	2,976	1.7		2,466	1.4	
FW	Daniel Brenzel	2,839	1.6	▲0.6	2,011	1.1	▲0.6
Tierschutzpartei					1,761	1.0	▲0.3
PARTEI	Franziskus Schmitz	2,151	1.2	0.0	1,470	0.8	▼0.2
Volt	Verena Willaredt	1,680	1.0		1,256	0.7	
KlimalisteBW	Friederike Benjes	1,070	0.6				
Team Todenhöfer					624	0.4	
Pirates					486	0.3	▼0.1
Humanists	Wasilios Vlachopoulos	592	0.3		379	0.2	
ÖDP					367	0.2	0.0
Gesundheitsforschung					186	0.1	
Bündnis C					184	0.1	
DiB					161	0.1	▼0.1
NPD					114	0.1	▼0.1
Bürgerbewegung					97	0.1	
MLPD	Bernhard Schweigert	141	0.1	0.0	65	0.0	0.0
Bündnis 21					44	0.0	
DKP					43	0.0	0.0
LKR					33	0.0	
Informal votes		1,231			1,064		
Total valid votes		176,637			176,804		
Turnout		177,868	81.4	▼0.8			
Greens gain from CDU	Majority	10,706	6.1				

=== 2017 election ===
Federal election (2017): Heidelberg
Notes:	Blue background denotes the winner of the electorate vote. Pink background denotes a candidate elected from their party list. Yellow background denotes an electorate win by a list member, or other incumbent. A ✓ or ✗ denotes status of any incumbent, win or lose respectively.						
Party	Candidate	Votes	%	±%	Party votes	%	±%
CDU	✓ Karl A. Lamers	58,019	32.7	▼8.2	53,138	29.9	▼7.6
SPD	Lothar Binding	46,219	26.0	▼4.5	32,806	18.4	▼4.9
Greens	Franziska Brantner	29,664	16.7	▲4.4	30,491	17.1	▲2.4
AfD	Malte Kaufmann	15,803	8.9	▲4.0	16,850	9.5	▲3.3
FDP	Dennis Nusser	11,769	6.6	▲3.5	22,556	12.7	▲5.7
Left	Sahra Mirow	10,751	6.1	▲1.9	14,812	8.3	▲2.7
PARTEI	Björn Leuzinger	2,183	1.2	▲0.8	1,780	1.0	
Tierschutzpartei					1,151	0.6	▼0.1
FW	Bernhard Barutta	1,792	1.0	▲0.5	990	0.6	▲0.1
Pirates	Alexander Schestag	1,174	0.7	▼1.4	734	0.4	▼2.3
Tierschutzallianz					389	0.2	
DiB					388	0.2	
ÖDP					386	0.2	0.0
NPD					303	0.2	▼0.5
BGE					297	0.2	
V-Partei³					248	0.1	
DM					199	0.1	
Menschliche Welt					167	0.1	
MLPD	Bernhard Schweigert	196	0.1		83	0.0	0.0
DKP					40	0.0	
DIE RECHTE					24	0.0	
Informal votes		1,568			1,306		
Total valid votes		177,570			177,832		
Turnout		179,138	82.2	▲4.3			
CDU hold	Majority	11,800	6.7	▼3.6			

=== 2013 election ===
Federal election (2013): Heidelberg
Notes:	Blue background denotes the winner of the electorate vote. Pink background denotes a candidate elected from their party list. Yellow background denotes an electorate win by a list member, or other incumbent. A ✓ or ✗ denotes status of any incumbent, win or lose respectively.						
Party	Candidate	Votes	%	±%	Party votes	%	±%
CDU	✓ Karl A. Lamers	68,061	40.9	▲4.8	62,331	37.5	▲6.8
SPD	Lothar Binding	50,850	30.6	▲0.9	38,915	23.4	▲1.4
Greens	Franziska Brantner	20,392	12.3	▼3.3	24,601	14.8	▼2.8
AfD	Jens Zeller	8,143	4.9		10,219	6.1	
Left	Sahra Mirow	6,892	4.1	▼1.5	9,413	5.7	▼1.7
FDP	Dirk Niebel	5,180	3.1	▼8.9	11,626	7.0	▼10.7
Pirates	Stevan Cirkovic	3,430	2.1		4,581	2.8	▲0.6
Tierschutzpartei					1,187	0.7	▲0.1
NPD	Jan Jaeschke	1,210	0.7	▼0.3	1,136	0.7	▼0.1
FW	Kay-Olaf Ballerstädt	776	0.5		766	0.5	
PARTEI	Andrej Kilian	722	0.4				
ÖDP	Martin Weinmann	663	0.4		405	0.2	0.0
RENTNER					289	0.2	
REP					268	0.2	▼0.3
Volksabstimmung					188	0.1	0.0
PBC					145	0.1	▼0.1
Party of Reason					121	0.1	
BIG					85	0.1	
PRO					76	0.0	
MLPD					44	0.0	0.0
BüSo					10	0.0	0.0
Informal votes		1,858			1,771		
Total valid votes		166,319			166,406		
Turnout		168,177	77.9	▲1.0			
CDU hold	Majority	17,211	10.3	▲3.9			

=== 2009 election ===
Federal election (2009): Heidelberg
Notes:	Blue background denotes the winner of the electorate vote. Pink background denotes a candidate elected from their party list. Yellow background denotes an electorate win by a list member, or other incumbent. A ✓ or ✗ denotes status of any incumbent, win or lose respectively.						
Party	Candidate	Votes	%	±%	Party votes	%	±%
CDU	✓ Karl A. Lamers	57,963	36.1	▼2.6	49,296	30.6	▼2.9
SPD	Lothar Binding	47,683	29.7	▼8.7	35,337	22.0	▼9.7
Greens	Fritz Kuhn	24,985	15.6	▲4.5	28,349	17.6	▲2.4
FDP	Dirk Niebel	19,314	12.0	▲4.7	28,419	17.7	▲5.1
Left	Carsten Labudda	8,985	5.6	▲2.6	11,823	7.3	▲3.0
Pirates					3,396	2.1	
NPD	Jan Jaeschke	1,652	1.0	▼0.4	1,318	0.8	▼0.2
Tierschutzpartei					958	0.6	
REP					686	0.4	▼0.1
ÖDP					364	0.2	
PBC					288	0.2	0.0
DIE VIOLETTEN					285	0.2	
Volksabstimmung					239	0.1	
DVU					71	0.0	
BüSo					62	0.0	0.0
MLPD					57	0.0	0.0
ADM					40	0.0	
Informal votes		2,338			1,932		
Total valid votes		160,582			160,988		
Turnout		162,920	76.9	▼4.9			
CDU hold	Majority	10,280	6.4	▲6.1			

=== 2005 election ===
Federal election (2005):Heidelberg
Notes:	Blue background denotes the winner of the electorate vote. Pink background denotes a candidate elected from their party list. Yellow background denotes an electorate win by a list member, or other incumbent. A ✓ or ✗ denotes status of any incumbent, win or lose respectively.						
Party	Candidate	Votes	%	±%	Party votes	%	±%
CDU	Karl A. Lamers	65,242	38.7	▲0.6	56,533	33.5	▼2.1
SPD	✗ Lothar Binding	64,692	38.4	▼4.5	53,397	31.7	▼3.1
Greens	Fritz Kuhn	18,704	11.1	▲0.5	25,686	15.2	▼2.4
FDP	Dirk Niebel	12,366	7.3	▲1.0	21,107	12.5	▲4.2
Left	Carsten Labudda	5,064	3.0	▲2.1	7,307	4.3	▲3.0
NPD	Günter Deckert	2,369	1.4		1,665	1.0	▲0.7
Familie					870	0.5	
REP					810	0.5	0.0
GRAUEN					745	0.4	▲0.2
PBC					349	0.2	
MLPD					92	0.1	
BüSo					89	0.1	
Informal votes		2,478			2,275		
Total valid votes		168,437			168,640		
Turnout		170,915	81.8	▼1.9			
CDU gain from SPD	Majority	550	0.3				
