= Schwetzingen (electoral district) =

State electoral district of Germany

40: Schwetzingen
- Electoral district for the Landtag of Baden-Württemberg
- Schwetzingen in 2026
- District: Rhein-Neckar-Kreis
- Electorate: 94,388 (2026)
- Major settlements: Altlußheim, Brühl, Eppelheim, Hockenheim, Ketsch, Neulußheim, Oftersheim, Plankstadt, Reilingen, and Schwetzingen

Current electoral district
- Party: CDU
- Member: Andreas Sturm

Schwetzingen is an electoral constituency (German: Wahlkreis) represented in the Landtag of Baden-Württemberg.

Since 2026, it has elected one member via first-past-the-post voting. Voters cast a second vote under which additional seats are allocated proportionally state-wide. Under the constituency numbering system, it is designated as constituency 40.

It is wholly within the district of Rhein-Neckar-Kreis.

== Geography ==
The constituency includes the municipalities of Altlußheim, Brühl, Eppelheim, Hockenheim, Ketsch, Neulußheim, Oftersheim, Plankstadt, Reilingen, and Schwetzingen, within the district of Rhein-Neckar-Kreis.

There were 94,388 eligible voters in 2026.

== Members ==
=== First mandate ===
Both prior to and since the electoral reforms for the 2026 election, the winner of the plurality of the vote (first-past-the-post) in every constituency won the first mandate.

| Election | Member | Party | % |
|---|---|---|---|
| 1976 | Lothar Gaa | CDU | |
| 1980 | Lothar Gaa | CDU | |
| 1984 | Michael Sieber | CDU | |
| 1988 | Michael Sieber | CDU | |
| 1992 | Gerhard Stratthaus | CDU | |
| 1996 | Gerhard Stratthaus | CDU | |
| 2001 | Gerhard Stratthaus | CDU | 43.6 |
| 2006 | Gerhard Stratthaus | CDU | 43.9 |
| 2011 | Gerhard Stratthaus | CDU | 34.4 |
| 2016 | Manfred Kern | Grüne | 26.6 |
| 2021 | Andre Baumann | Grüne | 31.3 |
| 2026 | Andreas Sturm | CDU | 34.1 |

=== Second mandate ===
Prior to the electoral reforms for the 2026 election, the seats in the state parliament were allocated proportionately amongst parties which received more than 5% of valid votes across the state. The seats that were won proportionally for parties that did not win as many first mandates as seats they were entitled to, were allocated to their candidates which received the highest proportion of the vote in their respective constituencies. This meant that following some elections, a constituency would have one or more members elected under a second mandate.

Prior to 2011, these second mandates were allocated to the party candidates who got the greatest number of votes, whilst from 2011-2021, these were allocated according to percentage share of the vote.

| Election | Member | Party | Member | Party |
|---|---|---|---|---|
| 1976 | Karl-Peter Wettstein | SPD | | |
| 1980 | Karl-Peter Wettstein | SPD | | |
| 1984 | Karl-Peter Wettstein | SPD | | |
| 1988 | Karl-Peter Wettstein | SPD | | |
| 1992 | Karl-Peter Wettstein | SPD | | |
| 1996 | Karl-Peter Wettstein | SPD | | |
| Jan 2000 | Rosa Grünstein | SPD | | |
| 2001 | Rosa Grünstein | SPD | | |
| 2006 | Rosa Grünstein | SPD | | |
| 2011 | Rosa Grünstein | SPD | Manfred Kern | Grüne |
| 2016 | Daniel Born | SPD | Klaus-Günther Voigtmann | AfD |
| 2021 | Daniel Born | SPD | Andreas Sturm | CDU |
| Jul 2025 | Daniel Born | IND | | |

== Election results ==
=== 2026 election ===
State election (2026): Schwetzingen
| Notes: | Blue background denotes the winner of the electorate vote. Pink background denotes a candidate elected from their party list. Yellow background denotes an electorate win by a list member, or other incumbent. A ✓ or ✗ denotes status of any incumbent, win or lose respectively. | | | | | | |
| Party | Candidate | Votes | % | ±% | Party votes | % | ±% |
|---|---|---|---|---|---|---|---|
| CDU | Andreas Sturm | 21,027 | 34.1 | ▲10.5 | 17,152 | 27.7 | ▲4.1 |
| Greens | ✗ Andre Baumann | 15,672 | 25.4 | ▼5.9 | 17,762 | 28.7 | ▼2.6 |
| AfD | Karlheinz Kolb | 11,926 | 19.3 | ▲8.9 | 11,991 | 19.4 | ▲8.9 |
| SPD | Vincent Kilian | 5,722 | 9.3 | ▼5.5 | 4,718 | 7.6 | ▼7.2 |
| Left | Mara Zeltmann | 3,024 | 4.9 | ▲1.8 | 2,573 | 4.2 | ▲1.0 |
| FDP | Holger Höfs | 2,455 | 4.0 | ▼4.2 | 2,481 | 4.0 | ▼4.1 |
| FW | | | | | 1,451 | 2.3 | ▼1.3 |
| BSW | | | | | 880 | 1.4 | |
| APT | | | | | 872 | 1.4 | |
| Volt | Yannick Hild | 1,296 | 2.1 | | 739 | 1.2 | |
| PARTEI | | | | | 326 | 0.5 | ▼1.4 |
| Values | Alexander Mitsch | 528 | 0.9 | | 319 | 0.5 | |
| Pensioners | | | | | 129 | 0.2 | |
| dieBasis | | | | | 121 | 0.2 | ▼0.6 |
| Bündnis C | | | | | 83 | 0.1 | |
| Team Todenhöfer | | | | | 67 | 0.1 | |
| ÖDP | | | | | 50 | 0.1 | ▼0.5 |
| Humanists | | | | | 34 | 0.1 | |
| Verjüngungsforschung | | | | | 34 | 0.1 | |
| KlimalisteBW | | | | | 31 | 0.1 | ▼0.7 |
| PdF | | | | | 26 | 0.0 | |
| Informal votes | | 610 | | | 421 | | |
| Total valid votes | | 61,650 | | | 61,839 | | |
| Turnout | | 62,260 | 66.9 | ▲4.9 | | | |
| CDU gain from Greens | Majority | 5,355 | 8.7 | | | | |

== See also ==
- Politics of Baden-Württemberg
- Landtag of Baden-Württemberg
