= Lothar Binding =

German politician (born 1950)

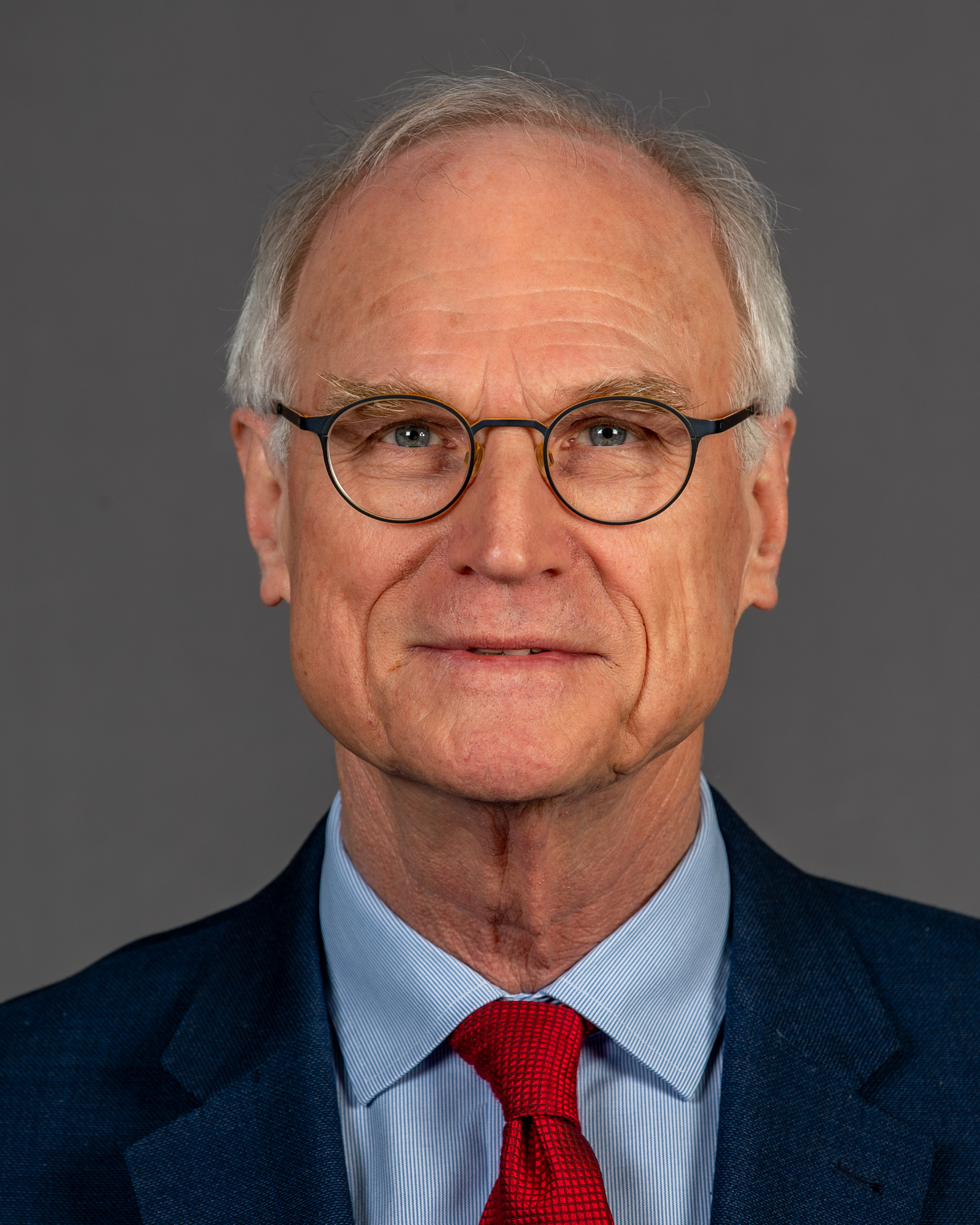
- Binding in 2020

Member of the Bundestag; from Baden-Württemberg
- In office 26 October 1998 – 26 October 2021
- Preceded by: Karl A. Lamers
- Succeeded by: Multi-member district
- Constituency: Heidelberg (1998–2005); State list (2005–2021)

Personal details
- Born: 1 April 1950 (age 76) Niestetal, West Germany
- Party: Social Democratic
- Children: 2
- Education: University of Tübingen; Heidelberg University
- Occupation: Electrician

Lothar Binding (born 1 April 1950) is a German politician of the Social Democratic Party of Germany (SPD) who served as a member of the Bundestag from the 1998 election until 2021.

== Early life ==
Binding was born in Sandershausen. After his apprenticeship as a heavy- current electrician (1965–1968) he graduated Hesse College (Abitur) in 1972. Following his national civil service as a nurse's helper he studied mathematics, physics and philosophy at the universities of Heidelberg and Tübingen. In 1981 he obtained a Diplom degree in mathematics and physics at Ruprecht Karl University Heidelberg.

Following his Diplom Binding worked as a technician and from 1987 until 1998 as an IT specialist at the Computer Center of Heidelberg University where he was responsible for planning, creating and operating local networks and high speed networks for data processing.

Binding is married and has two sons.

== Political career ==
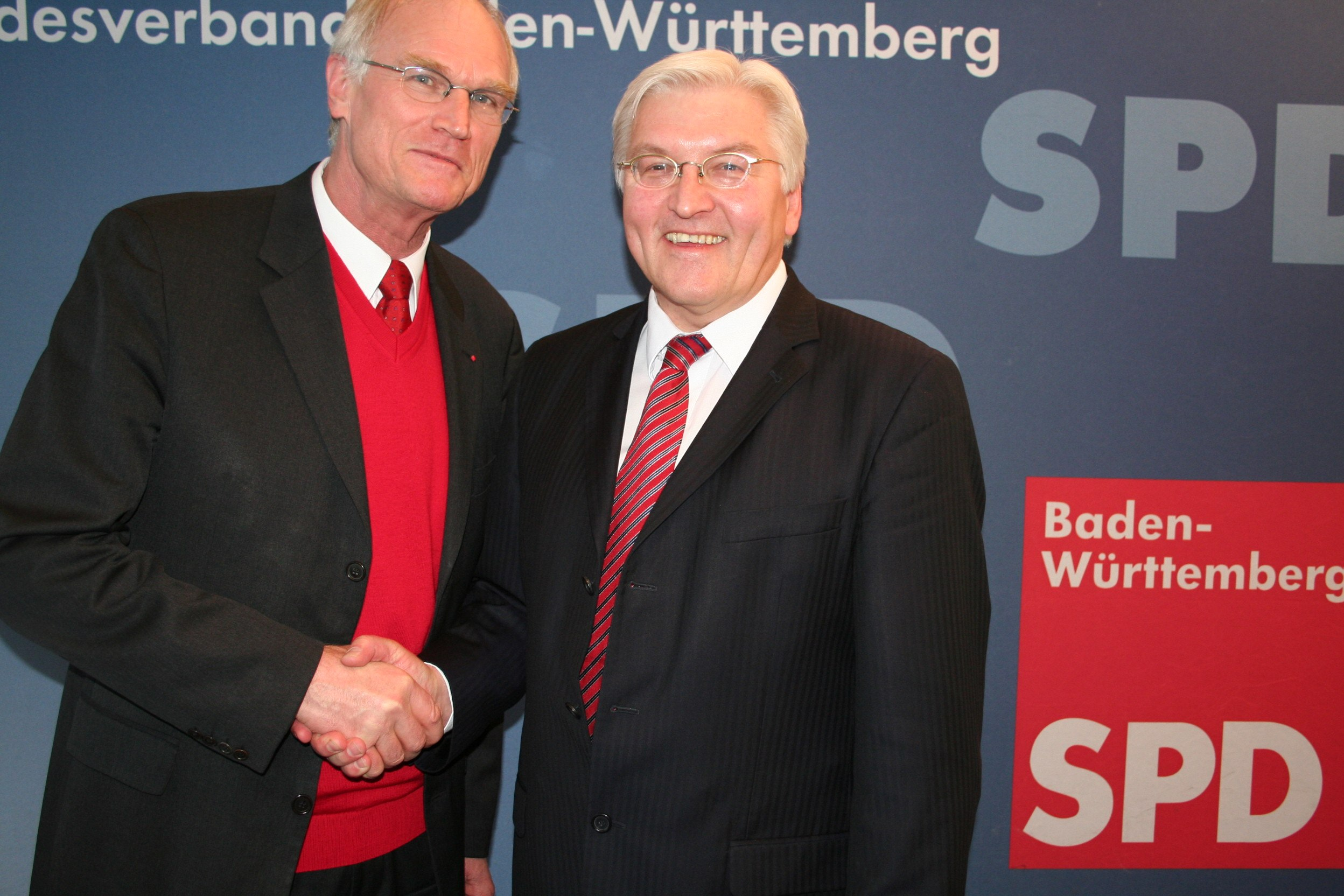
Lothar Binding and Frank-Walter Steinmeier

In 1965, Binding joined both the SPD and the IG Metall. From 1986 until 1994 he served as the chairman of the SPD district association in Heidelberg. In 1989, he was elected to the city council of Heidelberg and in 1994 he became chairman of the SPD group in the council until 2000.

From the 1998 national elections, Binding was a member of the German Bundestag (lower house of Parliament), representing Heidelberg. Throughout his time in parliament, he served on the Finance Committee. Within the SPD parliamentary group, he was the deputy spokesman of the financial policy working group from 2002 until 2005 and again from 2009 until 2012; he served as the working group's spokesman from 2012. He was also a member of the working group on municipal policy from 2005 until 2021.

On the Budget Committee, Binding served as his parliamentary group's rapporteur on the budgets of the Federal Constitutional Court (2005-2009), the Federal Ministry of Justice (2005-2019) and the Federal Ministry of Economic Cooperation and Development (2009-2013).

In the negotiations to form a Grand Coalition of Chancellor Angela Merkel's Christian Democrats (CDU together with the Bavarian CSU) and the SPD following the 2013 German elections, Binding was part of the SPD delegation in the working group on banking regulation and the Eurozone, led by Herbert Reul and Martin Schulz.

From 2014 to 2015, Binding was part of the SPD parliamentary group's leadership under chairman Thomas Oppermann.

In addition, Binding was the initiator of the bipartisan group resolution which laid the groundwork for the anti-smoking legislation in Germany including the federal legislation in 2007 and some German states' legislation in the following years.

In April 2020, Binding announced that he would not stand in the 2021 federal elections but instead resign from active politics by the end of the parliamentary term.

== Other activities ==
=== Government agencies ===
- Federal Financial Supervisory Authority (BaFin), Alternate Member of the Administrative Council
- GIZ, Member of the Supervisory Board (2010-2012)

=== Corporate boards ===
- Sparkasse Heidelberg, Member of the Supervisory Board (1989-2001)

=== Non-profit organizations ===
- Business Forum of the Social Democratic Party of Germany, Member of the Political Advisory Board (since 2018)
- German United Services Trade Union (ver.di), Member
- Association of German Foundations, Member of the Parliamentary Advisory Board
- Eurosolar, Member
