= Eduard Wahl =

German politician

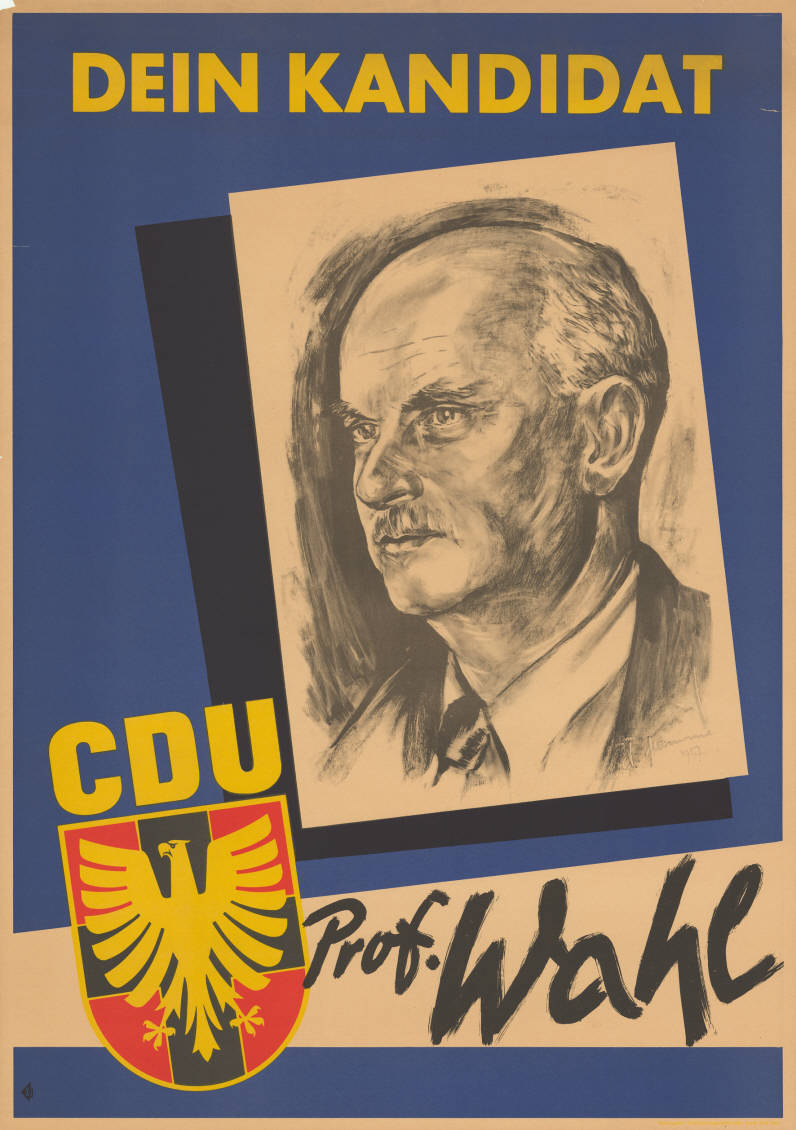
- Wahl on a election poster

Member of the Bundestag
- In office 7 September 1949 – 19 October 1969
- Preceded by: Constituency established
- Succeeded by: Alex Möller
- Constituency: Heidelberg (1949–1965); Heidelberg-Stadt (1965–1969)

Personal details
- Born: 29 March 1903 Frankfurt, Germany
- Died: 6 February 1985 (aged 81) Heidelberg, West Germany
- Party: Christian Democratic Union
- Education: Goethe University Frankfurt; Heidelberg University; Marburg University; University of Paris

Eduard Wahl (29 March 1903 – 6 February 1985) was a German politician of the Christian Democratic Union (CDU) and former member of the German Bundestag.

== Life ==
Wahl joined the CDU in 1945 and became chairman of the Heidelberg district association in 1950. In the election to the first German Bundestag in 1949, he was elected to parliament as a direct candidate in the Heidelberg constituency (later renamed Heidelberg City constituency). In the first legislative period he was a full member of the Committee for the Protection of the Rights of the People's Representation and for the Occupation Statute. He was also an alternate member of the Committee on Patent Law and Legal Protection. From March 1953, he was also a member of the Committee on Electoral Law and the Committee on Legal Affairs and Constitutional Law, of which he was also a member in the second legislative period. During the first four legislative periods, from 1949 to 1965, he was also an alternate member of the Electoral Examination Committee. In the second term he was chairman of the Committee on Consequences of Occupation; in the third and fourth terms he was a full member of the Committees on Verification of Credentials, Immunity and Rules of Procedure. In the 1965 Bundestag elections, Wahl was re-elected to the Bundestag and, as he had done since 1957, served on the Legal Affairs Committee. From 1968 until he left the Bundestag a year later, he was also chairman of the Committee on Economic Affairs and Development.

== Literature ==
Herbst, Ludolf; Jahn, Bruno (2002). Vierhaus, Rudolf (ed.). Biographisches Handbuch der Mitglieder des Deutschen Bundestages. 1949–2002 [Biographical Handbook of the Members of the German Bundestag. 1949–2002] (in German). München: De Gruyter - De Gruyter Saur. p. 1715. ISBN 978-3-11-184511-1.
