= Malte Kaufmann =

German politician

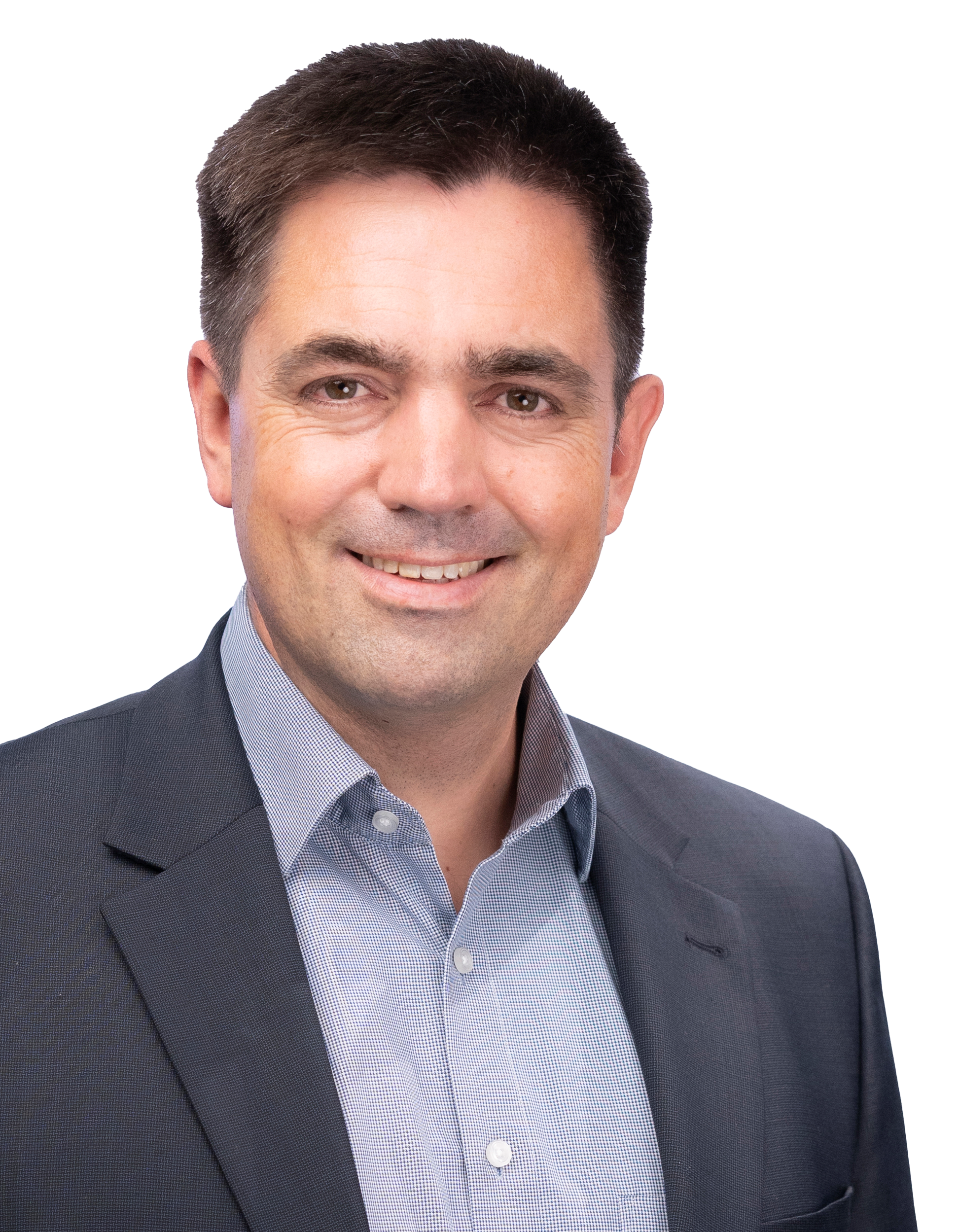

Member of the Bundestag
- Incumbent
- Assumed office 2021
- Constituency: Baden-Württemberg

Personal details
- Born: 14 December 1976 (age 49) Mannheim
- Party: Alternative for Germany (since 2016)

Malte Kaufmann (born 14 December 1976 in Mannheim) is a German economist, entrepreneur and politician from the AfD. He has been Member of the German Bundestag since 2021.

== Political career ==
In the 2021 German federal election, he contested Heidelberg, but came in fifth place. He was elected on the state list.

== See also ==
- List of members of the 20th Bundestag
