= Hockenheim =

- Town
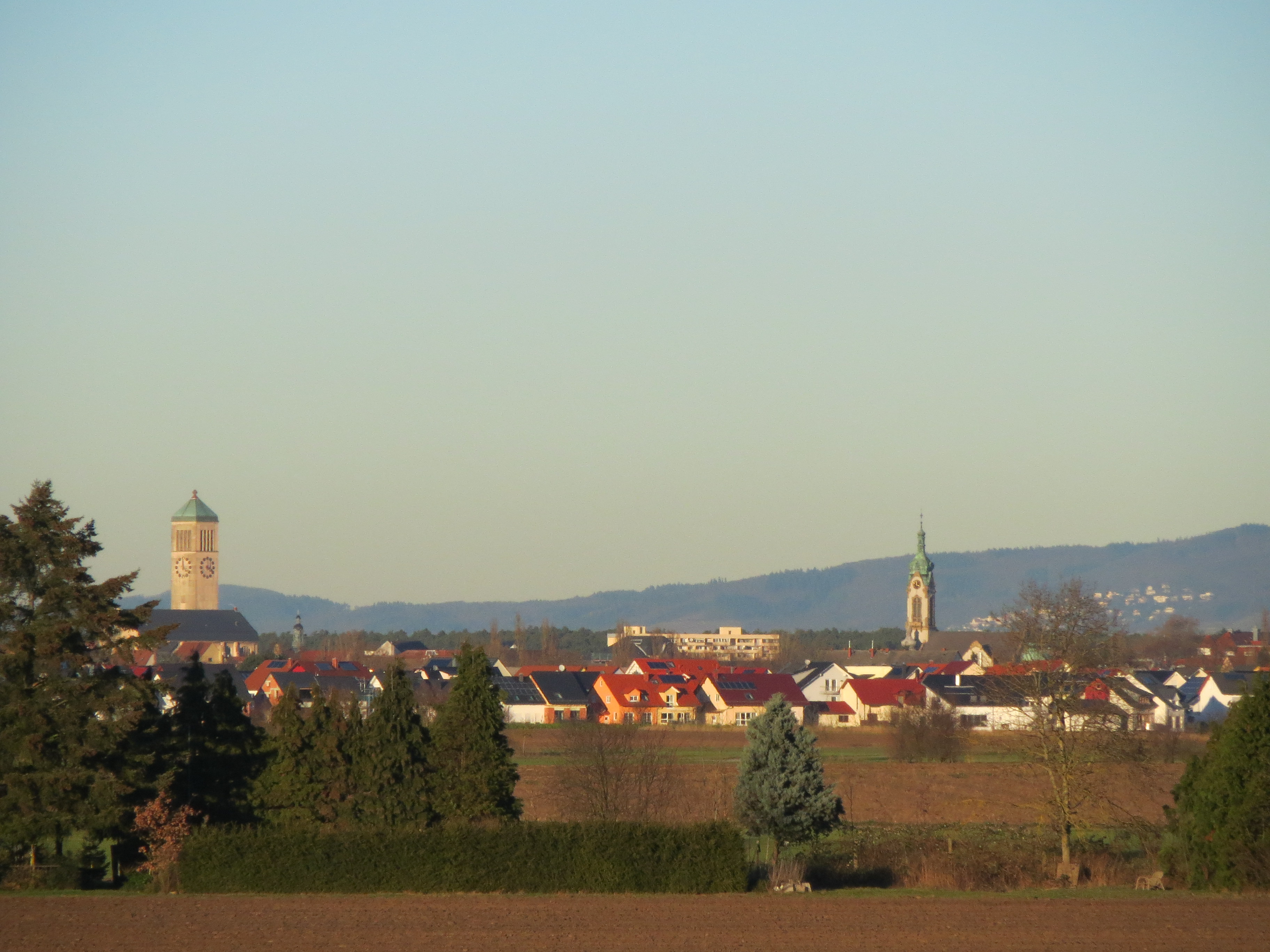

- Coat of arms

- Location of Hockenheim within Rhein-Neckar-Kreis district
- Interactive map of Hockenheim
- Location within Germany Location within Baden-Württemberg
- Coordinates: 49°19′05″N 08°32′50″E
- Country: Germany
- State: Baden-Württemberg
- Admin. region: Karlsruhe
- District: Rhein-Neckar-Kreis

Government
  - Mayor (2019–27): Marcus Zeitler (CDU)

Area
  - Total: 34.84 km^{2} (13.45 sq mi)
- Elevation: 102 m (335 ft)

Population (2025-12-31)
  - Total: 21,599
  - Density: 619.9/km^{2} (1,606/sq mi)
- Time zone: UTC+01:00 (CET)
  - Summer (DST): UTC+02:00 (CEST)
- Postal codes: 68754–68766
- Dialling codes: 06205
- Vehicle registration: HD
- Website: www.hockenheim.de

Hockenheim (German: [ˈhɔkn̩haɪm]) is a town in northwest Baden-Württemberg, Germany, about 20 km south of Mannheim and 10 km west of Walldorf. It is located in the Upper Rhine valley on the tourist theme routes "Baden Asparagus Route" (Badische Spargelstraße) and Bertha Benz Memorial Route. The town is widely known for its Hockenheimring, a motor racing course, which has hosted over 30 Formula One German Grand Prix races since 1970.

Hockenheim is one of the six largest towns in the Rhein-Neckar-Kreis district; since 1999 the number of inhabitants exceeded the 20,000 threshold, thus the town received the status of a regional central town (Große Kreisstadt) in 2001. It is twinned with the French town of Commercy, the German town of Hohenstein-Ernstthal in Saxony and the American town of Mooresville, North Carolina.

== Geography ==
=== Location and environment ===
Hockenheim is located in the Upper Rhine valley on an old trade route from Frankfurt to Basel. The brook Kraichbach divides the town in an eastern and a smaller western area, and flows into the Rhine to the north near Ketsch. Hockenheim's total municipal area covers 3,484 ha, with ca. 28.8 percent used for settlement and transportation and ca. 45.9 percent for agriculture. The remaining area consists of ca. 22 percent forests and ca. 2.4 percent rivers and seas.

The municipal area is divided into two large natural regions, the "Rheinaue" to the west and the slightly higher "Niederterrasse" to the east. The so-called "Hockenheimer Rheinbogen" is a meander area of the Rhine, which stretches over the municipalities of Ketsch, Hockenheim and Altlußheim. 30 parts of it with a total of 656 ha are under nature conservation. An additional area three times larger is designated as landscape conservation area, with less strict usage limitations. The "Rheinbogen" offers biologically diverse, secondary wetlands as habitat for endangered plants and animals, it is also an internationally important resting and feeding area for migrating birds in winter.

=== Town structure ===
The central urban area forms one unit and is only divided into five districts for statistical purposes. Together with the central town several small settlements belong to Hockenheim: the industrial areas "Bahnstation Talhaus" and "Wasserwerk", the farms and houses "Insultheimerhof", "Herrenteich, Ziegelei" and "Ketschau, Ziegelei" as well as the deserted settlement "Westeheim".

== History ==
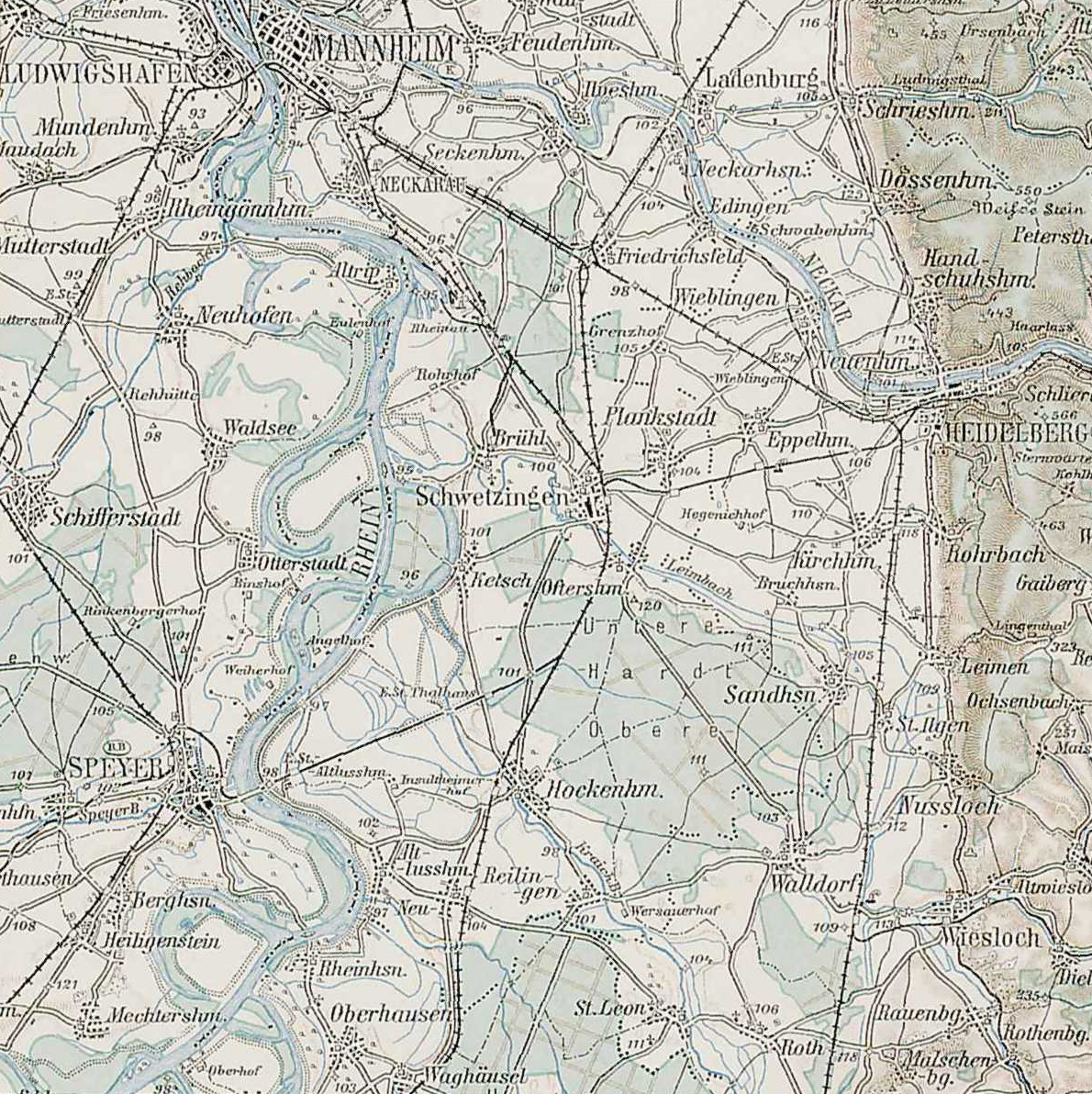
Hockenheim and surroundings 1907

Stamped bricks of the Roman Legio XIV Gemina Martia Victrix were found in 1984 in a brick kiln during an excavation in Hockenheim. The stationing of this legion near Mainz from 71AD until 92AD indicates an early settlement in this area. Hockenheim was first mentioned in 769 as "Ochinheim" in a donation document of the Lorsch Codex, an early monastery gift documentation. The name "Hockenheim" itself appeared first in 1238 in official documents. In the Middle Ages Hockenheim was owned by several alternating local authorities: the castle district Wersau, the Diocese of Speyer during the 12th and 13th century, various Palatinate ("Pfalz") rulers since 1286 and the Electoral Palatinate ("Kurpfalz") since 1462.

In the 17th century Hockenheim was severely devastated twice by French troops, 1644 in the Thirty Years' War and 1674 in the Franco-Dutch War. During this period the former cultivation of hops in the area was partly replaced with tobacco, brought into the country by the French. In 1803 the Electoral Palatinate was dissolved and the village was integrated in Baden. With the growing tobacco crop the village flourished and was awarded town rights on 22 July 1895 by Frederick I, Grand Duke of Baden.

The opening of the Rhine railway through Baden in 1870 led to the town's connection to railway network. With the beginning of the 20th century asparagus cultivation replaced most of the remaining hops industry. At 29 May 1932 the Hockenheimring was opened with a motorcycle race. After World War II the decline of the cigar industry had begun, but Hockenheim was already known for its Hockenheimring and could expand in other industrial branches. In January 1973 Hockenheim was assigned to the newly formed Rhein-Neckar-Kreis district.

In 1986, the Mannheim to Stuttgart high-speed railway was built through the town. In order to provide an interconnection between the high-speed line and the classic Rhine railway, the latter was moved west by 130 metres (430 ft) and the land freed up by the removal of the old alignment was converted into a public park. In 1991, Hockenheim was the host of the 11th Baden-Württemberg State Horticultural Show, utilising this new space.

== Politics ==
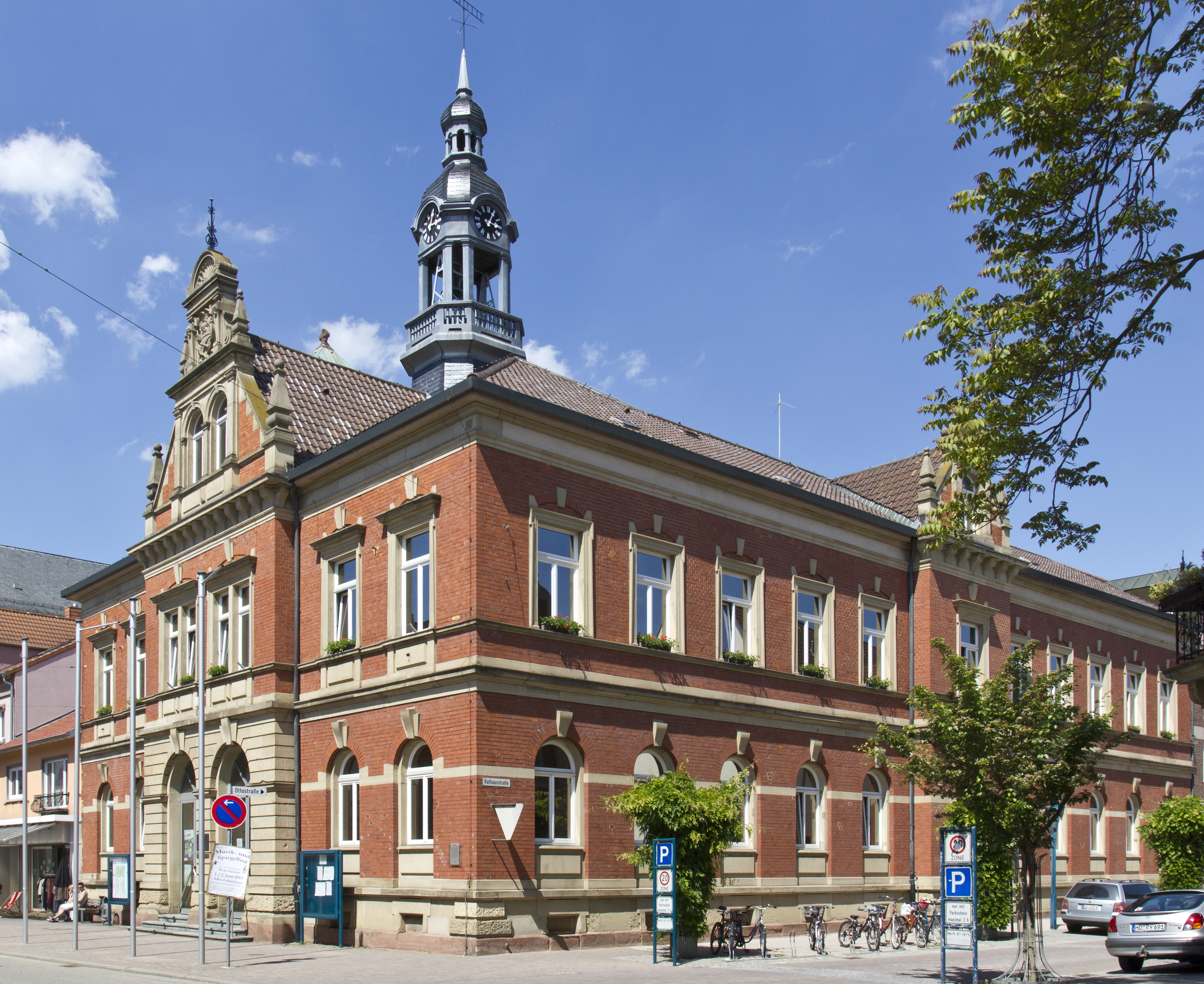
Town hall

The town is led by the Lord Mayor ("Oberbürgermeister"), who is elected directly by the population every 8 years; since 2004 this office is held by Dieter Gummer (SPD). Its Permanent Representative is the "Erste Beigeordnete", with the office designation of mayor ("Bürgermeister"). As of the local election on 25 May 2014, the local council of Hockenheim consists of 22 members, who hold the title "Stadtraetin/Stadtrat", and the Lord Mayor presiding the council.

In 1975 the Hockenheim government agreed upon a municipal association ("Verwaltungsgemeinschaft") with the neighboring villages Altlußheim, Neulußheim and Reilingen. Hockenheim is one of the six largest towns in the Rhein-Neckar-Kreis district; since 1999 the number of inhabitants exceeds the 20,000 threshold, thus the town received the status of a regional central town ("Große Kreisstadt") in 2001.

== Transport ==
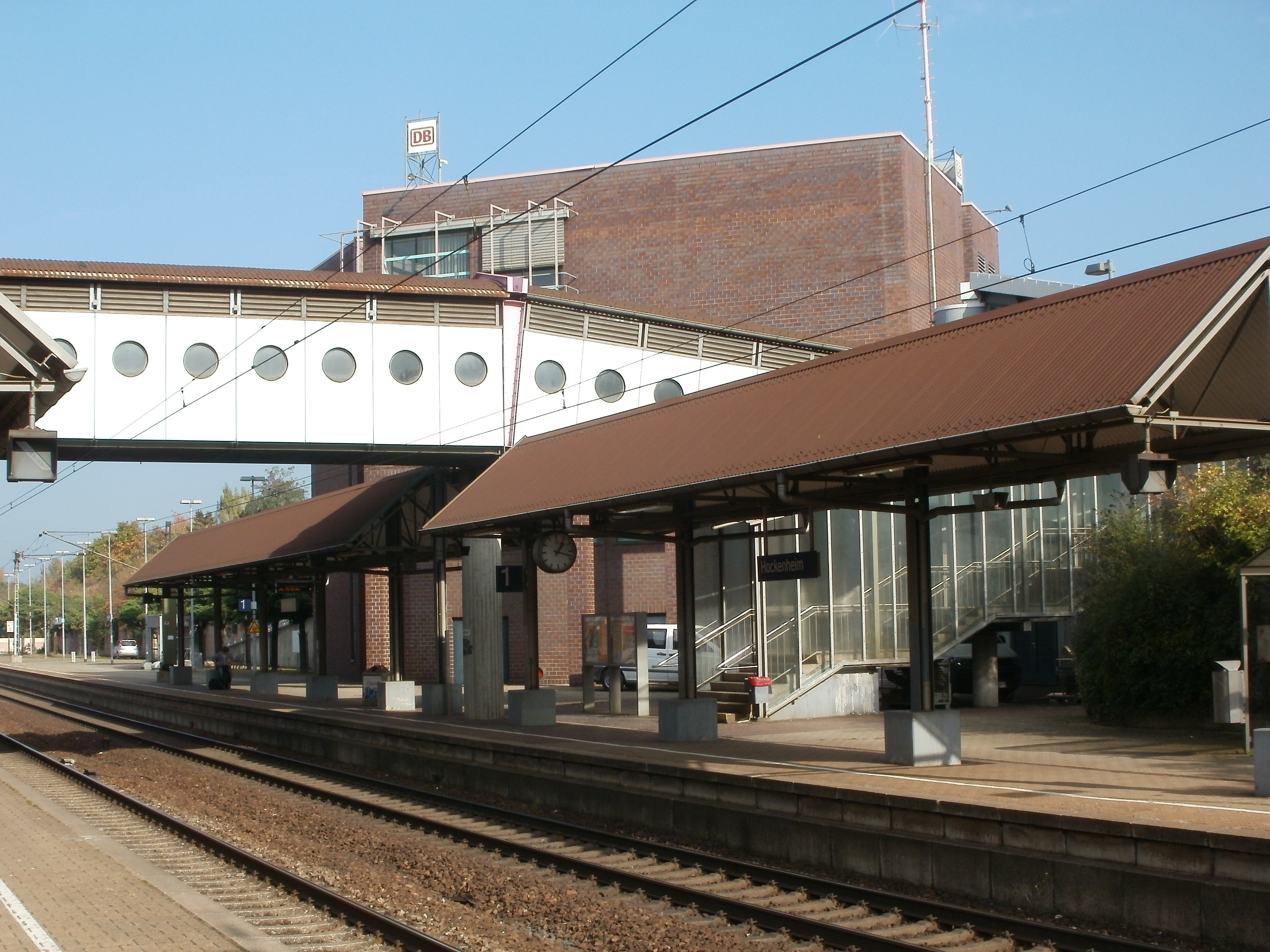
Hockenheim station

Hockenheim station is located on both the Rhine railway, opened in 1870, and the Mannheim–Stuttgart high-speed railway, opened in 1991. It is served by half-hourly trains, on line S9 of the Rhine-Neckar S-Bahn, between Karlsruhe and Mannheim. In peak periods it is also served by Regional-Express trains on the same route.

Hockenheim is located on the federal motorways A6, from Saarbrücken to Waidhaus, and A61, from a junction with the A6 at Hockenheim to the Netherlands near Venlo. The A5 passes to the east of Hockenheim on its way from a point near Kirchheim to Switzerland near Basel. Hockenheim is also on the federal highway B39, from Frankenstein to Mainhardt.

== Coat of arms ==
Adopted in 1609, the coat of arms of Hockenheim has diagonally crossed silver hooks in a sign, below a crowned golden lion. The lion is the animal of the Electoral Palatinate, to which Hockenheim belonged; the hooks are probably derived from the place name. The form of the symbols was changed several times, but has been specified in its current form by municipal law since 1895.

== Sport ==
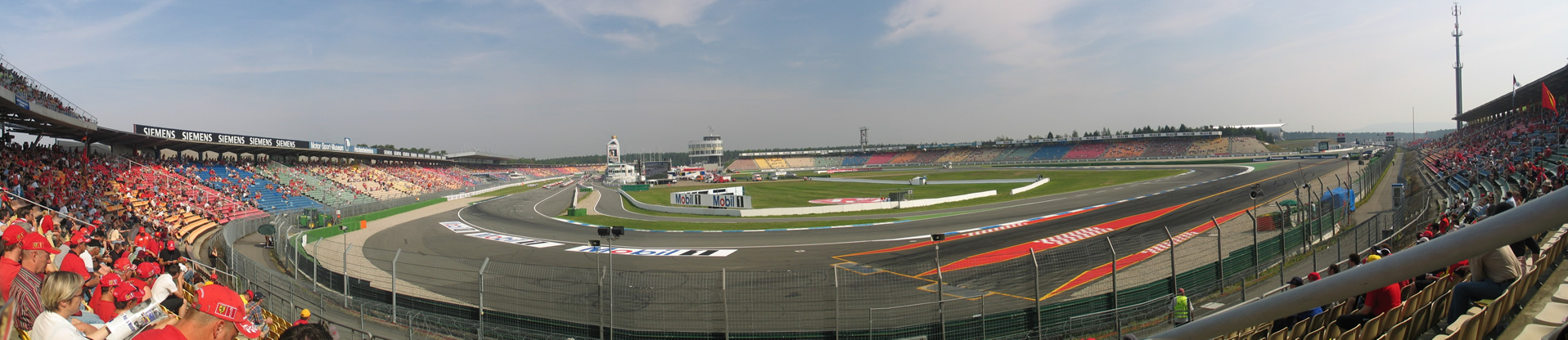
The Hockenheimring

The Hockenheimring, a motor racing course built in 1932, has become the home of the Formula One German Grand Prix. It has hosted this event over 30 times since 1970, including every year between 1986 and 2006. Since 2007 Formula One races in Germany are alternating annually between the Hockenheimring and the Nürburgring; Hockenheim hosts the event on even years. The course is also used for several other motor racing events and open-air concerts. After Nurburgring's withdrawal from 2015, Hockenheimring started hosting German Grand Prix annually since 2018. However, the track ownership and management and Formula One Management have not yet agreed a deal to extend the track's holding of the German Grand Prix beyond 2019. So far the track has not been utilised for the Grand Prix ever since (as of the 2026 formula one calendar).

== Places of interest ==
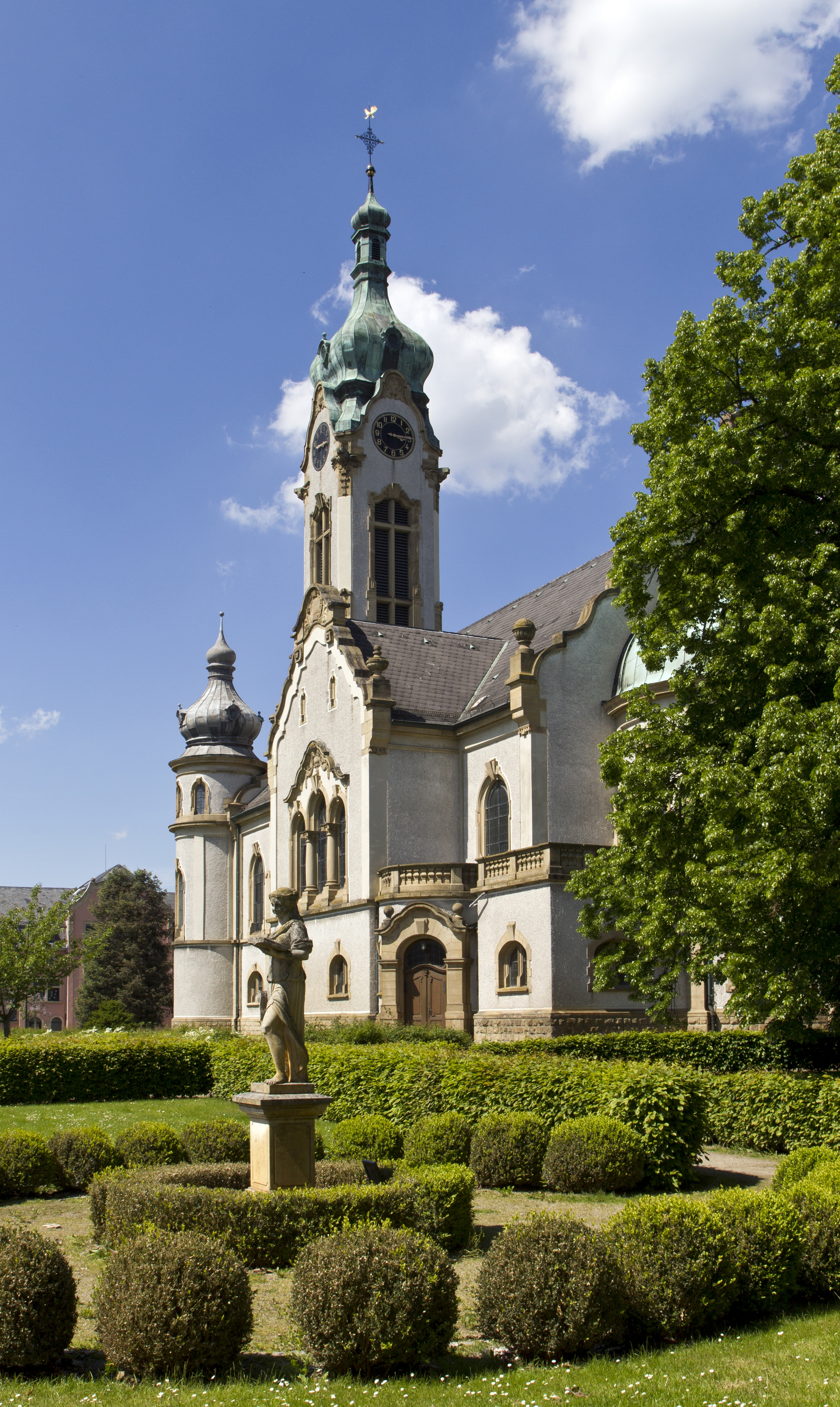
The Protestant town church

A museum for tobacco cultivation was founded 1984 as the first of its kind in Baden-Württemberg. The motorsport museum opened near the Hockenheimring in 1986 and shows over 200 exhibits of historical motorcycles and engines. The "Gartenschaupark" was created in 1991 to host the State Horticultural Show and is, with an area of 16 ha, Hockenheim's largest park.

Hockenheim's landmark is the water tower, constructed in 1910 in Art Nouveau. Other buildings of historical significance include the Protestant town church, a 1906 Neo-baroque building by architect Hermann Behaghel, and the Catholic Church (1910), done in Art Nouveau with a high tower, by Johannes Schroth. The old Catholic church, with a classical hall (1817) and a late Gothic choir tower (1490), serves as a community center today.

== International relations ==
Hockenheim is twinned with:

- Commercy, France, since 1970
- Hohenstein-Ernstthal, Saxony, Germany, since 1990 (town in former East Germany before reunification)
- Mooresville, North Carolina, United States, since 2002.

A town sponsorship (German: Städtepatenschaft) for Samba in Samba Department, Burkina Faso was established in May 1985.
