= Alex Möller =

German politician (1903–1985)

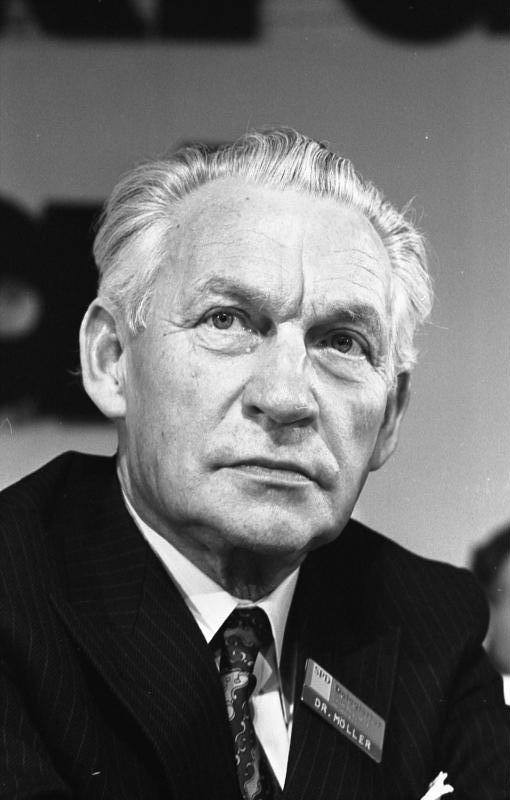
- Möller in 1973

Minister of Finance
- In office 22 October 1969 – 13 May 1971
- Chancellor: Willy Brandt
- Preceded by: Franz Josef Strauss
- Succeeded by: Karl Schiller

Member of the Bundestag; from Baden-Württemberg
- In office 17 October 1961 – 14 December 1976
- Preceded by: Multi-member district
- Succeeded by: Karl Weber
- Constituency: State list (1961–1969); Heidelberg-Stadt (1969–1976)
Landtag offices
Member of the; Landtag of Baden-Württemberg; for Karlsruhe-Stadt I
In office 25 March 1952 – 5 October 1961
Preceded by	Constituency established
Succeeded by	Walther Wäldele
Member of the; Landtag of Württemberg-Baden; for Karlsruhe-Land
In office 15 July 1946 – 30 May 1952
Preceded by	Constituency established
Succeeded by	Constituency abolished
Member of the Landtag of Prussia; for Halle-Merseburg
In office 1928–1933

Personal details
- Born: Alexander Johann Heinrich Friedrich Möller; 26 April 1903 Dortmund, Germany
- Died: 2 October 1985 (aged 82) Karlsruhe, West Germany
- Party: Social Democratic

Alexander Johann Heinrich Friedrich Möller (26 April 1903 – 2 October 1985) was a German politician of the Social Democratic Party (SPD).

== Biography ==
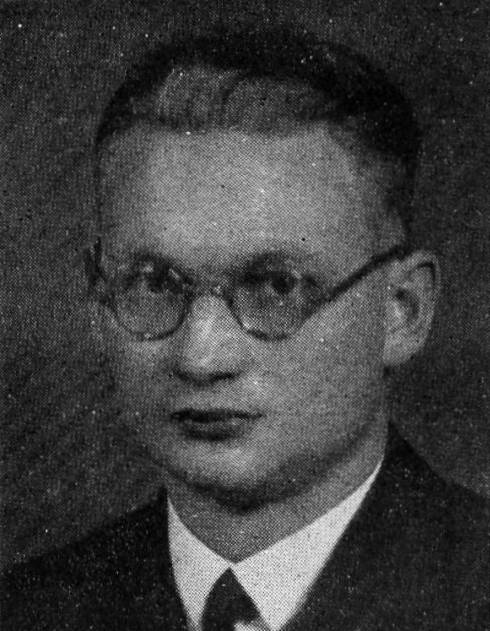
Möller's official Landtag portrait, 1932

Möller was born in Dortmund. He was a member of the Landtag of Prussia from 1928 to 1933. After the war, he served in the Landtag of Baden-Württemberg from 1946 to 5 October 1961, when he was elected to the Bundestag. His successor was Walther Wäldele. Möller stayed in the Bundestag up to 1976.

From 1969 to 1971, Möller served as Federal Minister of Finance in the Cabinet of Willy Brandt, resigning from the post after 2 years. According to one study, Möller’s resignation was prompted by a dramatic increase in spending early in Brandt’s term.

Besides being active in the SPD, Möller was director general of and Chief Executive Officer of the Karlsruher Lebensversicherung AG. Hence, his nickname was Genosse Generaldirektor (roughly: Comrade director general), which he also used as a title of his memoirs (1978).

Möller is an honorary citizen of Karlsruhe, where he died.
