= Daniel Born =

German politician (born 1975)

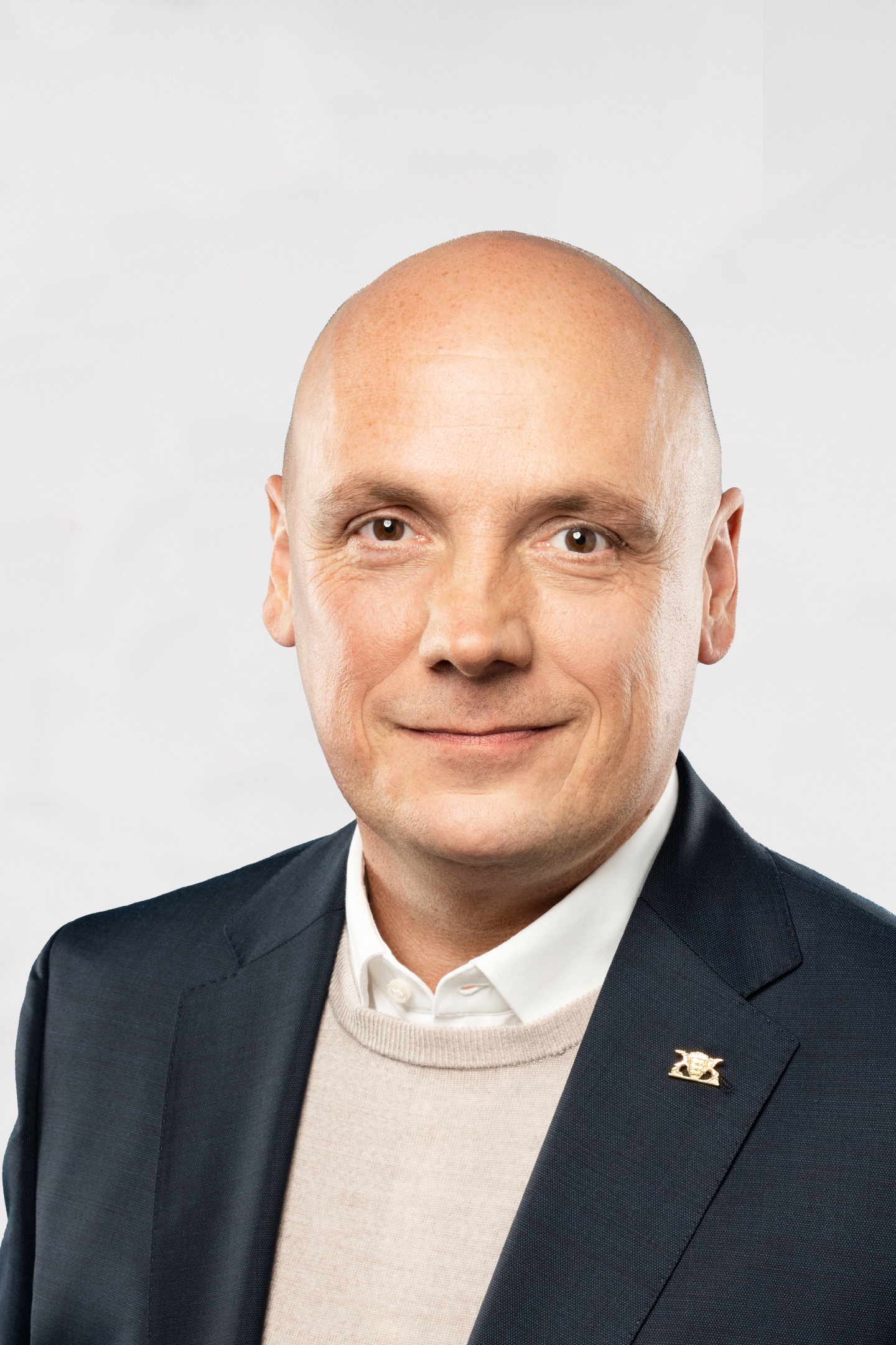
- Born in 2021

Member of the Landtag of Baden-Württemberg
- Incumbent
- Assumed office 11 May 2016
- Constituency: Schwetzingen

Personal details
- Born: 17 September 1975 (age 50) Speyer
- Party: Social Democratic Party (since 1991)

Daniel Born (born 17 September 1975 in Speyer) is a German politician serving as a member of the Landtag of Baden-Württemberg since 2016. From 2021 to 2025, he served as vice president of the Landtag.
