= Karl Schiller =

German scientist and politician (1911–1994)

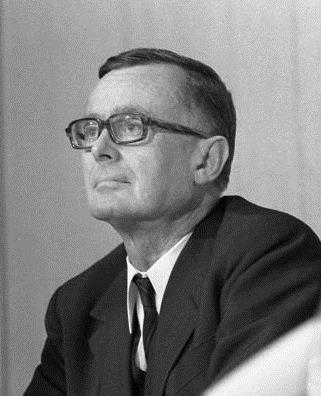
- Schiller in 1969

Minister of Finance
- In office 13 May 1971 – 7 July 1972
- Preceded by: Alexander Möller
- Succeeded by: Helmut Schmidt

Minister of Economic Affairs
- In office 1 December 1966 – 7 July 1972
- Preceded by: Kurt Schmücker
- Succeeded by: Helmut Schmidt

Personal details
- Born: Karl August Fritz Schiller; 24 April 1911 Breslau, Prussia, German Empire
- Died: 26 December 1994 (aged 83) Hamburg, Germany
- Party: Social Democratic Party of Germany
- Education: University of Heidelberg
- Occupation: Politician, economist

Karl August Fritz Schiller (24 April 1911 – 26 December 1994) was a German economist and politician of the Social Democratic Party (SPD). From 1966 to 1972, he was Federal Minister of Economic Affairs and from 1971 to 1972 Federal Minister of Finance. He was the inventor of the magic square, depicting Economic equilibrium, and of the Concerted activity (Konzertierte Aktion) to reflate the German market. He is thus seen as one of the most influential German economists beside Ludwig Erhard.

== Education and career ==
Schiller was born in Breslau. From 1931, after passing the Abitur, he studied economics and law at Kiel, Frankfurt, Berlin and Heidelberg. In 1935, he finished his studies and got his doctorate in politics. From 1935 to 1941, he researched at the Institut für Weltwirtschaft in Kiel. In 1939, Schiller made his habilitation. After taking part in World War II as a soldier from 1941 to 1945, he became professor at the University of Hamburg, where he became principal from 1956 to 1958. In the meantime, from 1948 to 1966, he was a member of the scientific advisory board of the Federal Ministry for Economics.

== Political career ==
Schiller joined the paramilitary Stormtroopers (Sturmabteilung) of the NSDAP in 1933 and the party itself in 1937. After World War II he joined the SPD in 1946.

From 1965 to 1972, he was a member of the Bundestag for the SPD, where he became assistant chairman of the SPD faction.

From 1948 to 1953, Schiller was Senator for economy in Hamburg and held the same office again from 1961 to 1965 in Berlin serving under mayor Willy Brandt in his second term of office.

From 1966 to 1969, he was Federal Minister of Economic Affairs in the grand coalition under Bundeskanzler Kurt Georg Kiesinger, and worked together with Franz Josef Strauß, then Federal Minister of Finance, in the Concerted activity. In this time, they were known as Plisch und Plum after figures invented by Wilhelm Busch.

In the first cabinet of Willy Brandt, Schiller continued to serve in the previous position, and was also Federal Minister of Finance from 1971 to 1972 after the resignation of Alex Möller. On 7 July 1972 Schiller resigned in protest against Brandt's economic decisions. After stepping down, he soon left the SPD as well. In 1972, he participated together with Ludwig Erhard in a CDU campaign, whereby both acted as defenders of market economy. In 1980 he returned to the SPD. He died in Hamburg.

As Finance Minister Schiller travelled to the Soviet Union in 1970 and met with Alexei Kosygin, the Premier of the Soviet Union, to discuss a trade agreement between their two respective countries.

== Honours ==
In 1991, Schiller was honoured with the Bundesverdienstkreuz (Grand Cross with Star and Sash).

Karl-Schiller Berufskolleg is a vocational college in Dortmund named after Schiller. The school was renamed for Schiller in 1999.
