= Olav Gutting =

German politician (born 1970)

Olav Gutting MdB
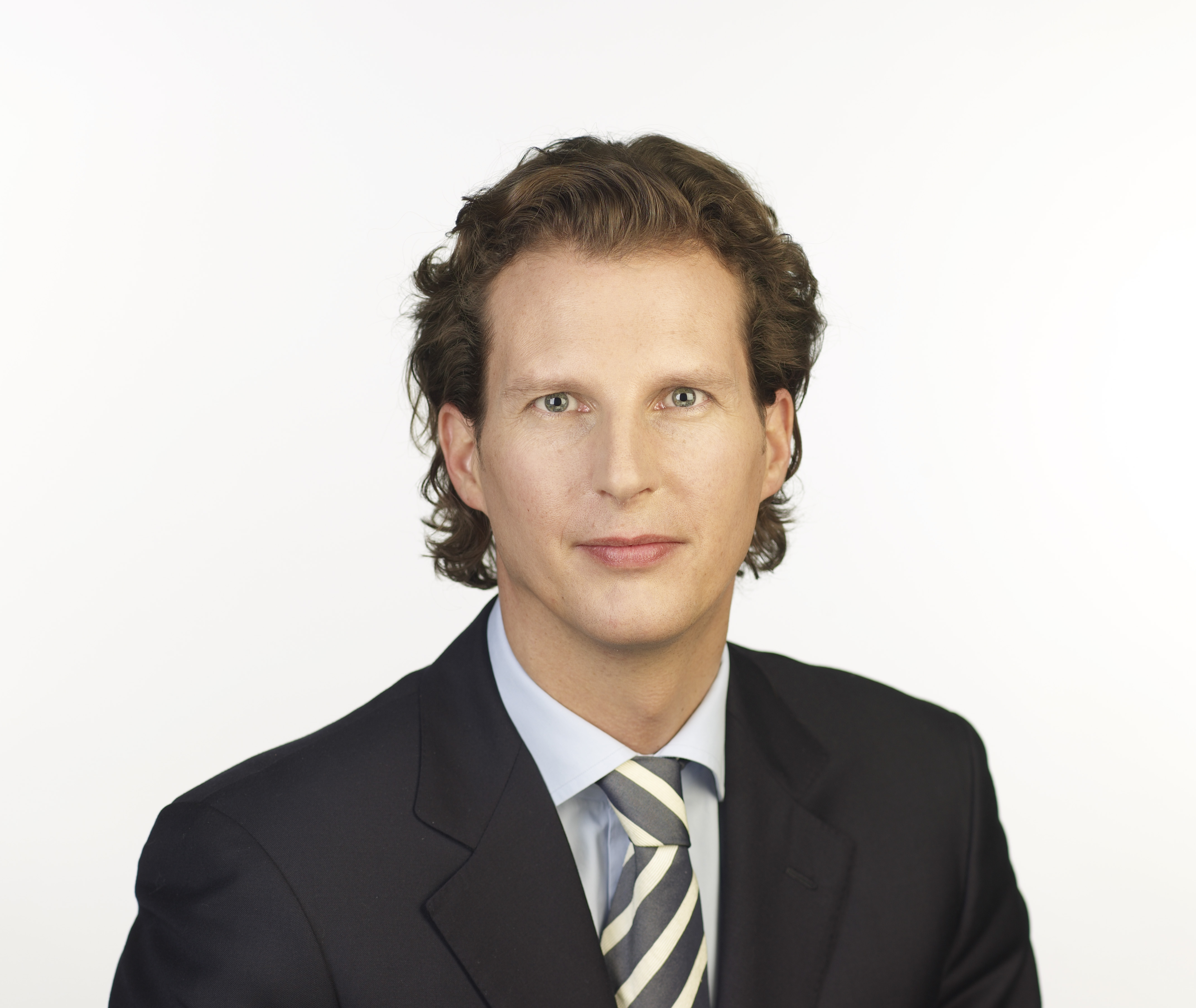
- Gutting in 2009

Member of the Bundestag; for Bruchsal – Schwetzingen
- Incumbent
- Assumed office 17 October 2002
- Preceded by: Constituency established

Personal details
- Born: 14 October 1970 (age 56) Bruchsal, West Germany (now Germany)
- Party: Christian Democratic Union
- Children: 1
- Education: University of Mannheim; Stetson University; Heidelberg University

Olav Steffen Gutting (born 14 October 1970) is a German lawyer and politician of the Christian Democratic Union (CDU) who has been serving as a member of the Bundestag since 2002.

== Early life and education ==
Gutting was born 1970 in the West German town of Bruchsal. His father Dieter Gutting is a laywer. He studied jurisprudence at the University of Mannheim.

He has been admitted to the bar as a lawyer since 2000, and since 2018, he has also been a certified specialist lawyer for inheritance law.

He, his father Dieter Gutting and his wife Diana Gutting run a law firm specializing in inheritance law and tax Consultanting Oberhausen-Rheinhausen.

== Political career ==
Gutting joined the Junge Union in 1986. In 2001 Gutting entered the CDU and became already in 2002 nominee of his party in the electoral ward of Bruchsal – Schwetzingen. He has been a member of the Bundestag since the 2002 elections, representing Bruchsal – Schwetzingen.

In parliament, Gutting has been serving on the Finance Committee. In this capacity, he is his parliamentary group’s rapporteur on the so-called solidarity surcharge (Solidaritätszuschlag or Soli). In 2026, he also joined the Budget Committee.

Within the CDU/CSU parliamentary group, Gutting was part of the leadership from 2013 to 2021, under successive chairmen Volker Kauder (2013-2018) and Ralph Brinkhaus (2018–2021). He was one of the MPs who voted for Brinkhaus to oust Kauder in 2018. Later that year, he ran for the post of deputy chairman but lost against Andreas Jung.

== Other activities ==
=== Corporate boards ===
- Nuclear Waste Disposal Fund (KENFO), Member of the Board of Trustees (since 2022)
- KfW, Member of the Board of Supervisory Directors (since 2019)
- Volksbank Kraichgau, Member of the Supervisory Board (2015 - 2021)

=== Lobby organizations ===
- German Association for Small and Medium-Sized Businesses (BVMW), Member of the Political Advisory Board (since 2022)

=== Non-profit organizations ===
- World League for Freedom and Democracy, Member of the Germany Chapter's Board

== Political positions ==
Within the CDU, Gutting is regarded as critic of Chancellor Angela Merkel's decision to enter into a coalition government with the center-left Social Democratic Party (SPD) after the 2017 elections. In June 2017, he voted against Germany's introduction of same-sex marriage. In early 2020, he co-founded an informal cross-party group of MPs from the CDU, CSU and FDP parties who opposed a potential coalition government between CDU/CSU and the Green Party.

Ahead of the Christian Democrats’ leadership election, Gutting publicly endorsed in 2020 Friedrich Merz to succeed Annegret Kramp-Karrenbauer as the party's chair; he later also expressed support for a candidacy of Jens Spahn.

For several years, Gutting has been among the members of the Union parliamentary group who were accused of lobbying on behalf of Azerbaijani president Ilham Aliyev.
