= Karl A. Lamers =

German politician

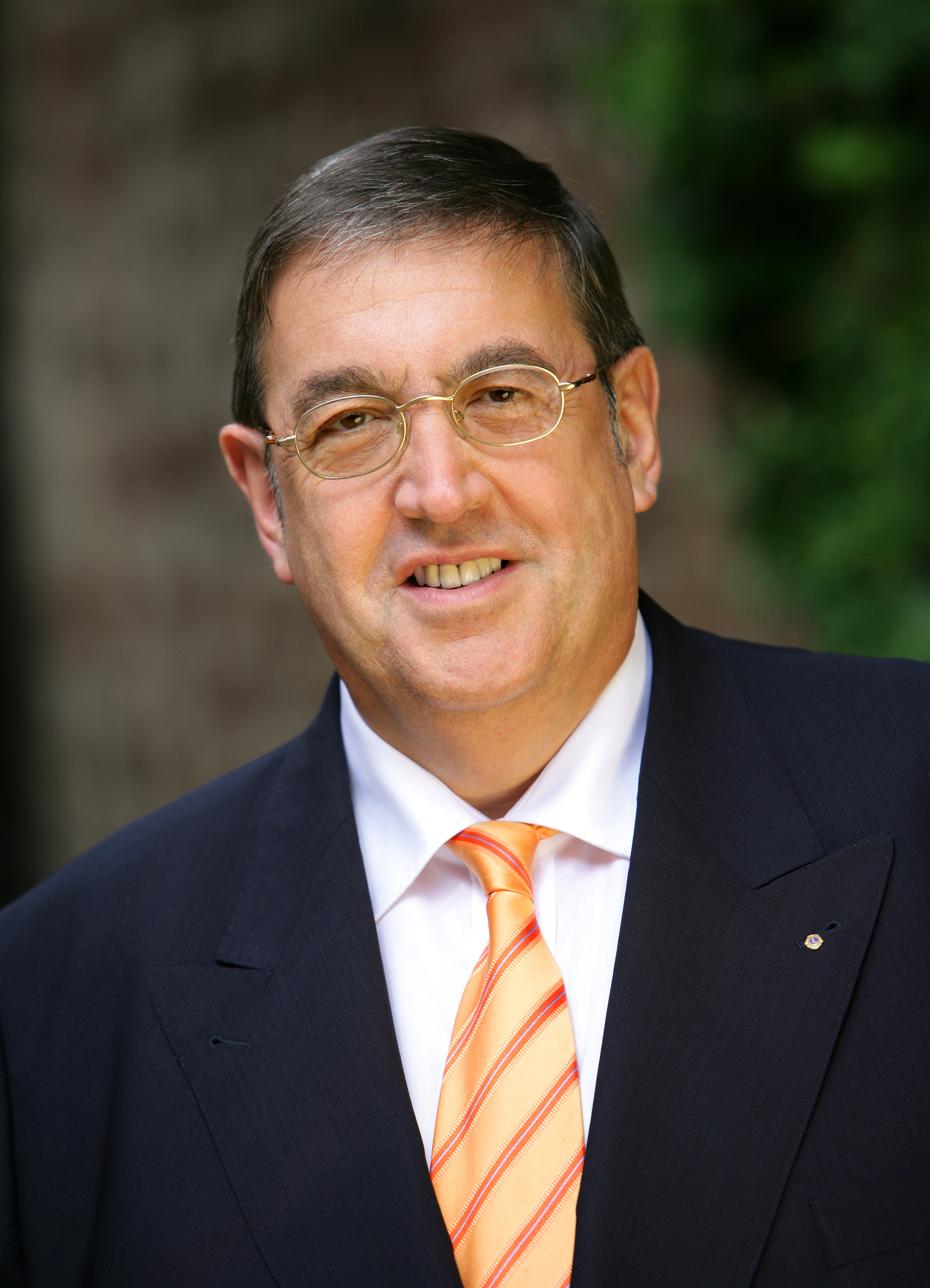
- Lamers in 2005

Member of the Bundestag; from Baden-Württemberg
- In office 10 November 1994 – 26 October 2021
- Preceded by: Udo Ehrbar
- Succeeded by: Franziska Brantner
- Constituency: Heidelberg (1994–1998); State list (1998–2005); Heidelberg (2005–2021)

President of the NATO Parliamentary Assembly
- In office 2010–2012
- Preceded by: John Tanner
- Succeeded by: Hugh Bayley

Personal details
- Born: 12 February 1951 (age 75) Duisburg, West Germany
- Party: Christian Democratic Union
- Education: University of Münster

Karl A. Lamers (born 12 February 1951) is a German politician of the Christian Democratic Union (CDU) who served as a member of the German Parliament from 1994 until 2021. From 2010 to 2012 he was the President of the NATO Parliamentary Assembly.

== Education and career ==
After completing his Abitur in 1969, Lamers studied law at the University of Münster. He passed his First State Examination in Münster and obtained a doctorate in law in 1976, with a dissertation called "Representation and integration of foreign nationals in the Federal Republic of Germany with special regard to suffrage – also a comparative study about local election rights in the member states of the European Communities". Subsequently, he passed the Second State Examination and became a research associate at the Max Planck Institute for Comparative Public Law and International Law in Heidelberg. Later on he became a senior Beamter at the Landtag of Baden-Württemberg, serving as the Head of the Office of the President of the Landtag. Karl A. Lamers is registered as practising lawyer in Heidelberg.

== Political involvement ==
Lamers became a member of the Christian Democratic Union and its youth division, the Junge Union (JU), in 1975. From 1981 to 1986 he acted as deputy state chairman of the Junge Union Baden-Württemberg under its State Chairman Günther Oettinger, who later became Minister-President of the state of Baden-Württemberg and is currently serving as European Commissioner for Energy. Since 2003, Lamers is honorary chairman of the CDU division of Heidelberg after being its chairman from 1985 to 2003 and a member of the Municipal Council of Heidelberg 1987 to 1995.

== Member of Parliament ==
In 1994, Lamers got elected to the Bundestag for the first time by directly winning the Heidelberg constituency. In 1998 and 2002 he won a seat through his placing on the CDU Party List of Baden-Württemberg in Germany's mixed member proportional representation voting system. Lamers directly won his constituency again in 2005 and 2009, receiving 36,1% of the votes in 2009.

Lamers was elected Deputy Chairman of the Defence Committee of the Bundestag in 2005 and is still holding this office. He is a member of the NATO Parliamentary Assembly since 1998 and was elected its president in Warsaw on 16 November 2010. Lamers also acted as President of the Atlantic Treaty Association from 2008 to 2014, succeeding Robert E. Hunter, who held the office from 2003 to 2008.

In March 2019, Lamers announced that he would not stand in the 2021 federal elections and resign from active politics by the end of the parliamentary term.
