= Karl Weber (politician, born 1936) =

German politician (1936–2026)

Member of the; Landtag of Baden-Württemberg; for Heidelberg
- In office 3 June 1980 – 10 June 1992
- Preceded by: Wilhelm Hahn
- Succeeded by: Brigitte Unger-Soyka

Member of the Bundestag; from Baden-Württemberg
- In office 20 October 1969 – 4 November 1980
- Preceded by: Multi-member district
- Succeeded by: Hartmut Soell
- Constituency: State list (1969–1976); Heidelberg-Stadt (1976–1980)

Personal details
- Born: 26 February 1936 Heidelberg, Germany
- Died: 12 July 2026 (aged 90) Heidelberg, Germany
- Party: Christian Democratic Union

Karl Weber (26 February 1936 – 12 July 2026) was a German politician of the Christian Democratic Union (CDU) and former member of the German Bundestag.

== Life and career ==
Weber joined the Junge Union and the CDU in 1956. From 1959 to 1965 he was district chairman of the Heidelberg JU, from 1965 to 1970 chairman of the Nordbaden JU and from 1966 deputy chairman of the Baden-Württemberg JU.

From 1969 to 1980 he was a member of the German Bundestag. In 1969 and 1972 Weber was elected via the state list of the CDU Baden-Württemberg, and in 1976 he was able to win the direct mandate in constituency 181 (Heidelberg City). In Parliament he was a member of the Committee on Transport and Postal and Telecommunications Affairs until May 1979.

From 1980 to 1992, Weber was a member of the state parliament of Baden-Württemberg; in the state elections of 1980, 1984 and 1988, he won the direct mandate in constituency 34 (Heidelberg).

Weber died on 12 July 2026, at the age of 90.

== Literature ==
Herbst, Ludolf; Jahn, Bruno (2002). Vierhaus, Rudolf (ed.). Biographisches Handbuch der Mitglieder des Deutschen Bundestages. 1949–2002 [Biographical Handbook of the Members of the German Bundestag. 1949–2002] (in German). München: De Gruyter - De Gruyter Saur. p. 1715. ISBN 978-3-11-184511-1.
