= Brühl (Baden) =

- Municipality
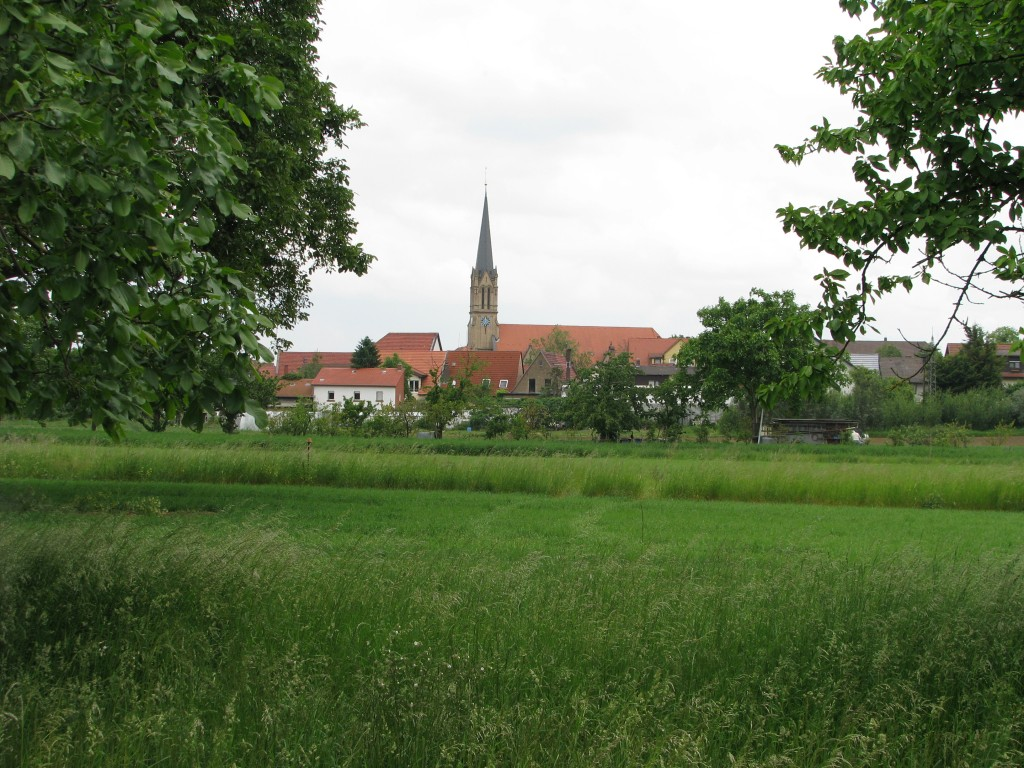

- Coat of arms

- Location of Brühl within Rhein-Neckar-Kreis district
- Interactive map of Brühl
- Location within Germany Location within Baden-Württemberg
- Coordinates: 49°24′N 08°32′E
- Country: Germany
- State: Baden-Württemberg
- Admin. region: Karlsruhe
- District: Rhein-Neckar-Kreis

Government
  - Mayor (2022–30): Ralf Göck (SPD)

Area
  - Total: 10.19 km^{2} (3.93 sq mi)
- Elevation: 102 m (335 ft)

Population (2025-12-31)
  - Total: 14,567
  - Density: 1,430/km^{2} (3,702/sq mi)
- Time zone: UTC+01:00 (CET)
  - Summer (DST): UTC+02:00 (CEST)
- Postal codes: 68782
- Dialling codes: 06202
- Vehicle registration: HD
- Website: bruehl-baden.de

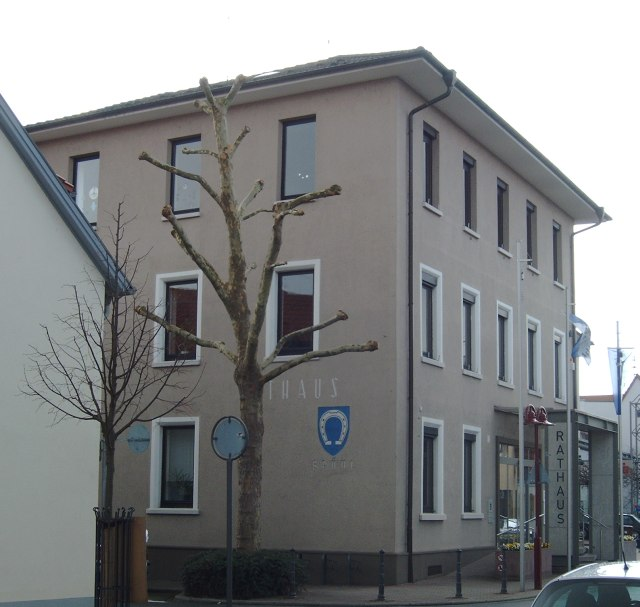
Town hall

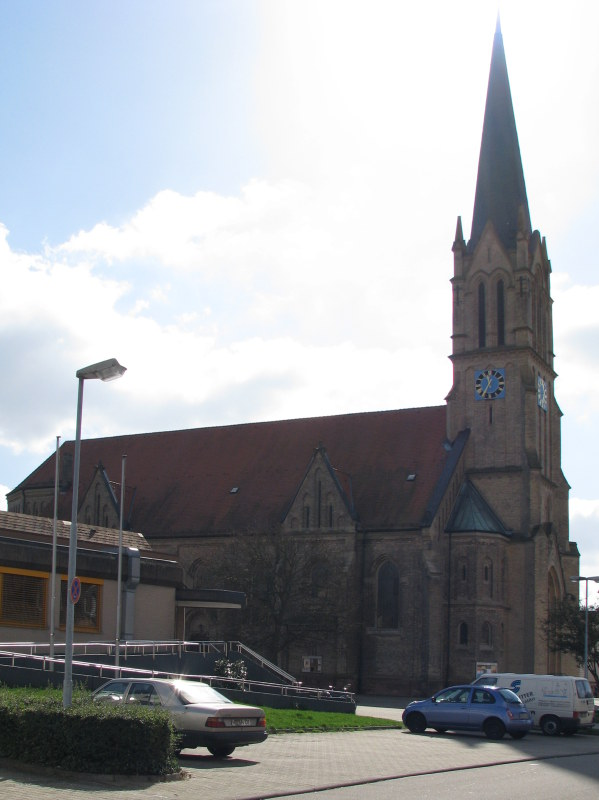
Catholic church

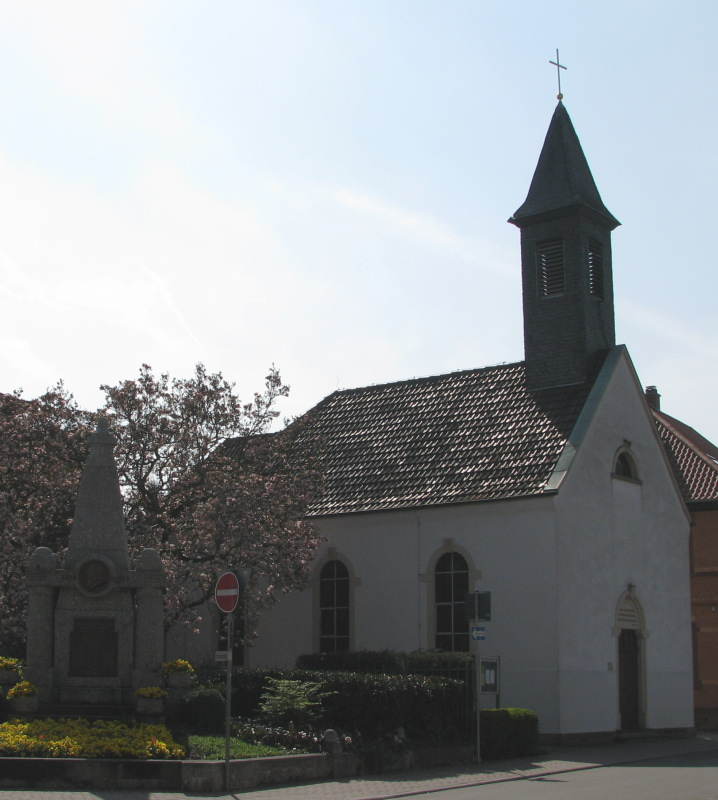
Protestant church

Brühl (pronounced [bʁyːl]) is a municipality in the Rhein-Neckar district of Baden-Württemberg, Germany. The former fishing village along the Rhine has become a satellite of a growing Mannheim. Many of the residents of Brühl work in Mannheim. Brühl is known as the hometown of former tennis player Steffi Graf.

== Geography ==
Mannheim lies directly on Brühl's northern border. The Rhine is to the west near the confluence of the Leimbach. The peninsular Koller Island (Kollerinsel) is one of the few pieces of land on the left bank of the Rhine that belong to Baden-Württemberg. This 4 km^{2} area is part of Brühl. It borders the communities of Altrip, Waldsee, and Otterstadt. To the south is Ketsch and to the east is Schwetzingen.

The municipality consists of two boroughs:

- Brühl
- Rohrhof

== History ==
Rohrhof was first mentioned in documents in 976. This was the occasion of a gift from emperor Otto II to Hanno, the bishop of Worms. Brühl (Bruowele) was first mentioned in a document listing the income of the bishop of Speyer in 1157. From 1405 until 1600, the lords of Handschuhsheim governed the land as a temporal fief from Speyer and the Electorate of the Palatinate of the Rhine. This division of temporal and spiritual dominion (condominium) ended with a treaty in which Speyer withdrew its worldly rights in 1709. In 1803 the towns became part of Baden. In 1878 the two independent communities of Brühl and Rohrhof were unified. In 1944 a part of Rohrhof was given to Mannheim.

Live and celebrate on the Rhine is the motto of the communities jubilee, "850 Years Brühl" on 13 March 2007.

=== Population ===
Year	Population
1880	890
1910	1700
1925	3489
1950	5648
1976	11,967
1993	14,000
2003	14,303

== Government ==
=== Municipal council ===
Municipal Council 2004
Party	Votes	Seats
CDU	42.77 %	10
SPD	21.79 %	5
Independent (Freiewähler)	19.12 %	4
Green	9.72 %	2
Citizens' Association	4.31 %	1
FDP	2.29 %	0
Voter Participation: 54.01%

=== Mayors ===
A partial list of the mayors of Brühl:

- 1849–1870 Michael Lindner
- 1870–1897 Wilhelm Eder
- 1897–1973 ...
- 1973–1981 Gerhard Stratthaus (CDU)
- 1982–1998 Günther Reffert (CDU)
- 1998–to present Ralf Göck (SPD), he was reelected in 2006 and 2014.

=== Coat of arms ===
Azure with a horseshoe argent. The horseshoe was first documented on a road-side shrine in 1496. Later it appeared on all the seals of the community. In 1911 the coat of arms was officially awarded to Brühl by the General State Archive. The white and blue colors refer to the lords of the Electorate of the Palatinate of the Rhine, the Wittelsbachs.

The flag is white and blue and was awarded by the Ministry of the Interior in 1960.

=== Sister cities ===
- Ormesson-sur-Marne, France since 1977
- (Germany) Weixdorf, Saxony since 1993, which has been a borough of Dresden since 1999
- Dourtenga, Burkina Faso since 1997

== Culture and sights ==
=== Sport ===
- TV Brühl, a gymnastics club with the following work groups:
  - Gymnastics
  - Handball
  - Table tennis
  - Volleyball
- FV Brühl, a football club with the following work groups:
  - Football
  - Track and field

=== Leisure facilities ===
Brühl has a heated outdoor community swimming pool and an indoor swimming pool. There is a youth center in Rennerswald.

=== Events ===
- Two fishing festivals
- On the anniversary of the consecration of the church, Brühl has a street festival.
- The Rohrhof Summer Festival

== Notable natives ==
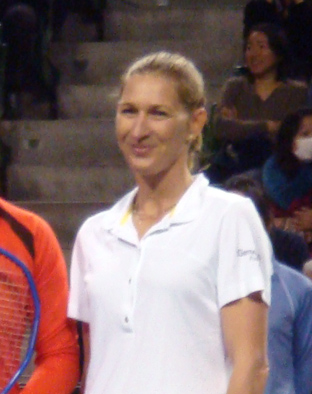
Steffi Graf

- Steffi Graf, professional tennis player. Graf was actually born in Mannheim but moved with her family to Brühl at the age of nine.

=== Honorary citizens ===
The following were named honorary citizens in the year mentioned:

- 1905: Johann Baptist Eder (1839-1918) was born in Brühl and possessed a brick layer. He was a deputy of the second chamber of the Baden Landtag. There he set out for the construction of the railway line to Brühl.
- 1934: Karl Mark (1873-1951) was almost 28 years teacher, long time also school rector, in Brühl. He also worked as a chorus conductor for a long time.
- 1973: Alfred Körber (1908-1998) was mayor of Brühl for 25 years. During his term of office, the construction and the rapid growth of the community took place after the Second World War.
- 1988: Steffi Graf (born 1969) was one of the best and most successful women tennis players in the world.
- 1993: Karl Maurer (1919-2009) volunteered for decades in Brühl. He was a member of the Council for more than 40 years, long chairman of the CDU and member of the parish council.
- 1998: Olivier d'Ormesson (1918-2002) was mayor of Brühl's French partner community Ormesson-sur-Marne and co-founder of the partnership.
- 2002: Gerhard Stratthaus (born 1942) was mayor of Brühl and chairman of the foundation Brühl citizens in need . Even as Mayor of Schwetzingen and Finance Minister of Baden-Württemberg, he always kept his residence in Brühl.
- 2004: Gerd Stauffer (born 1938) was a decade-old for the CDU in the Brühl municipal council and almost 30 years honorary first mayor-in-office.
- 2008: Günther Reffert (born 1938) was mayor of Brühl for 16 years. In his term, the reduction of municipal debt started and the Villa Meixner became a cultural center.
- 2008: Hans Motzenbäcker (born 1935) was for 32 years a CDU member of the Brühl municipal council and long-standing president of the FV Brühl as well as of the Badischen and the Süddeutschen Leichtathletikverbands (Baden and South German athletics associations)

== Other personalities ==
- Rio Reiser, bourgeois Ralph Christian Möbius, (1950-1996), musician, of the band Ton Steine Scherben, lived with his family in the 1950s in Brühl and was trained here.
- Maurizio Gaudino (born 1966 in Brühl), former national football player

== Sources ==
- Translated and edited from de:Brühl (Baden), 16 Dec 2006
