= Plankstadt =

- Municipality
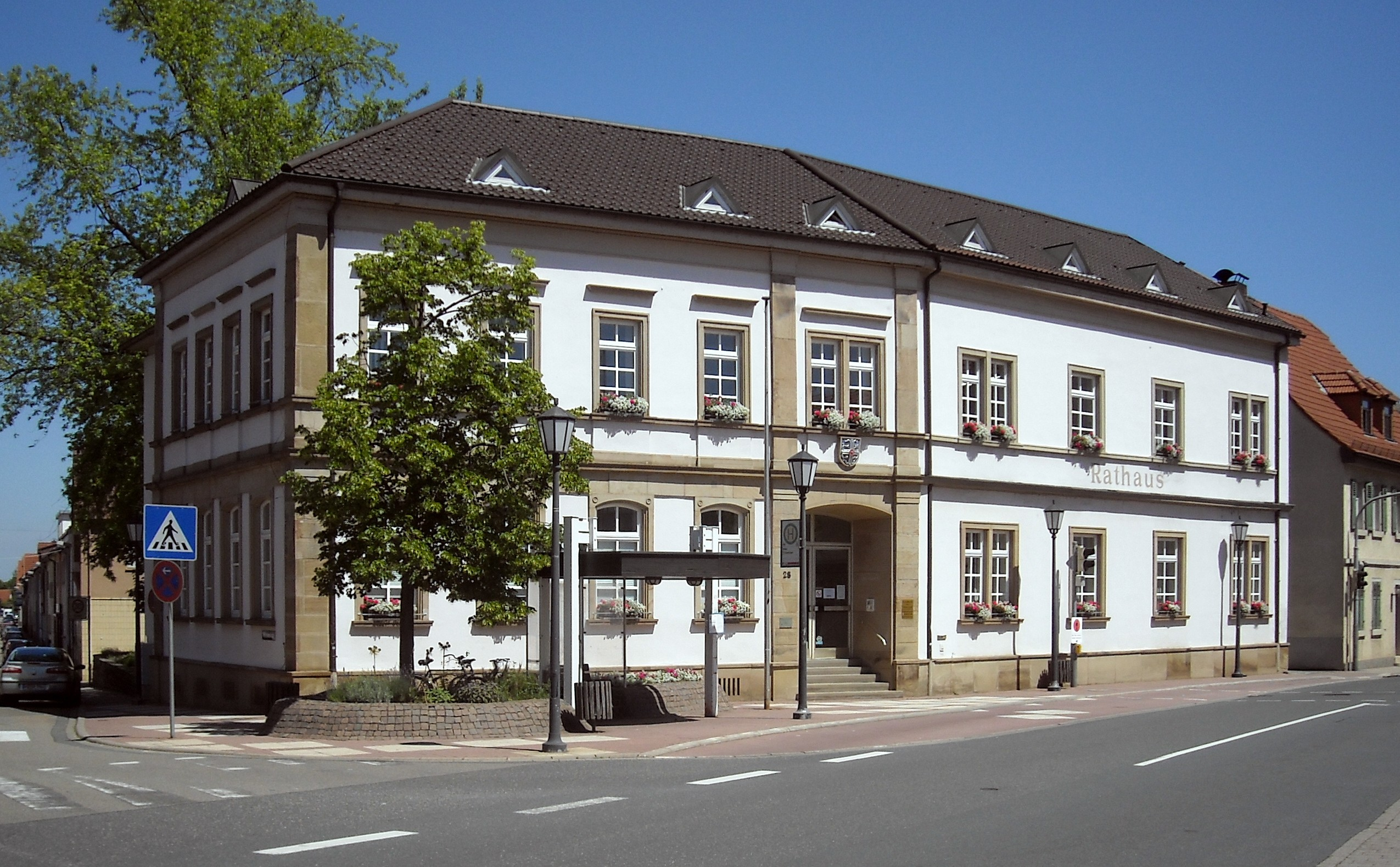
- Town hall

- Coat of arms

- Location of Plankstadt within Rhein-Neckar-Kreis district
- Interactive map of Plankstadt
- Location within Germany Location within Baden-Württemberg
- Coordinates: 49°23′36″N 08°35′39″E
- Country: Germany
- State: Baden-Württemberg
- Admin. region: Karlsruhe
- District: Rhein-Neckar-Kreis

Government
  - Mayor (2016–24): Nils Drescher

Area
  - Total: 8.39 km^{2} (3.24 sq mi)
- Elevation: 103 m (338 ft)

Population (2025-12-31)
  - Total: 10,714
  - Density: 1,280/km^{2} (3,310/sq mi)
- Time zone: UTC+01:00 (CET)
  - Summer (DST): UTC+02:00 (CEST)
- Postal codes: 68723, 68739–68740
- Dialling codes: 06202
- Vehicle registration: HD
- Website: www.plankstadt.de

Plankstadt (German: [ˈplaŋkʃtat]) is a municipality in the district of Rhein-Neckar-Kreis, in Baden-Württemberg, Germany.
