= Oftersheim =

- Municipality
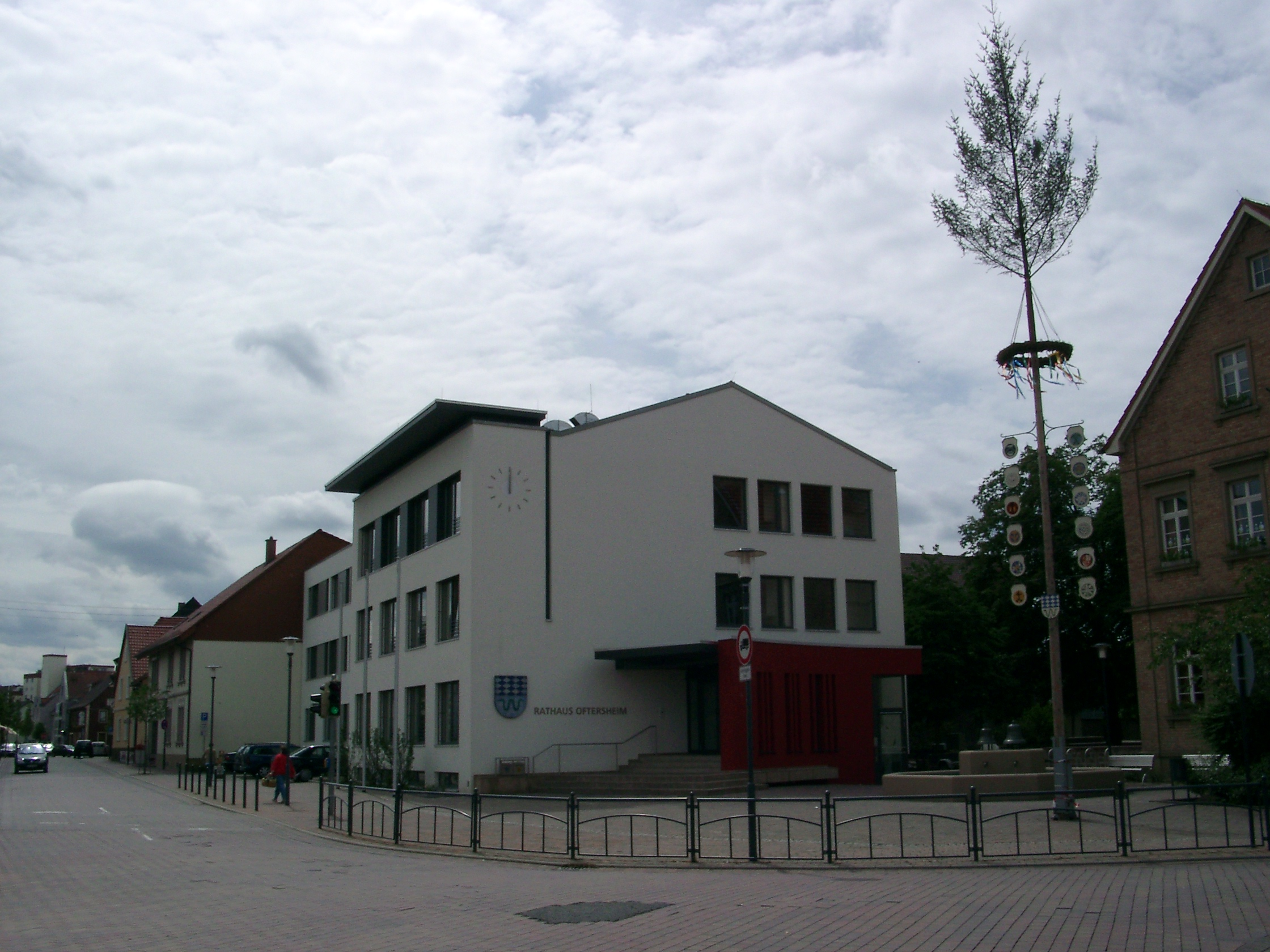

- Coat of arms

- Location of Oftersheim within Rhein-Neckar-Kreis district
- Interactive map of Oftersheim
- Location within Germany Location within Baden-Württemberg
- Coordinates: 49°22′14″N 08°35′05″E
- Country: Germany
- State: Baden-Württemberg
- Admin. region: Karlsruhe
- District: Rhein-Neckar-Kreis

Government
  - Mayor (2022–30): Pascal Seidel

Area
  - Total: 12.78 km^{2} (4.93 sq mi)
- Elevation: 101 m (331 ft)

Population (2025-12-31)
  - Total: 12,165
  - Density: 951.9/km^{2} (2,465/sq mi)
- Time zone: UTC+01:00 (CET)
  - Summer (DST): UTC+02:00 (CEST)
- Postal codes: 68723, 68735–68736
- Dialling codes: 06202
- Vehicle registration: HD
- Website: www.oftersheim.de

Oftersheim is a municipality in the district of Rhein-Neckar-Kreis, in Baden-Württemberg, Germany. It is situated 8 km southwest of Heidelberg.
