= Neulußheim =

- Municipality
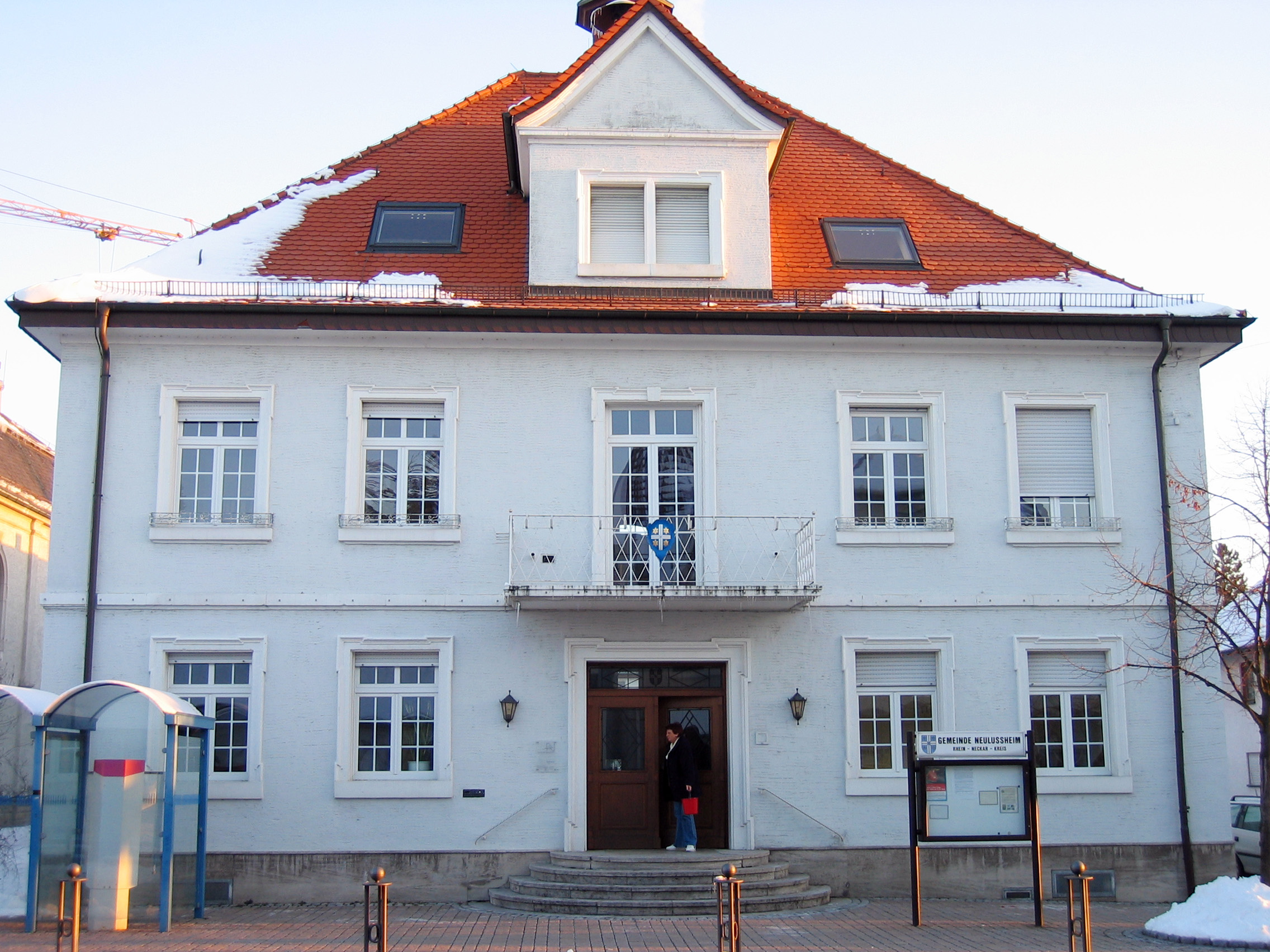
- Town hall

- Coat of arms

- Location of Neulußheim within Rhein-Neckar-Kreis district
- Interactive map of Neulußheim
- Location within Germany Location within Baden-Württemberg
- Coordinates: 49°17′36″N 08°31′19″E
- Country: Germany
- State: Baden-Württemberg
- Admin. region: Karlsruhe
- District: Rhein-Neckar-Kreis

Government
  - Mayor (2024–32): Kevin Weirether

Area
  - Total: 3.39 km^{2} (1.31 sq mi)
- Elevation: 105 m (344 ft)

Population (2025-12-31)
  - Total: 7,220
  - Density: 2,130/km^{2} (5,520/sq mi)
- Time zone: UTC+01:00 (CET)
  - Summer (DST): UTC+02:00 (CEST)
- Postal codes: 68805–68809
- Dialling codes: 06205
- Vehicle registration: HD
- Website: Neulussheim.de

Neulußheim is a town in the district of Rhein-Neckar in Baden-Württemberg in Germany, with about 7,100 inhabitants. Larger cities in the surrounding area include Speyer, Mannheim and Heidelberg. It was founded in 1711 at a crossroads by Julius Schickard. Due to the logistical advantage and the construction of a station on the Mannheim-Karlsruhe railway line in 1870, the hamlet rapidly increased in population. The railway station with an overhead crossing was built in 1984 by Gottfried Böhm, a famous German architect. In 2020, the German public broadcasting service "ZDF" published a documentary about the ongoing construction of two elevators and other restoration works at the station.

Notable sights include the "Turmuhrenmuseum" and the old railway station.

== Demographics ==
Population development:

Year	Inhabitants
1990	5,266
2001	6,367
2011	6,548
2021	7,133
