= Reilingen =

- Municipality
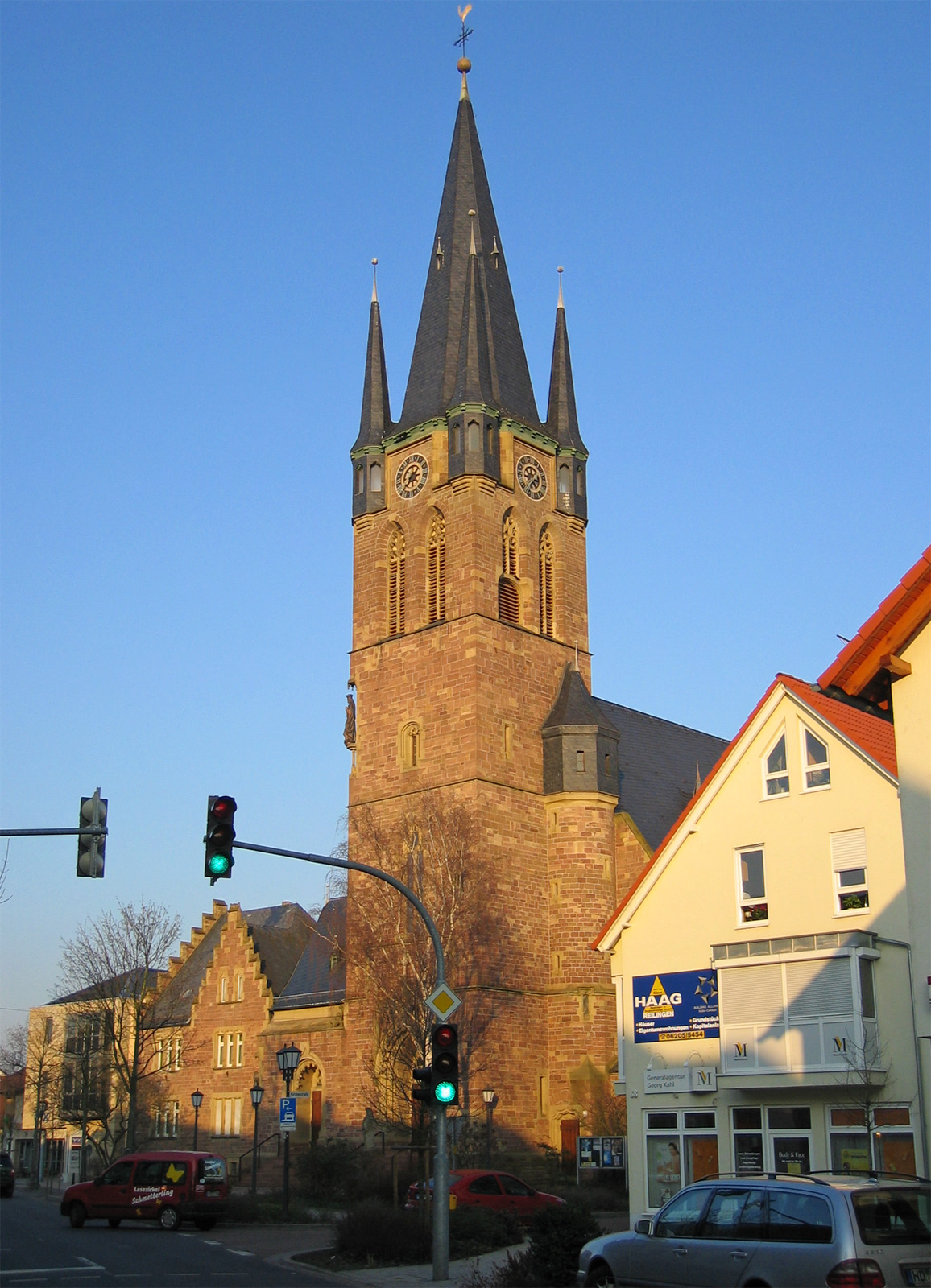
- Catholic church

- Coat of arms

- Location of Reilingen within Rhein-Neckar-Kreis district
- Interactive map of Reilingen
- Location within Germany Location within Baden-Württemberg
- Coordinates: 49°17′41″N 08°34′09″E
- Country: Germany
- State: Baden-Württemberg
- Admin. region: Karlsruhe
- District: Rhein-Neckar-Kreis

Government
  - Mayor (2021–29): Stefan Weisbrod

Area
  - Total: 16.35 km^{2} (6.31 sq mi)
- Elevation: 102 m (335 ft)

Population (2025-12-31)
  - Total: 8,299
  - Density: 507.6/km^{2} (1,315/sq mi)
- Time zone: UTC+01:00 (CET)
  - Summer (DST): UTC+02:00 (CEST)
- Postal codes: 68799
- Dialling codes: 06205
- Vehicle registration: HD
- Website: www.reilingen.de

Reilingen (German: [ˈʁaɪlɪŋən]) is a municipality in the district of Rhein-Neckar in Baden-Württemberg, Germany. It is located on Bertha Benz Memorial Route.
