= Ketsch =

- Municipality
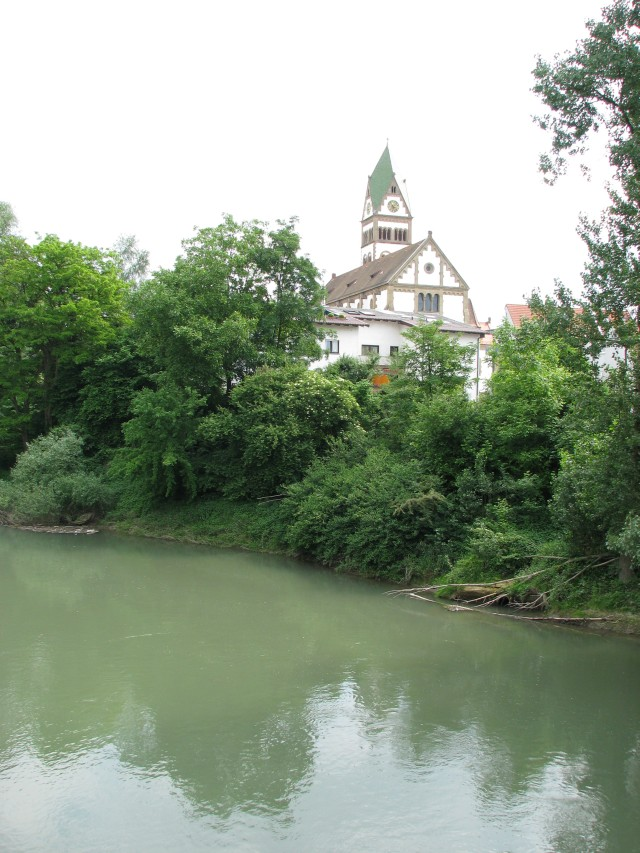
- Church

- Coat of arms

- Location of Ketsch within Rhein-Neckar-Kreis district
- Interactive map of Ketsch
- Location within Germany Location within Baden-Württemberg
- Coordinates: 49°21′57″N 08°32′01″E
- Country: Germany
- State: Baden-Württemberg
- Admin. region: Karlsruhe
- District: Rhein-Neckar-Kreis

Government
  - Mayor (2022–30): Timo Wangler (Ind.)

Area
  - Total: 16.52 km^{2} (6.38 sq mi)
- Elevation: 101 m (331 ft)

Population (2025-12-31)
  - Total: 13,154
  - Density: 796.2/km^{2} (2,062/sq mi)
- Time zone: UTC+01:00 (CET)
  - Summer (DST): UTC+02:00 (CEST)
- Postal codes: 68767–68775
- Dialling codes: 06202
- Vehicle registration: HD
- Website: www.ketsch.de

Ketsch (German pronunciation: [kɛtʃ]) is a municipality in the district of Rhein-Neckar-Kreis, in Baden-Württemberg, Germany, located on Bertha Benz Memorial Route. It is situated on the right bank of the Rhine, 14 km south of Heidelberg.

== Demographics ==
Population development:

Year	Inhabitants
1990	12,509
2001	12,971
2011	12,617
2021	12,995
