= Bruchsal (electoral district) =

State electoral district of Germany

29: Bruchsal
- Electoral district for the Landtag of Baden-Württemberg
- Bruchsal in 2026
- District: Karlsruhe
- Electorate: 114,983 (2026)
- Major settlements: Bad Schönborn, Bruchsal, Forst, Hambrücken, Karlsdorf-Neuthard, Kronau, Oberhausen-Rheinhausen, Östringen, Philippsburg, Ubstadt-Weiher, and Waghäusel

Current electoral district
- Party: CDU
- Member: Thorsten Schwarz

Bruchsal is an electoral constituency (German: Wahlkreis) represented in the Landtag of Baden-Württemberg. Since 2026, it has elected one member via first-past-the-post voting. Voters cast a second vote under which additional seats are allocated proportionally state-wide. Under the constituency numbering system, it is designated as constituency 29. It is wholly within the district of Karlsruhe.

== Geography ==
The constituency includes the municipalities of Bad Schönborn, Bruchsal, Forst, Hambrücken, Karlsdorf-Neuthard, Kronau, Oberhausen-Rheinhausen, Östringen, Philippsburg, Ubstadt-Weiher, and Waghäusel, within the district of Karlsruhe.

There were 114,983 eligible voters in 2026.

== Members ==
=== First mandate ===
Both prior to and since the electoral reforms for the 2026 election, the winner of the plurality of the vote (first-past-the-post) in every constituency won the first mandate.

Election	Member	Party	%
1976	Heinz Heckmann	CDU	
1980	Heinz Heckmann	CDU	
1984	Heinz Heckmann	CDU	
1988	Heinz Heckmann	CDU	
1992	Heribert Rech	CDU	
1996	Heribert Rech	CDU	
2001	Heribert Rech	CDU	52.8
2006	Heribert Rech	CDU	49.0
2011	Heribert Rech	CDU	44.3
2016	Ulli Hockenberger	CDU	30.0
2021	Ulli Hockenberger	CDU	27.1
2026	Thorsten Schwarz	CDU	35.1

=== Second mandate ===
Prior to the electoral reforms for the 2026 election, the seats in the state parliament were allocated proportionately amongst parties which received more than 5% of valid votes across the state. The seats that were won proportionally for parties that did not win as many first mandates as seats they were entitled to, were allocated to their candidates which received the highest proportion of the vote in their respective constituencies. This meant that following some elections, a constituency would have one or more members elected under a second mandate.

Prior to 2011, these second mandates were allocated to the party candidates who got the greatest number of votes, whilst from 2011-2021, these were allocated according to percentage share of the vote.

Prior to 1992, this constituency did not elect any members on a second mandate.

Election	Member	Party	Member	Party
1992	Walter Heiler	SPD	Heinz Troll	REP
1996	Walter Heiler	SPD	Heinz Troll	REP
2001				
2006	Walter Heiler	SPD		
2009	Walter Heiler	SPD	Friedhelm Ernst	FDP
2011	Walter Heiler	SPD		
2016			Rainer Balzer	AfD
2021			Rainer Balzer	AfD

== Election results ==
=== 2026 election ===
State election (2026): Bruchsal
Notes:	Blue background denotes the winner of the electorate vote. Pink background denotes a candidate elected from their party list. Yellow background denotes an electorate win by a list member, or other incumbent. A ✓ or ✗ denotes status of any incumbent, win or lose respectively.						
Party	Candidate	Votes	%	±%	Party votes	%	±%
CDU	Thorsten Schwarz	27,076	35.1	▲7.9	23,777	30.7	▲3.5
AfD	Tobias Dammert	17,788	23.0	▲9.9	17,307	22.3	▲9.1
Greens	Nicole Heger	15,862	20.6	▼5.7	19,421	25.0	▼1.3
SPD	Christian Holzer	10,017	13.0	▲1.2	5,053	6.5	▼5.3
Left	Saltanat Abduvaliev	3,252	4.2	▲1.6	2,840	3.7	▲1.0
FDP	Niclas Moldenhauer	3,184	4.1	▼5.6	2,935	3.8	▼5.9
FW					2,073	2.7	▼0.9
BSW					1,088	1.4	
APT					1,065	1.4	
Volt					661	0.9	▲0.4
PARTEI					352	0.5	▼1.5
dieBasis					172	0.2	▼0.9
Values					171	0.2	
Pensioners					158	0.2	
Bündnis C					142	0.2	
Team Todenhöfer					97	0.1	
PdF					69	0.1	
ÖDP					68	0.1	
Verjüngungsforschung					56	0.1	
KlimalisteBW					35	0.0	▼1.0
Humanists					34	0.0	
Informal votes		927			532		
Total valid votes		77,179			77,574		
Turnout		78,106	67.9	▲4.1			
CDU hold	Majority	9,288	12.1	▲11.3			

=== 2021 election ===
State election (2026): Bruschal
Party	Candidate	Votes	%	±%
CDU	Ulli Hockenberger	19,336	27.1	▼2.9
Greens	Nicole-Annette Heger	18,735	26.3	▲2.1
AfD	Rainer Balzer	9,379	13.2	▼6.5
SPD	Alexandra Nohl	8,392	11.8	▼0.1
FDP	Timo Imhof	6,920	9.7	▲1.5
FW	Alexander Geyer	2,531	3.6	
Left	Alena Schmitt	1,867	2.6	▲0.2
PARTEI	Jens Dänner	1,371	1.9	▲0.7
WiR2020	Doris Rothermel	843	1.2	
dieBasis	Giorgio Mariotti	806	1.1	
KlimalisteBW	Lars Benke	739	1.0	
Volt	Haci Firat Celik	338	0.5	
Majority		601	0.8	
Rejected ballots		759	1.1	▼0.2
Turnout		72,016	63.8	▼7.2
Registered electors		112,897		
CDU hold		Swing		

== See also ==
- Politics of Baden-Württemberg
- Landtag of Baden-Württemberg
