= Bruchsal =

- Town
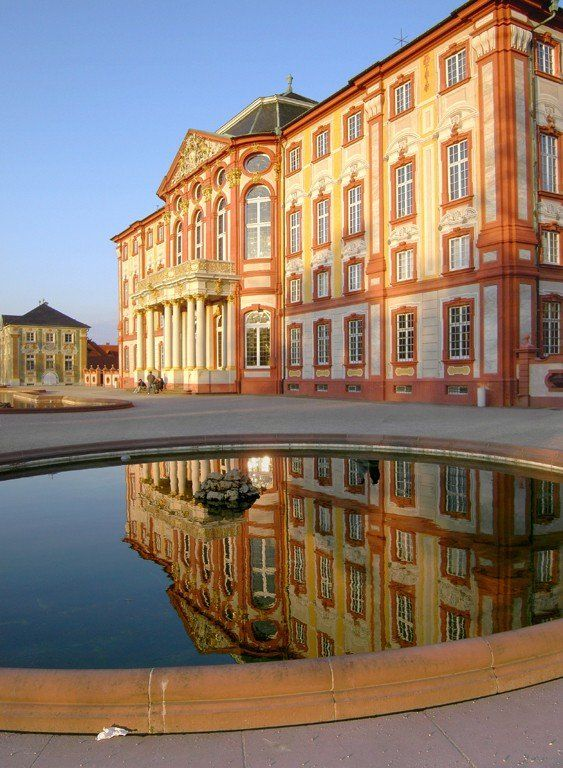

- Coat of arms
- Interactive map of Bruchsal
- Location within Germany Location within Baden-Württemberg
- Coordinates: 49°08′N 8°36′E
- Country: Germany
- State: Baden-Württemberg
- Admin. region: Karlsruhe
- District: Karlsruhe
- Subdivisions: 6

Government
  - Mayor: Cornelia Petzold-Schick (Greens)

Area
  - Total: 93.19 km^{2} (35.98 sq mi)
- Elevation: 114 m (374 ft)

Population (2025-12-31)
  - Total: 47,578
  - Density: 510.5/km^{2} (1,322/sq mi)
- Time zone: UTC+01:00 (CET)
  - Summer (DST): UTC+02:00 (CEST)
- Postal codes: 76601–76646
- Dialling codes: 07251 and 07257
- Vehicle registration: KA, BR
- Website: www.bruchsal.de

Bruchsal (German pronunciation: [ˈbʁʊxzaːl]; orig. Bruohselle, Bruaselle, historically known in English as Bruxhall) is a city at the western edge of the Kraichgau, approximately 20 km northeast of Karlsruhe in the state of Baden-Württemberg, Germany. It is located on Bertha Benz Memorial Route.

Bruchsal is the largest city in the district of Karlsruhe and is known for being Europe's largest asparagus producer and one of the economic centers of the region of Karlsruhe. The Bruchsal area also includes the cities and towns of Bad Schönborn, Forst, Hambrücken, Karlsdorf-Neuthard, Kraichtal, Kronau, Oberhausen-Rheinhausen, Östringen, Philippsburg, Ubstadt-Weiher and Waghäusel. Until 1972 Bruchsal was the seat of the district of Bruchsal, which was merged into the district of Karlsruhe as a result of the district reform, effective January 1, 1973.

Bruchsal's population passed the 20,000 mark around 1955. When the new Body of Municipal Law for Baden-Württemberg went into effect on April 1, 1956, the city was therefore immediately awarded Große Kreisstadt status. In addition, Bruchsal cooperates with the neighboring communities of Forst, Hambrücken and Karlsdorf-Neuthard in administrative matters.

== Geography ==
Bruchsal is located at the edge of the Upper Rhine River Plains and the Kraichgau along the Saalbach, which is a small tributary of the Rhine that joins it between Philippsburg and Oberhausen.

=== Neighboring communities ===
The following cities and towns share a border with Bruchsal. They all belong to the district of Karlsruhe and are listed clockwise, starting in the North: Forst (Baden), Ubstadt-Weiher, Kraichtal, Bretten, Gondelsheim, Walzbachtal, Weingarten (Baden), Stutensee and Karlsdorf-Neuthard. In addition the exclave of Bruchsal situated North of Karlsdorf-Neuthard shares borders with the towns of Graben-Neudorf, Waghäusel und Hambrücken.

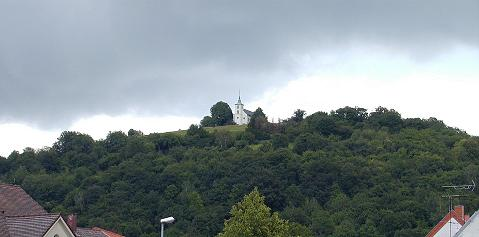
Michaelsberg (Michelsberg)

=== Boroughs ===
The city of Bruchsal is made up of Bruchsal proper along with the boroughs of Büchenau, Heidelsheim, Helmsheim, Obergrombach and Untergrombach.

A few neighborhoods within the city limits are known by their own name, but their limits are not precisely documented. Furthermore, former homesteads are located inside today's city limits. These often only consist of one or several buildings, such as Langental, Rohrbacher Hof, Scheckenbronnerhof, Staighof, Talmühle and Auf dem Michaelsberg in the borough of Untergrombach.

== History ==
=== Ancient era and early Middle Ages ===
Excavations and artifacts provide evidence of a settlement on the Michelsberg (Untergrombach) as early as 4000 BC during the Neolithic. In the core of Bruchsal the oldest settlement discovered was dated back to AD 640. It is located near today's Saint Peter's Church. The first mention of Bruchsal in official documents occurred in 976, when the king came to town. In October 980, Otto II and his court stayed at the king's palace in Bruchsal for several days.

=== Middle Ages ===
Henry II of Germany became ruler of Bruchsal in 1002 following the subjugation of his rival Herrmann of Swabia. In 1056 Henry III of Germany presented the settlement to the bishop of Speyer (Konrad I) as a gift. The city remained part the diocese until the German Mediatisation in 1802. It also was the seat of an administrative district that originally only consisted of the core of Bruchsal (i.e., the city as it existed prior to the various district reforms). In 1067 Henry IV resided in Bruchsal from time to time. 1248 was the first time Bruchsal was referred to as a city, and in 1278 Saint Peter's Church was mentioned for the first time. After extensive damage to both, the Palace and Saint Peter's Church were reconstructed in 1320. The Bergfried (an outlook and defensive tower bastion) was erected in 1358, and the city wall was completed in 1452. In 1460 the first coin was minted in Bruchsal.

=== 1501–1750 ===
In 1502 the first peasant revolt (Bundschuh), led by Joß Fritz of Untergrombach, chose Bruchsal as its target. Traitors to the rebellion allowed the authorities to take the revolt's leaders into custody. Ten were decapitated in the Bruchsal Palace courtyard. Joß Fritz got away and went into hiding in the Southern Black Forest. In 1525 the peasant revolts peaked. Inflation, hunger and the Plague added to the desperation, and the revolts were forcibly put down by the Prince. The known peasant leaders Hall, Wurm and the Minister Eisenhut were captured and decapitated in the Palace courtyard. During the 30 Years War in 1622 Bruchsal was completely destroyed, and in 1644 the French garrison in Philippsburg raided the city. In 1676 the French again destroyed parts of Bruchsal, and on August 10, 1689 the city was bombarded by the French general Duras and was completely destroyed. After that Bruchsal counted only 130 residents.

By April 24, 1711 Bruchsal had recovered sufficiently to play host to Prince Eugene of Savoy of the Habsburg Court in Vienna. Then in 1716 the Bishop of Speyer, Heinrich von Rollingen, moved his residence into the Bruchsal Palace. This move elevated the city's status to that of an official residence of the Diocese of Speyer. At the same time, Bruchsal became the seat of the "Vizedomamt", the most important office held by the Diocese on the West bank of the Rhine. In 1719 Cardinal Damian Hugo von Schönborn became the new Bishop, and after settling in he commissioned in (1722), among others, the new baroque château and the new Saint Peter's Church (from 1742). Both were built and, in part, designed by Balthasar Neumann. In the Bishop's honor, the Southern gate out of the château grounds is referred to as Damian's Gate to this day. In 1743 Franz Christof von Hutten, Schönborn's successor, completed the extensive construction of the baroque city of Bruchsal, by adding Damian's Gate, the military barracks and the Water Château (home to one of the city's two regional, college track high schools, the Schönborn Gymnasium).

=== 1751–1815 ===
In 1753 the Schönborn Gymnasium was founded by Bishop von Hutten. In 1770 the new Bishop, Count August von Limburg-Stirum, took up office. Bruchsal now counted 6,000 residents. In 1796 French troops occupied the city. German Mediatisation turned all property owned by the Prince-Bishopric of Speyer over to the House of Baden, and Bruchsal became the seat of the district court. The district then was divided and reunited several times through 1819.

In 1806 Princess Amalie of Baden, widow of the Hereditary Prince since 1801, took up residence in Bruchsal's baroque château and lived there until 1823. She had 8 children of whom 6 were daughters, and she was known as Europe's mother-in-law. Amalie's son, the later Grand Duke Karl, was married to Stéphanie de Beauharnais, a niece of Napoleon's wife Josephine per orders given by Napoleon himself. In 1812 Stephanie gave birth to a son, who died after 14 days. This was the origin of the legend of Kaspar Hauser's nobility. Amalie's daughter Louise was married to Alexander I of Russia and became the Russian Tsarina Elisabeth Alexeievna. Amalie's daughter Friedericke wed Gustaf IV Adolf to become Queen of Sweden (though she asked for and received asylum in Bruchsal after 1807 due to the coup d'état of her husband's government). Amalie's daughter Maria was married to the Duke of Braunschweig, and two other daughters were married to the regents of Bavaria and of Hessen-Darmstadt.

In 1815, after Napoleon's reign was over, Bruchsal and Amalie entertained the following company in the baroque château at Bruchsal until the dust settled: The Russian Tsar, Prince Metternich, the King of Prussia, as well as his son, the later Emperor of Germany.

=== 1816–1880 ===
In 1841 the Rhine Valley Railway was completed between Heidelberg, Bruchsal, and Karlsruhe. In 1848/1849 the Baden Revolution did manage to stray into Bruchsal a bit. While the revolutionaries (Gustav Struve, Lorenz Brentano, Amand Goegg and others) met in the château, the commoners freed prisoners from the just-completed prison. This prison, the Old Palace, was the scene of executions well into World War II and even later. On June 23, 1849, the revolution was quelled by Crown Prince Wilhelm at the battle of Ubstadt. 1856 brought gas lighting to Bruchsal, and the city received Baden's Guillotine. In 1864 the district of Philippsburg was merged with the Bruchsal district, which now belonged to the newly formed "Greater Karlsruhe." On June 1, 1869 the first German railway signal factory, Schnabel-Henning, was founded in Bruchsal. Later it was merged with Siemens AG, and the Franco-Prussian War of 1870 and 1871 made Bruchsal an important rail hub for the provisioning of German troops.

=== 1881–1945 ===
In 1881 a synagogue was built. The Industrial Revolution brought economic growth, mostly with the help of the railway and the area's tobacco and hops production. 1889 gave residents in Bruchsal their first telephones, and in 1906 the Prince-Styrum Hospital was built. The city's slaughterhouse opened in 1908, and World War I again turned Bruchsal into a major hub on the supply line for the troops. Immediately after the war, in 1919 and 1920 the city was wired for electricity. In 1934 the Autobahn was built between Heidelberg and Bruchsal, and in 1936 the Bretten district was merged with the Bruchsal district. In 1938 the Nazis destroyed the synagogue (in its place stands a fire station today) and the Jewish population were deported. In 1939 the District Bruchsal became the district of Bruchsal, which included 38 towns and cities, until it was merged into Karlsruhe (district) during the district reform of 1970. On the afternoon of March 1, 1945, Bruchsal was bombed by the Allies. At the time of the attack, the war was essentially over, with the front line only 20 km from the city limits and nearly no one left to defend it. To this day, that particular attack upsets residents as the consensus is that it was unnecessary and inconsequential to the outcome of the war. There are allegations that the attack by U.S. bombers was conducted in retaliation for the killing of a parachuted pilot by farmers. In addition to the 1,000 lives that perished that day, the entire inner city and the baroque château were destroyed. On April 2, 1945, allied forces took Bruchsal without resistance.

=== 1946 to the present ===
Starting from 1 April 1956 Bruchsal was awarded the Große Kreisstadt status, as its population had passed the 20,000 mark in 1955. Between 1971 and 1974 the local government reform incorporated 5 neighbouring communities into the city of Bruchsal, including the cities of Heidelsheim and Obergrombach. Under a further reform in 1973, Bruchsal was incorporated into the district of Karlsruhe. Thus Bruchsal lost its district seat status, though it still remains a major economic centre of the region.

=== Local government reform ===
In the local government reform in the early 1970s the following cities and towns became part of the city of Bruchsal. Before the district reform they were all part of Bruchsal district.

- July 1, 1971: Obergrombach and Untergrombach
- July 1, 1972: Büchenau and Helmsheim
- October 1, 1974: Heidelsheim

== Demographics ==
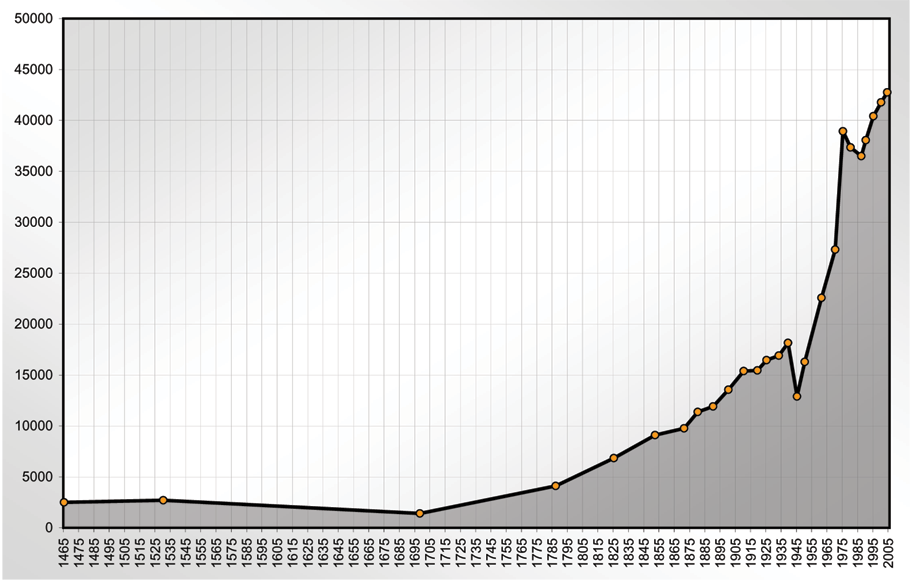
Bruchsal demographics

Figures reflect the city limits at the time and are estimates or Census data (¹), or official extensions thereof, counting only primary residences.

| Date | Population |
|---|---|
| 1465 | 2,500 |
| 1530 | 2,700 |
| 1698 | 1,400 |
| 1787 | 4,112 |
| 1825 | 6,833 |
| 1852 | 9,096 |
| December 1, 1871 | 9,762 |
| December 1, 1880 ¹ | 11,373 |
| December 1, 1890 ¹ | 11,909 |

| Date | Population |
|---|---|
| December 1, 1900 ¹ | 13,555 |
| December 1, 1910 ¹ | 15,391 |
| October 8, 1919 ¹ | 15,453 |
| June 16, 1925 ¹ | 16,469 |
| June 16, 1933 ¹ | 16,903 |
| May 17, 1939 ¹ | 18,158 |
| December, 1945 ¹ | 12,890 |
| September 13, 1950 ¹ | 16,282 |
| June 6, 1961 ¹ | 22,578 |

| Date | Population |
|---|---|
| May 27, 1970 ¹ | 27,308 |
| December 31, 1975 | 38,929 |
| December 31, 1980 | 37,351 |
| May 27, 1987 ¹ | 36,500 |
| December 31, 1990 | 38,059 |
| December 31, 1995 | 40,413 |
| December 31, 2000 | 41,777 |
| March 31, 2004 | 42,747 |

¹ Census data

== Government ==
Under the local government reform in the 1970s, borough councils were introduced in Baden-Württemberg. Residents of each borough elect their Borough Council at each municipal election. The Borough Council must be consulted on issues that significantly affect the borough. The Borough President also leads the Borough Council.

=== City council ===
Since the last municipal elections on May 25, 2014, the City Council of Bruchsal consists of 32 members (previously 35) whose official title is "Stadtrat" (male) or "Stadträtin" (female) (City Councillor). They belong to political parties as follows:

| Party | Votes 2014 | +/− | Seats 2014 | +/− | Votes 2009 | +/− | Seats 2009 | +/− |
| CDU | 36.78% | (+0.5) | 11 | (−3) | 36.2% | (−6.9) | 14 | (−4) |
| SPD | 21.81% | (+1.6) | 7 | (+/−0) | 20.2% | (+0.3) | 7 | (−1) |
| FWV | 15.22% | (−1.4) | 5 | (−1) | 16.6% | (−1.8) | 6 | (=) |
| FDP/Bürgerliste Bruchsal | 8.41% | (−3.9) | 3 | (−1) | 12.3% | (+4.0) | 4 | (+1) |
| Grüne/Neue Köpfe | 12.06% | (+0.1) | 4 | (+/−0) | 12.0% | (+1.7) | 4 | (=) |
| AfD | 2.94% | (+2.9) | 1 | (+1) | n.a. | | n.a. |
| Die Linke | 1.73% | (+1.7) | 1 | (+1) | % | () | 0 | (0) |
| Others | % | () | 0 | (+/−0) | 2.7% | (+2.7) | 0 | (=) |

=== Mayor ===
The head of the city is the Mayor, who is elected by registered voters for a term of 8 years. His permanent Deputy is the City Council President.

Mayors since 1900

- 1898–1913: Karl Stritt
- 1913–1933: Karl Meister
- 1945–1963: Franz Bläsi (CDU)
- 1964–1985: Adolf Bieringer (CDU)
- 1985–2009: Bernd Doll (CDU)
- 2009–2025: Cornelia Petzold-Schick
- 2025–present: Sven Weigt (CDU)

=== Coat of arms ===
Bruchsal's Coat of Arms features a solid, polished silver cross on blue background, with a silver ball in the top left quadrant. The official city colors are white and blue. The Coat of Arms symbolized the Cross of Speyer, referring to the fact that Bruchsal was the official residence of the Bishop until 1803, and has been in use for many centuries. There is some uncertainty as to how the ball came into the arms. The ball may have become part of the Coat of Arms by accident, in that an engraving fault may have been misinterpreted in an older print. Residents refer to it commonly as the Schandfleck (the "blot on the city's escutcheon").

== Main sights ==
=== Buildings ===
The Château of Bruchsal was built in the baroque style of the mid 18th century, starting around 1720, and served as the official residence of the bishops of Speyer. Its centre was a three-winged building that was based on the plans of Maximilian von Welsch for Cardinal Damian Hugo Philipp von Schönborn, Prince-Bishop of Speyer (1719–1743) and of Konstanz (1740). After the plans had been modified several times, the central staircase was built by Balthasar Neumann, who had taken over and filled the role of Chief Engineer since 1731. It is generally regarded as one of the most successful design solutions for a baroque staircase. The château complex includes numerous other buildings, among them Damian's Gate and the Church of the Court. In the closing days of World War II the château was badly damaged by an air raid aimed at Bruchsal, and it burned out completely. The famous staircase largely survived (though it was badly damaged), but the dome did not. After lengthy discussions about whether and how it should be done, the large central part of the building (Corps de Logis) was reconstructed (well into the 1970s) as a museum, while the Church wing design was changed to a modern design.

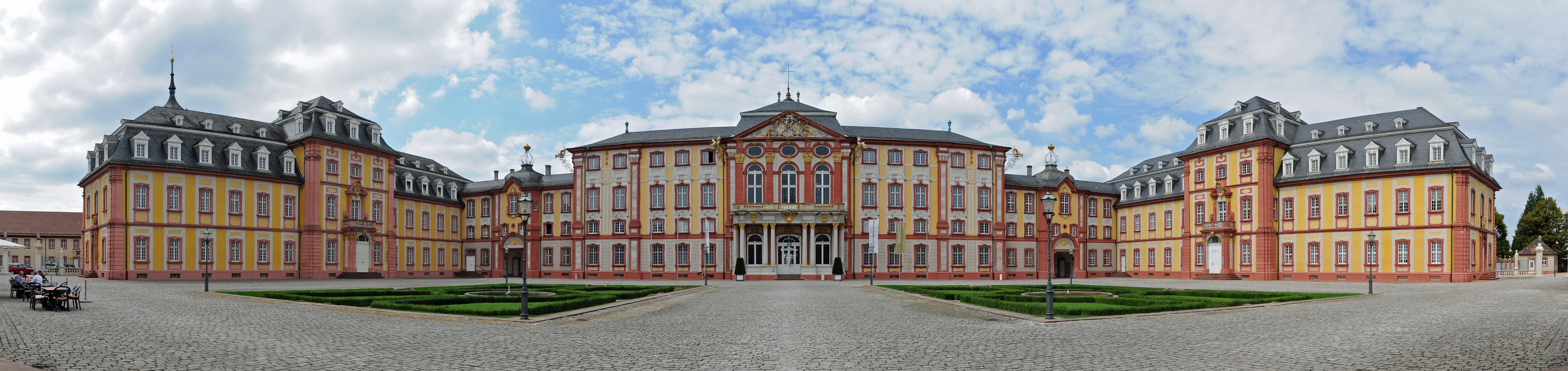
Panoramic view of the courtyard

The Belvedere was originally designed as a Lustschloss (pleasure palace), to which a shooting house was added for use in the shooting competitions often held by the Court. As time went by, the Manor was nicknamed Belvedere by the city's residents, as it enjoyed the best view of the city. The Belvedere is part of the City Gardens.

The most significant church in Bruchsal is Saint Peter's Church, where the last of the Bishops of Speyer were laid to rest. Another important churches are the City Church of Our Lady and the Martin Luther Church (the main Protestant church of the city). City Hall adjacent to the Market Place is a modern building erected in the 1950s which has since been protected by law as an important historic structure.

The prison, constructed around 1848, is nicknamed the Octagon Cafe or "Cafe Achteck". Today it is a high security institution and predominantly houses individuals convicted of violent crimes and convicted terrorists, such as members of the Red Army Faction.

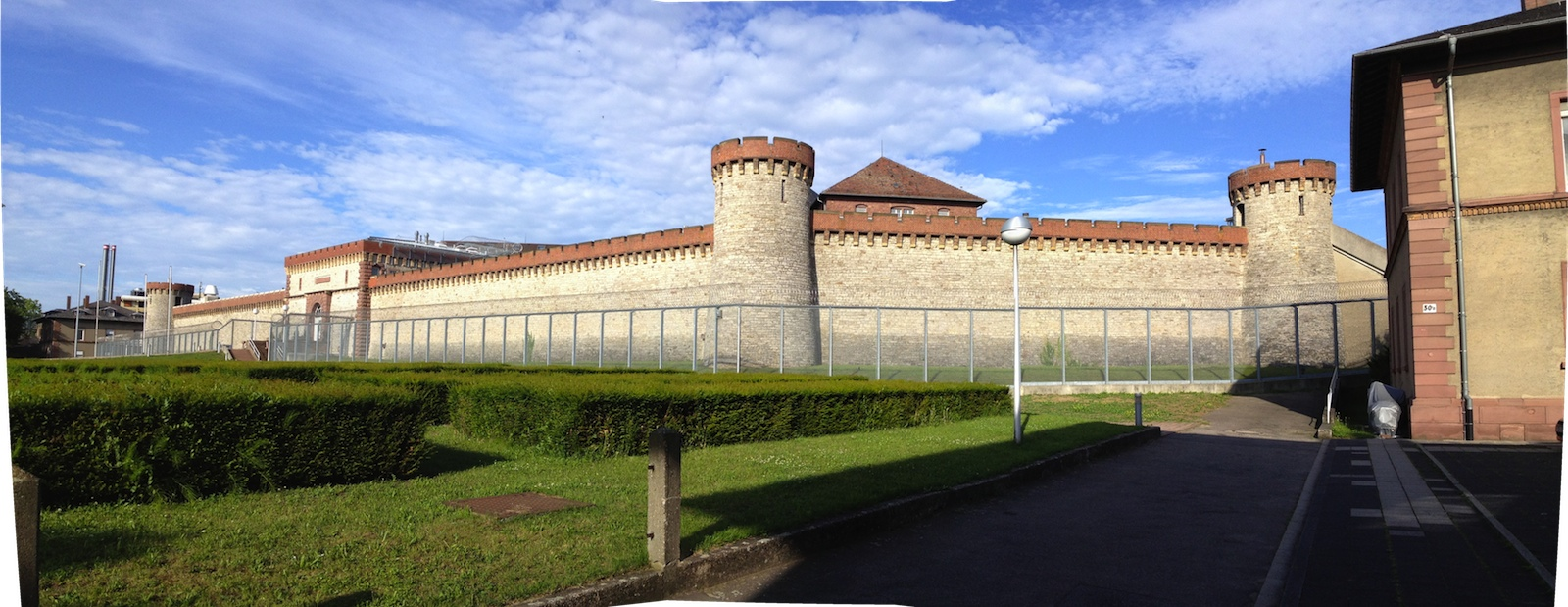
Outer west wall and main entrance panorama of Bruchsal Prison

=== Museums ===
The State Museum of Baden operates a branch in parts of the Château at Bruchsal. It features an art-historic collection and the German Music Box Museum.

Additionally, the boroughs of Heidelsheim and Untergrombach each maintain a museum of local history, and a Kindergartenmuseum displays items showing the history and development of preschools and includes games, dolls, and preschool furnishings. Inside Damian's Gate at the southern exit of the château grounds, the local art society (Kunstverein Bruchsal e. V.) exhibits contemporary art.

=== Parks ===
The City Gardens near the Belvedere were constructed in 1901. Then there is the Bürgerpark around the Community Center and, last but not least, the Château Gardens, the largest park in the city. Its upper gardens were constructed at the same time the château was built, starting around 1721, while the middle and lower gardens were never completely finished. The railway to Heidelberg cuts through the lower gardens today and reduced them to a tree-lined avenue.

== Culture ==
The Badische Landesbühne theater company calls Bruchsal home, its home theater being the stage in the Community Center (built on the grounds of the former Psycha, which is today the Bürgerpark and intended to be Bruchsal's cultural center).

Bruchsal also supports an amateur theater company called Die Koralle. Die Koralle has produced between two and four plays a year, both modern and of the classics, since approximately 1965.

Willi - die Bühne organizes independent arts events from time to time at the city slaughterhouse.

Although Bruchsal is a fairly small city it has a very active night life.

== Transport ==
Map of the S-Bahn RheinNeckar

Bruchsal is located near the Autobahn A 5 (Karlsruhe - Frankfurt) (Bruchsal Exit). In addition, the city is traversed by federal highways B 3 (Karlsruhe - Heidelberg) and B 35 (Bretten - Germersheim).

Bruchsal station, designed and built by Berthold Schweikert, is located at the intersection of the Karlsruhe–Heidelberg line, the line to Mühlacker and the line to Germersheim.

Light rail or "S-Bahn" Lines S 3 (Karlsruhe - Heidelberg - Speyer) and S 4 (Bruchsal - Heidelberg - Speyer) of the S-Bahn RheinNeckar, and the S 31 (Karlsruhe - Bruchsal - Odenheim), S 32 (Karlsruhe - Bruchsal - Menzingen) and S 9 (Bruchsal - Bretten - Knittlingen - Mühlacker) lines of the Stadtbahn Karlsruhe in the Karlsruher Verkehrsverbunds (KVV) also stop at the Bruchsal station. Furthermore, most of the boroughs have stops along these light rail lines.

Additional public transport within the city and its immediate surroundings is offered by numerous bus lines.

There is no airport in the city with the nearest airports are Karlsruhe/Baden-Baden Airport, located 65 km (40 mi) to the south west, Stuttgart Airport located 98 km (61 mi) to the south east and Frankfurt Airport, located 113 km (70 mi) to the north of Bruchsal.

== Media ==
The Badischen Neuesten Nachrichten (BNN), a daily newspaper operating out of Karlsruhe, publishes a local edition by the name of Bruchsaler Rundschau.

Willi, a monthly magazine, is published and is also available online, at no charge, in .pdf form.

Stadtinfoplattform Bruchsal-XL offers facts, reports and up-to-date information on events in the city and region.

Cable TV's Channel S14 broadcasts the Bruchsal-Magazin BM-TV with weekly programs on news from Bruchsal and the region. These broadcasts are also available via live Internet-TV through the Stadtinfoplattform Bruchsal-XL.de site. Also available are online archives.

Finally, the Bruchsaler Wochenblatt, a weekly offered free of charge, and the Kurier, an advertising weekly published by the Badischen Neuesten Nachrichten and also offered free of charge, round out the picture.

== Education ==
Bruchsal was the home of the International University in Germany, one of the first private colleges in Germany. The university occupied the former military barracks complex in the Kasernenstraße before ceasing operations at the end of 2009.

Bruchsal also offers a wide variety of liberal arts schools, among them the Justus-Knecht-Gymnasium, the Schönborn-Gymnasium (both public college-track high schools), the St. Paulusheim gymnasium, a private college-track high school that started out as a boys-only boarding school, and the Albert-Schweitzer-Realschule, a non-college track public high school (all in the core of Bruchsal).

The school system also operates the following grammar and middle schools: Burg School in the borough of Obergrombach, Dietrich-Bonhoeffer-School, Johann-Peter-Hebel-School (near the Château Gardens), Joss-Fritz-School in Untergrombach, Konrad-Adenauer-School in the southern core of the city and Stirum School in the centrum, as well as an independent grammar school each in the boroughs of Büchenau and Helmsheim.

Specialized schools are offered as well: Pestalozzi School for the learning disabled and, administered by the district of Karlsruhe, Karl-Berberich-School for the mentally disabled. The district also runs the four vocational schools located in Bruchsal. They are the Balthasar-Neumann-School I, Balthasar-Neumann-School II (teaching artisan, mechanics and other hands-on occupations), the merchant and bookkeeping school (teaching administrative and merchant professions) and Käthe-Kollwitz-School (teaching professions in the field of home economics).

The Abendrealschule Bruchsal allows students with middle school diplomas to achieve the first in a series of steps to gain college entrance prerequisites on a part-time basis after work. It is part of a structured program commonly referred to as the Alternate Path to Higher Education. Furthermore, three private schools, the nursing school attached to the Fürst-Stirum-Klinik Bruchsal and the College for Special Education of St. Maria complete Bruchsal's educational offers.

== Research ==
The research project for urban and autonomous freight logistics, efeuCampus, was launched in July 2019 on the site of the former Dragonerkaserne barracks. Systems for autonomous freight delivery and collection are developed and tested on the campus. The overall project is funded by the European Union and the state of Baden-Württemberg.

== Notable people ==
- 1470 (approx.) in Untergrombach, Joß Fritz, farmer, leader during the peasant revolts, died after 1524
- 1500 Johannes Stumpf, theologian, topographer, historian and chronicler; died 1575 in Zürich
- 1534 Samuel Eisenmenger physician, theologian and astrologer, died 1585
- 1824 Katrina Wolf Murat, maker of the first U.S. flag in Colorado
- 1857 in Heidelsheim, Isaac Baer, from 1897 Julius Baer, private banker, died 9. March 1922 in Riehen, Switzerland
- 1861 Karl Steiner, died 1929 in Baden-Baden, born in Heidelsheim, official
- 1875 Otto Oppenheimer, textile trader, dialect and homeland poet, died 1951 in New York, USA
- 1879 Wilhelm Henning, died after 1943, military and ethnic-nationalistic politician
- 1883 Walter Buch, jurist and judge of the NSDAP-court, died 1949 in Schondorf am Ammersee
- 1894 Leo Kahn, artist, died 1983 in Safed, Israel
- 1896 Wilhelm Sauter, painter (paintings and drawings), died 1948 in Göppingen
- 1898 Fritz Klein, German resistance fighter against national socialism, was executed in the penal prison of the Seilerbahn in 1944
- 1909 Josef Hirtreiter, SS Holocaust perpetrator who worked at Treblinka extermination camp
- 1937 Emma Guntz, German-French author and journalist
- 1938 Franz Alt, journalist and author
- 1963 Klaus Bachmann, journalist, author, historian
- 1968 John Zimmermann, military historian and lieutenant
- 1971 Thomas Hellriegel, triathlete (long distance)
- 1974 Anke Huber, tennis player
- 1984 Florian Dick, footballer
- 1993 Marvin Wanitzek, footballer
- 1994 Petar Mišić, footballer
- 1995 Jimmy Marton, footballer

== International relations ==
Bruchsal is sister city to the following cities:

- Sainte-Menehould, France, since 1965
- Cwmbran, Wales, United Kingdom, since 1979
- Sainte-Marie-aux-Mines, France, since 1989
- Gornja Radgona, Slovenia, since 2006
- Volterra, Italy, since 2008
