= Kronau =

Kronau may refer to:

- Kronau (Baden), a municipality in Germany
- Kronau, Saskatchewan, a hamlet in Canada
- Kronau Colony, present-day Vysokopillia, Ukraine
