= Saalbach (Rhine) =

River in Germany

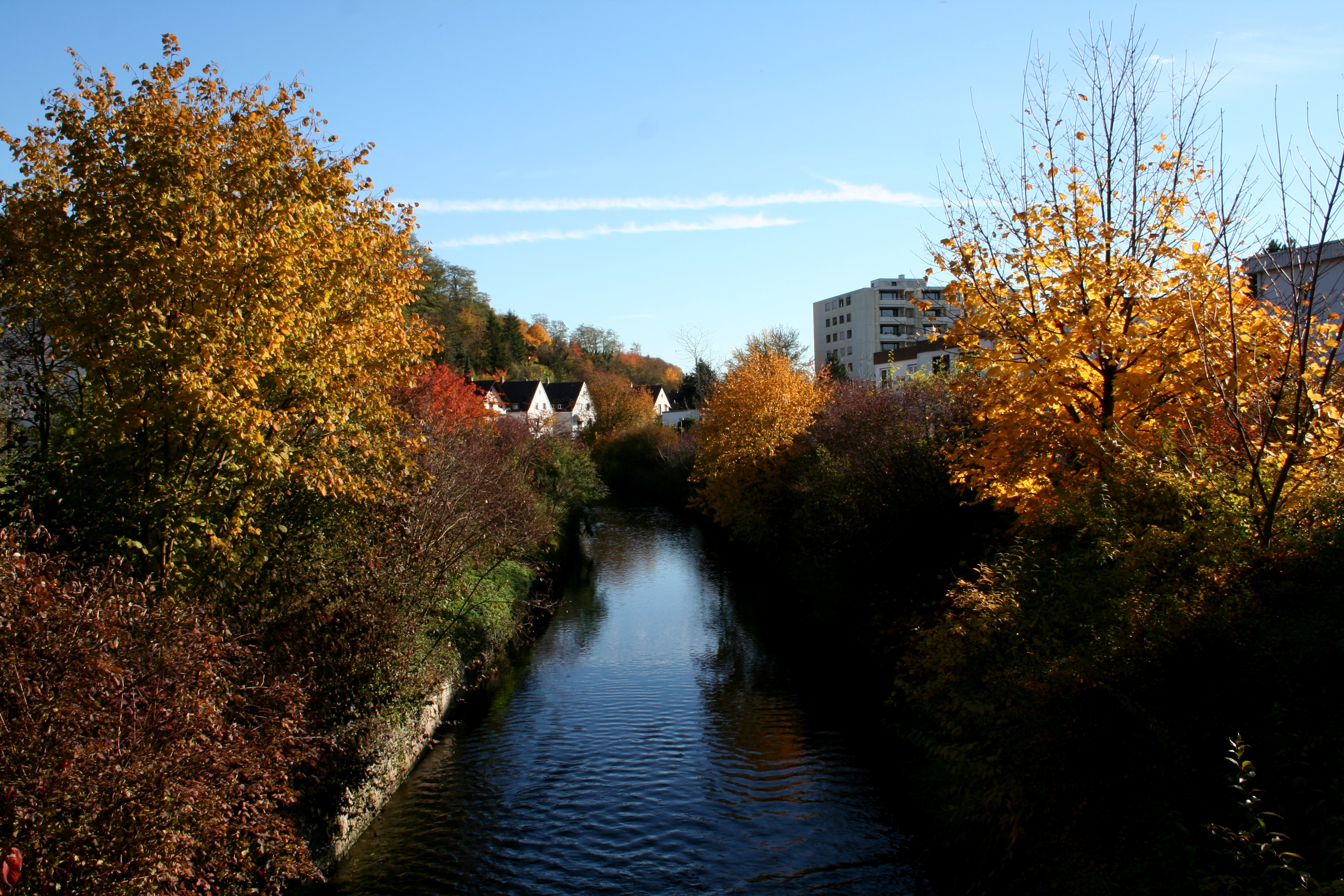
- The Saalbach in the town of Bruchsal

Location
- Country: Germany
- State: Baden-Württemberg

Physical characteristics
- Source
  - coordinates: 49°2′4″N 8°42′31″E
  - elevation: 165 m (541 ft)
- Mouth
  - coordinates: 49°16′17″N 8°27′5″E
  - elevation: 95 m (312 ft)
- Length: 50.7 km (31.5 mi)
- Basin size: 265 km^{2} (102 sq mi)

Basin features
- Progression: Rhine→ North Sea

The Saalbach is a 51-kilometre-long (32 mi) (including its source river Weißach) right tributary of the Rhine running through the German state of Baden-Württemberg. The river source is in the Kraichgau region near the city of Bretten, formed by the confluence of the rivers Weißach and Salzach. It then flows through Gondelsheim to the northwest, then through Bruchsal and Karlsdorf. It then turns north through Philippsburg before emptying into the Rhine.

== See also ==
- List of rivers of Baden-Württemberg
