= Louie Croft Boyd =

American nurse and hospital superintendent

Louie Croft Boyd R.N.
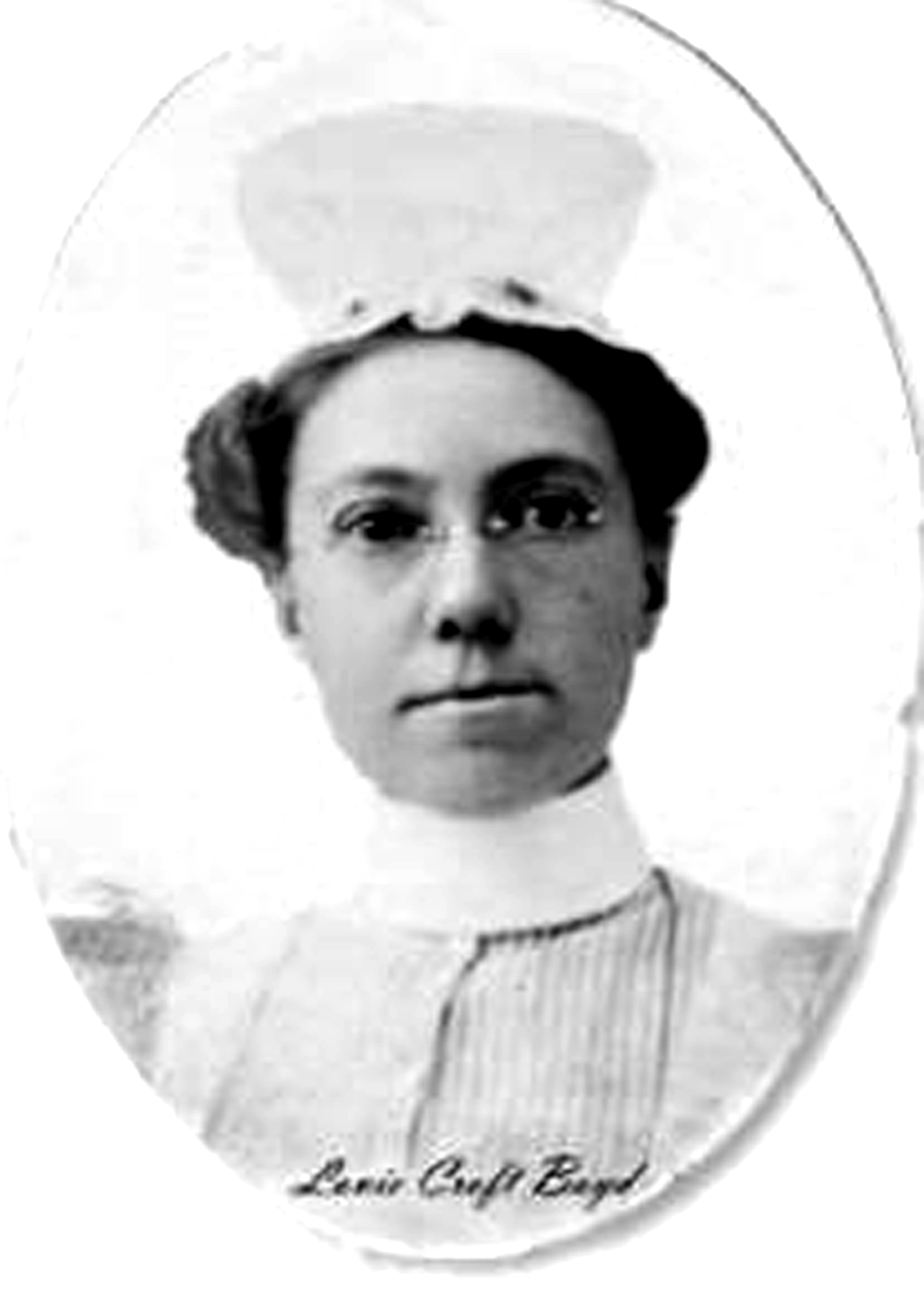
- Official Colorado Women's Hall of Fame Portrait
- Born: 1871; New York, US
- Died: June 15, 1951 (aged 79–80); Denver, Colorado, US
- Education: B.A., Colorado Training School for Nurses, 1899; Certificate of Hospital Economics, Teachers College, Columbia University, 1909
- Occupations: Hospital superintendent of nurses Nursing instructor
- Years active: 1900–1941
- Known for: First licensed nurse in state of Colorado (1905)
- Medical career
- Institutions: Denver General Hospital; Rio Grande Hospital, Salida, Colorado; St. Luke's Hospital, Denver; Wyoming General Hospital, Rock Springs, Wyoming; Minnesota State Sanatorium for Consumptives
- Awards: Colorado Nurses Association Hall of Fame, 2004; Colorado Women's Hall of Fame, 2004

Louie Croft Boyd (1871 – June 15, 1951) was an American nurse, hospital superintendent of nurses, nursing instructor, and writer. As a lobbyist for the newly formed Colorado State Trained Nurses Association, she advocated for legislation to regulate the licensing of nurses in Colorado. Upon passage of the bill in 1905, she applied for and became the first licensed nurse in the state. She was posthumously inducted into the Colorado Nurses Association Hall of Fame and the Colorado Women's Hall of Fame in 2004.

== Early life and education ==
Louie Croft Boyd was born in New York in 1871. As a teenager, Boyd was active in the cause of women's suffrage and wrote for a newspaper. In 1892 she relocated to Colorado for health reasons, and during her convalescence became interested in nursing. She enrolled at the newly opened Colorado Training School for Nurses at Denver General Hospital, where she earned her B.A. in 1899.

She did postgraduate work at Chicago Presbyterian Hospital in 1904, and became a registered nurse in Colorado in 1905 and in Minnesota in 1909. In 1909 she earned a Certificate of Hospital Economics at Teachers College, Columbia University. She was also an alumnus of the University of Colorado Denver, the University of Denver, and the University of New Mexico.

== Career ==
Boyd was appointed Superintendent of Nurses at Denver General Hospital and Rio Grande Hospital in Salida in 1900. She worked in the same capacity at St. Luke's Hospital in Denver; Wyoming General Hospital in Rock Springs, Wyoming; and the Minnesota State Sanatorium for Consumptives.

In 1910 she began training nurses at Park Avenue Hospital, City and County Hospital, and Children's Hospital of Denver. During World War I, she was a Red Cross Instructor and Examiner in Elementary Hygiene and Home Care of the Sick, and was involved in the formation of a military base hospital in Denver. She later taught at the University of Colorado and the University of New Mexico.

== Memberships ==
In 1904 Boyd participated in the establishment of the Colorado State Trained Nurses Association (today the Colorado Nurses Association). She served that organization as secretary from 1904 to 1906. She was also the group's first lobbyist, in which capacity she advocated for legislation to regulate the licensing of nurses. When the bill was passed into law in 1905, creating the State Board of Nursing Examiners, Boyd applied for her own license, becoming the first licensed nurse in the state on July 26, 1905. Boyd's 1911 work State Registration for Nurses (updated in 1915) summarizes the laws applying to nurse registration throughout the United States and notes the differences in regulatory rules among states.

Boyd served as the first secretary of the State Board of Nursing Examiners from 1905 to 1907, and later served as its president. She was also a member of the National League for Nursing Education.

== Final years ==
Boyd became blind due to glaucoma, forcing her retirement in 1941. She died on June 15, 1951, at Denver General Hospital. In her will, she donated her body to the University of Colorado School of Medicine for the study of glaucoma.

== Honors ==
In 2004 Boyd was posthumously inducted into both the Colorado Nurses Association Hall of Fame and the Colorado Women's Hall of Fame.

== Selected bibliography ==
- Palmer Lake and environments: The wonderland of the West, a realm of grandeur and beauty, an unrivalled health and pleasure resort, a rich agricultural and grazing country, a promising mining camp, a country of many diversified resources, a land which offers homes, health and happiness to rich and poor. Palmer Lake, Colorado. 1895. OCLC 83451367. (with W. Finley Thompson)
- Boyd, Louie Croft (January 1907). "The Tuberculosis Situation in Denver, Colorado". American Journal of Nursing. 7 (4): 265–268. doi:10.2307/3403351. JSTOR 3403351.
- State Registration for Nurses. W. B. Saunders Co. 1911. (2nd edition pub. 1915)
- "The University and the Education of the Nurse". Bulletin of the University of Mexico. 1 (10): 388–411. September 1916.
- Colorado Training School for Nurses 1887–1924. 1924. OCLC 52102187.
- Boyd, Louie Croft (1924). History of the Denver General Hospital, Denver, Colorado, 1860–1924.
- Boyd, Louie Croft (August 1928). "Tramping with a Camera". American Journal of Nursing. 28 (8): 793–797. doi:10.2307/3408476. JSTOR 3408476.
- Katrina Wolf Murat, the Pioneer. State Historical Society of Colorado. 1939.
