= Weißach (Saalbach) =

River in Germany

Location
- Country: Germany
- State: Baden-Württemberg

Physical characteristics
- Mouth
  - location: Saalbach
  - coordinates: 49.0344°N 8.7087°E

Basin features
- Progression: Saalbach→ Rhine→ North Sea

Weißach is a river of Baden-Württemberg, Germany. It is the right headstream of the Saalbach.

== See also ==
- List of rivers of Baden-Württemberg
