= La Bouëxière =

La Bouëxière Beuzid-ar-C’hoadoù (Breton)
- Commune
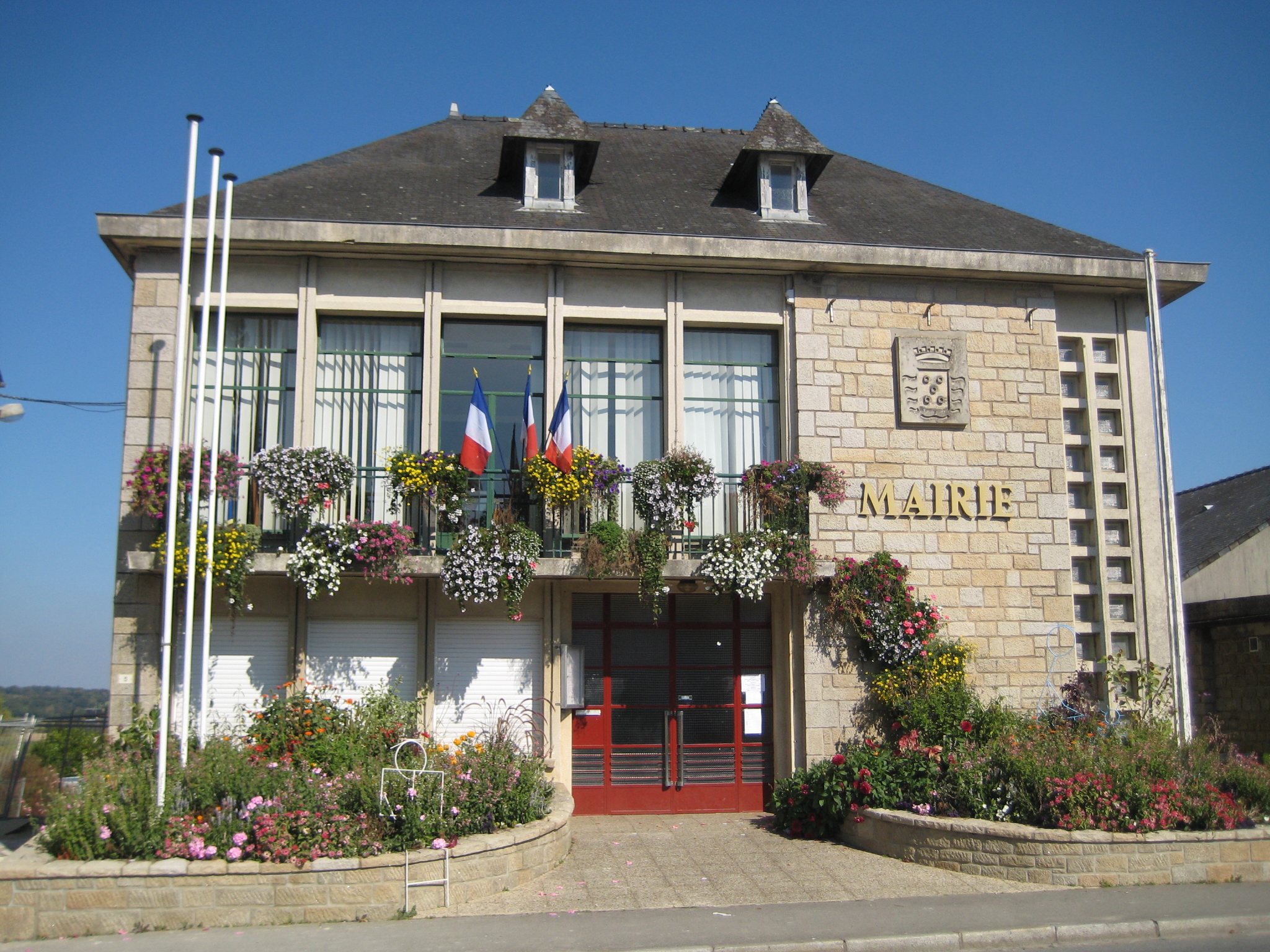
- The town hall of La Bouëxière

- Coat of arms
- Location of La Bouëxière
- Location within France Location within Brittany
- Coordinates: 48°11′05″N 1°26′12″W
- Country: France
- Region: Brittany
- Department: Ille-et-Vilaine
- Arrondissement: Rennes
- Canton: Liffré

Government
  - Mayor (2020–2026): Stéphane Piquet
- Area^{1}: 49.68 km^{2} (19.18 sq mi)
- Highest elevation: 125 m (410 ft)
- Lowest elevation: 42 m (138 ft)
- Population (2023): 4,667
  - Density: 93.94/km^{2} (243.3/sq mi)
- Time zone: UTC+01:00 (CET)
  - Summer (DST): UTC+02:00 (CEST)
- INSEE/Postal code: 35031 /35340
- ^{1} French Land Register data, which excludes lakes, ponds, glaciers > 1 km^{2} (0.386 sq mi or 247 acres) and river estuaries.

La Bouëxière (French pronunciation: [la bwɛksjɛʁ] or [la bwɛsjɛʁ]; Breton: Beuzid-ar-C'hoadoù) is a commune in the Ille-et-Vilaine department in Brittany in northwestern France.

It is situated 19 km (12 mi) from Rennes in the forest of Rennes.

Its mayor is Stéphane Piquet, who was re-elected in 2020.

== Population ==
Inhabitants of La Bouëxière are called Bouexièrais in French.

Historical population
Year	Pop.	±% p.a.
1968	1,965	—
1975	2,142	+1.24%
1982	2,667	+3.18%
1990	3,027	+1.60%
1999	3,503	+1.64%
2007	3,875	+1.27%
2012	3,983	+0.55%
2017	4,447	+2.23%
2023	4,667	+0.81%
Source: INSEE

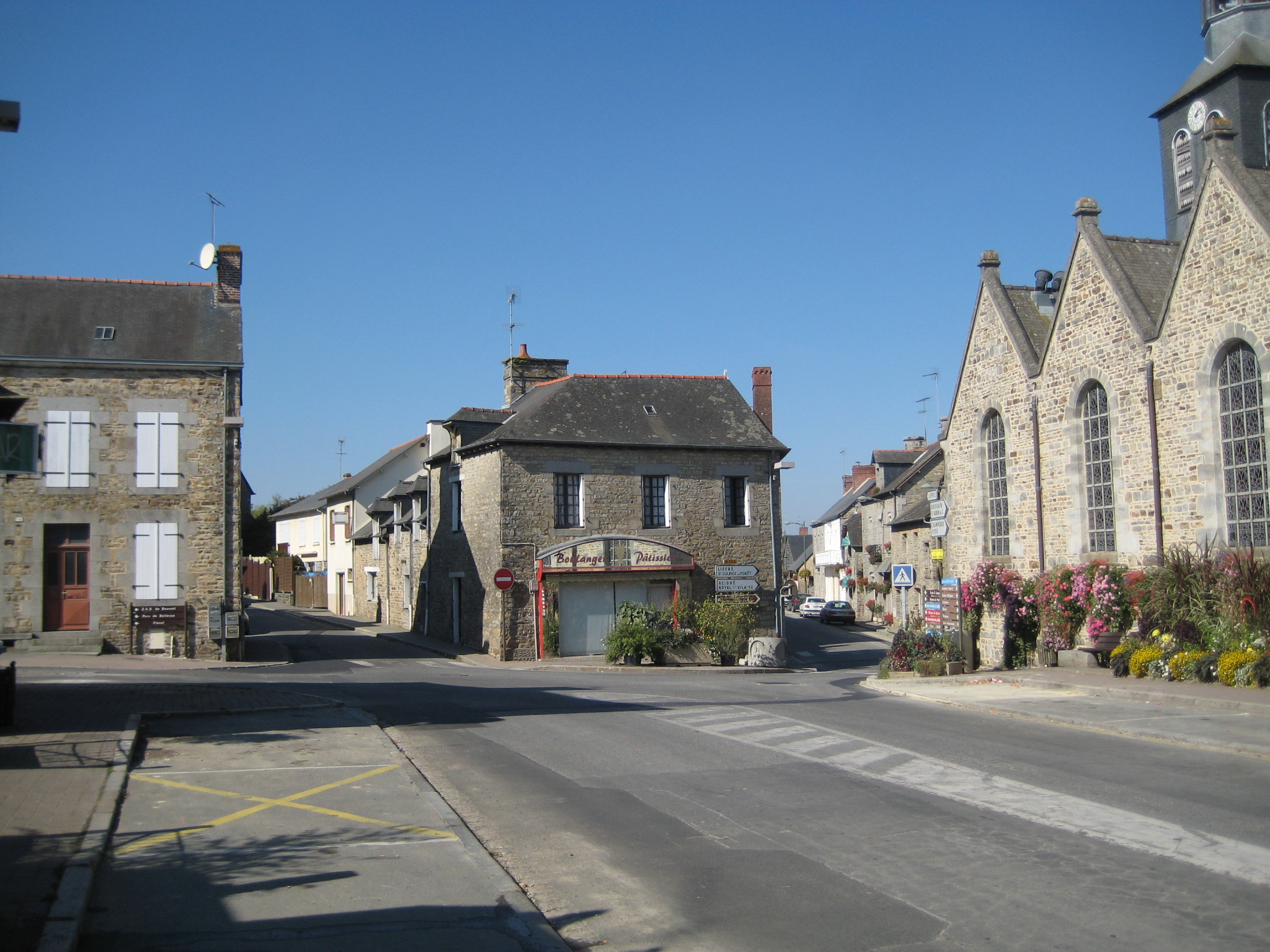
The main road

== International relations ==
La Bouëxière is twinned with Wingrave in England and Hambrücken in Germany.

== See also ==
- Communes of the Ille-et-Vilaine department
