= Bruchsal (district) =

Coordinates: 49°08′N 8°36′E

- District
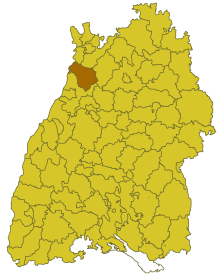
- Country: Germany
- State: Baden-Württemberg
- Adm. region: North Baden
- Disbanded: 1973-01-01
- Capital: Bruchsal

Area
  - Total: 455.96 km^{2} (176.05 sq mi)

Population (27 May 1970)
  - Total: 140,095
  - Density: 310/km^{2} (800/sq mi)
- Time zone: UTC+01:00 (CET)
  - Summer (DST): UTC+02:00 (CEST)
- Vehicle registration: BR

Bruchsal was a district (Kreis) in the administrative region of Nordbaden in Baden-Württemberg, Germany. The district consisted of 5 cities and 33 towns. The town of Bruchsal was the seat of the district and the license plate code was BR. Bruchsal district was dissolved as a result of the district reform effective 1 January 1973, when it was merged into the district of Karlsruhe.

Coat of arms of Bruchsal district
