= Klaus Bachmann =

German writer, historian and political scientist living in Poland

- Born: 12 December 1963 (age 62); Bruchsal, West Germany
- Citizenship: Poland

Academic background
- Education: University of Heidelberg, University of Vienna and University of Kraków, University of Warsaw (PhD)
- Thesis: Die Ruthenische Irredenta. Die ukrainische national Bewegung und die Aussenpolitik Der Donaumonarchie 1907–1914 (2000)
- Doctoral advisor: Włodzimierz Borodziej

Academic work
- Discipline: History
- Sub-discipline: German-Polish relations
- Institutions: SWPS University

Klaus Dieter Bachmann (born 12 December 1963) is a German journalist, writer, historian and political scientist. He is an author of books and writings on German, Austrian and Polish culture, history and politics, as well as on the European Union and German-Polish as well as Polish-Ukrainian relations. In 1988, Bachmann settled in Poland and began to write on a regular basis for various Austrian and German newspapers and weeklies (Die Presse, Falter, Die Tageszeitung), reporting on the revolutionary and evolutionary political, economic, social and cultural changes in the post-Soviet bloc countries. Since 1989, he worked as the accredited foreign correspondent based in Poland, and also from 1992, in Kyiv, Minsk and Vilnius. During the mid-1990s he wrote for a Berlin daily, Der Tagesspiegel, for Die Stuttgarter Zeitung, Die Hannoversche Allgemeine Zeitung, and also for Polish mainstream newspapers and weeklies (Rzeczpospolita, Polityka, and Tygodnik Powszechny).

== Biography ==
Klaus Dieter Bachmann was born on 12 December 1963 in Bruchsal. He studied history, political science and Slavic languages (Russian, Ukrainian, and Serbo-Croatian) at the universities in Heidelberg, Vienna and Kraków. During his studies he also served as a town councillor in his hometown. In 2000, Bachmann defended his doctoral thesis on a period of political regional instability in Austro-Hungarian Galicia between 1907 and 1914, and completed his PhD degree at the University of Warsaw. The work was published in Austria and Germany as Ein Herd der Feindschaft gegen Russland Galizien als Krisenherd in den Beziehungen der Donaumonarchie mit Russland (1907–1914). Dissertation. ("A Hotbed of Hostility towards Russia. Galicia as a Flashpoint in Relations between Austria-Hungary and Russia (1907–1914). PhD").

In 2001, Bachmann moved to Brussels where he worked for three years as a correspondent for German and Austrian newspapers in the Benelux countries. In 2004, he returned to Poland and wrote a postdoctoral thesis: The Convention on the Future of Europe. Deliberative Democracy as a Method of Legitimizing Authority in a Multilevel Political System, which earned him a Doctorus Habilitatus degree at the Faculty of Social Sciences, University of Wroclaw. Subsequently, he was appointed Chair of Political Science at the Willy Brandt Center for German and European Studies at the University of Wroclaw. Between 2000 and 2001, and again since 2005, he was a member of the Governing Board of the Stefan Batory Foundation based in Warsaw.

In 2006, Bachmann became associate professor at the Institute of Political Science at the School of Social Psychology in Warsaw. He also lectures at the Institute for International Studies at the University of Wroclaw. His articles have been published in Polish mainstream weeklies (Polityka) and dailies (Gazeta Wyborcza), and also in diverse Austrian, German and Swiss newspapers. In 2004, he delivered lectures as a visiting professor at the Institute of East European History, University of Vienna (on recent history of Poland) and the Institute of Political Studies (IEP) at the University of Bordeaux (2008). He pursued scholarly research at the People's University of China (Renmin) in Beijing in 2007 and at the American Institute for Contemporary German Studies at Johns Hopkins University in Washington, in 2007. He also conducted research at the Faculty of Law at Stellenbosch University (South Africa, 2009). He is a member of the Central European International Studies Association (CEISA), the European Studies Association (EUSA), and a Fellow and Associate of the Center for International Relations based in Warsaw. He is also the Principal Officer of the Foundation for European Studies (FEPS). In December 2014, he was awarded a full tenured professorship by Polish President Bronisław Komorowski.

Just as E. M. Forster attempted to improve the troubled relationship between Germany and England (Howards End (1910), "Only connect"), and that between England and India (A Passage to India (1924)), Bachmann is working arduously to build links between erstwhile redoubtable enemies. Once branded as a "Polonized German", he has adopted the role as the leading exponent of the "thaw" in German-Polish relations, working hard to challenge and dispel the negative national stereotypes perpetuated throughout centuries. During recent years, he shifted the focus of his research to Africa, especially to South Africa, Namibia, German colonialism and Rwandan history.

He lives in Wrocław (Poland) and teaches at the University of Social Sciences and Humanities, Warsaw.

== Selected publications ==
- A History of Rwanda: From the Monarchy to Post-genocidal Justice. Milton Park, Abingdon & New York City: Routledge. 2023. ISBN 978-1-000-89290-1 – via Google Books.
- Unter dem Maulbeerbaum. Roman. Neisse und Atut Verlag: Dresden 2021.
- Genocidal Empires. German Colonialism in Africa and the Third Reich. Peter Lang Int.: Berlin 2018.
- with Klaus Bachmann, Thomas Sparrow-Botero, and Peter Lambertz: When Justice Meets Politics. Independence and Autonomy of Ad Hoc International Criminal Tribunals. Peter Lang International: New York, Oxford, Frankfurt, Zürich 2013.
- Ein Herd der Feindschaft gegen Russland. Galizien als Krisenherd in den Beziehungen der Donaumonarchie mit Russland (1907–1914). Diss. 2001. Oldenbourg Verlag. ISBN 3-486-56538-9, 292 pp.
- Polens Uhren gehen anders 2001. Hohenheim Verlag, ISBN 978-3-89850-030-2, 280pp.
- Konwent o przyszłosci Europy: demokracja deliberatywna jako metoda legitymizacji wladzy w wieloplaszczyznowym systemie politycznym Orbis Linguarum No. 28, 2004. Wroclaw: Atut, ISBN 83-89247-72-0, 267pp.
- Dlugi cien Rzeszy 2005. Wroclaw: Atut, ISBN 83-7432-063-X, 176 pp.
- with Buras Piotr and Plociennik Sebastian: Republika bez gorsetu 2005, Wroclaw: Atut, Catalogue No. 71551, 162pp.
- with Michael Fleischer, Leon Olszewski Leon et al. Rocznik Centrum Studiow Niemieckich i Europejskich im. Willy Brandta Uniwersytetu Wroclawskiego 2005, Wroclaw: University of Wroclaw Publishing House, ISBN 978-83-229-2722-9.
- Polska kaczka w europejskim stawie. Polskie szanse i wyzwania po przystapieniu do UE2006, Warsaw: WAIP, ISBN 978-83-60501-64-1, 246pp
- with Piotr Buras: Niemcy jako panstwo cywilne. Studia nad niemiecka polityka zagraniczna 2006. Wroclaw: Atut, Catalogue No. 76645, 164pp.
- Repression, Protest, Toleranz. Wertewandel und Vergangenheitsbewältigung in Polen nach 1956 2010. Wroclaw: Atut, ISBN 978-3-86276-004-6, 364 pp.
- Vergeltung, Strafe, Amnestie. Eine vergleichende Studie zu Kollaboration und ihrer Aufarbeitung in Belgien, den Niederlanden und Polen. Peter Lang Verlag, Frankfurt, Vienna, Oxford, New York 2011
- Other selected writings and articles by this author: Die Vertreibung der deutschen Bevölkerung aus den Gebieten des heutigen Polen im Spiegel der Geschichtsschreibung und der öffentlichen Meinung, TRANSODRA 12/13, September 1996, S. 48 – 63; Poland and Austria; The Cunning of Reason; Polish Populists; Europe on the Move: the Impact of Eastern Enlargement on the European Union.

For Bachmann's selected articles in Polish newspapers go to: Polska The Times ("Regional Autonomy May Arrest the Development"), Gazeta Wyborcza ("Klaus Bachmann Archives"), ("Bachmann's Election Slogan: Hurrah for the Lithuanian Wroclaw!"), ("It Would Not Be Suitable for Wroclaw to Enter into a Union with Klaipėda, ("Land for the Germans, Employment for the Poles"), ("The Duisburg Love Parade: Looking for a Scapegoat"), Super Express ("[The German] Expellees Are Bound to Fade into Insignificance"), ("He Who Likes Poland Does Not Like Erika Steinbach"), and Polityka (Klaus Bachmann Archives).
