= Salzach (Saalbach) =

River in Germany

Location
- Country: Germany
- State: Baden-Württemberg

Physical characteristics
- Mouth
  - location: Saalbach
  - coordinates: 49.0344°N 8.7087°E
- Length: 15.2 km (9.4 mi)

Basin features
- Progression: Saalbach→ Rhine→ North Sea

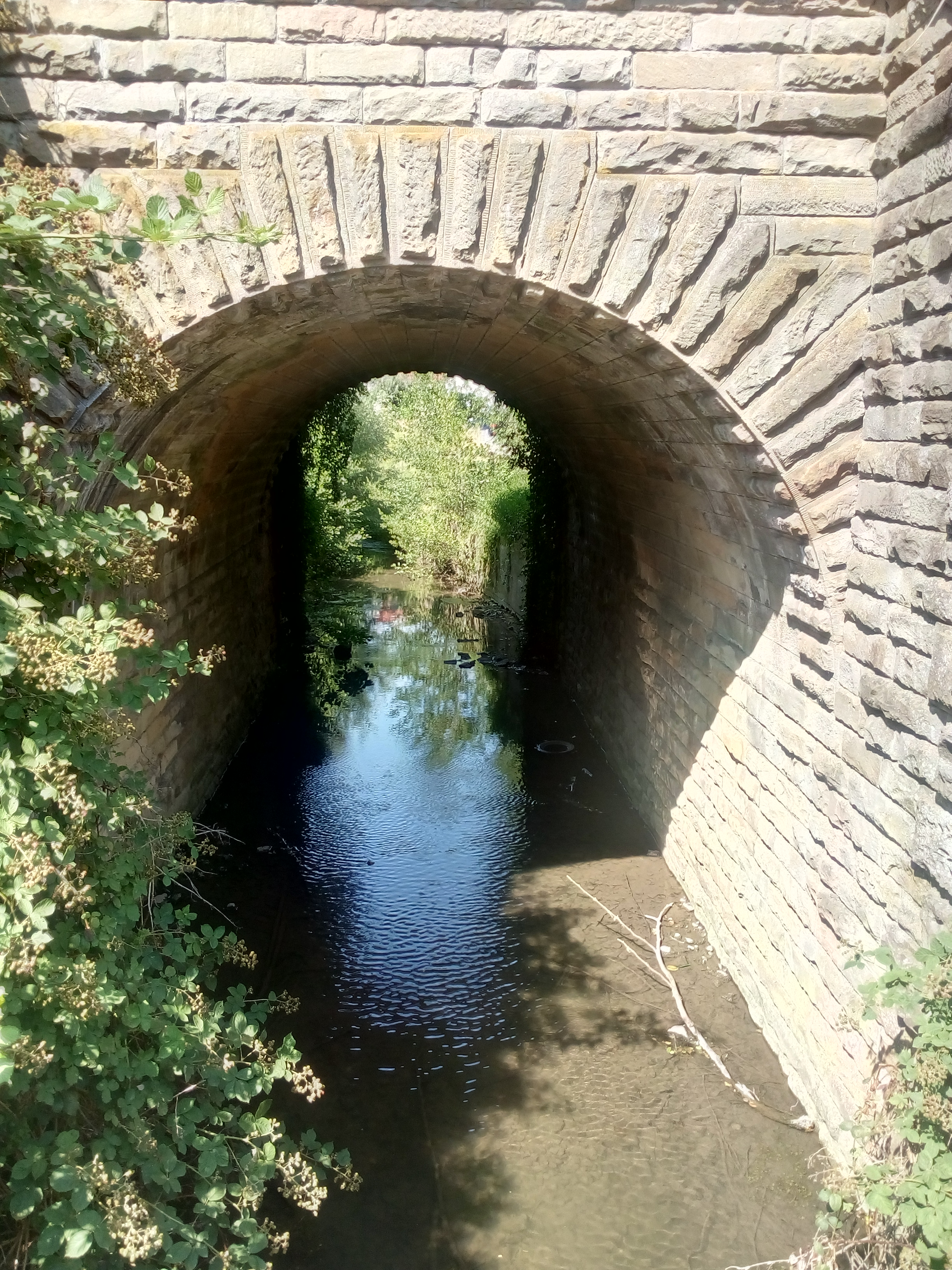
The Salzach river in Bretten, Baden-Wüttemberg

Salzach (German: [ˈzaltsax]) is a river of Baden-Württemberg, Germany. It is the left headstream of the Saalbach.

== See also ==
- List of rivers of Baden-Württemberg
