= Jimmy Marton =

German footballer

Personal information
- Date of birth: 26 August 1995 (age 31)
- Place of birth: Bruchsal, Germany
- Height: 1.77 m (5 ft 10 in)
- Position: Centre-forward

Team information
- Current team: FC Nöttingen
- Number: 9

Youth career
- –2003: FV Hambrücken
- 2003–2014: Karlsruher SC

Senior career*
Years	Team	Apps	(Gls)
2013–2015	Karlsruher SC	0	(0)
2014–2015	→ SpVgg Unterhaching (loan)	2	(0)
2014–2015	→ SpVgg Unterhaching II (loan)	11	(3)
2015–2017	1860 Munich II	51	(4)
2017–2019	FC Nöttingen	33	(1)
2017–2019	FC Nöttingen II	8	(9)
2018	→ SV Spielberg (loan)	15	(6)
2019–2021	Astoria Walldorf	42	(1)
2021–	FC Nöttingen	52	(20)

International career
2011	Germany U16	2	(1)
2011	Germany U17	4	(0)
- * Club domestic league appearances and goals as of 18 November 2022

Jimmy Marton (born 26 August 1995) is a German footballer who plays as a centre-forward for FC Nöttingen.

== Career ==
Marton made his professional debut for SpVgg Unterhaching in the 3. Liga on 25 October 2014, coming on as a substitute in the 70th minute for Lucas Hufnagel in the 0–1 home loss against VfB Stuttgart II.
