= Walzbachtal =

- Municipality
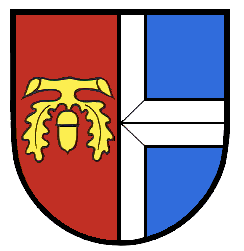
- Coat of arms

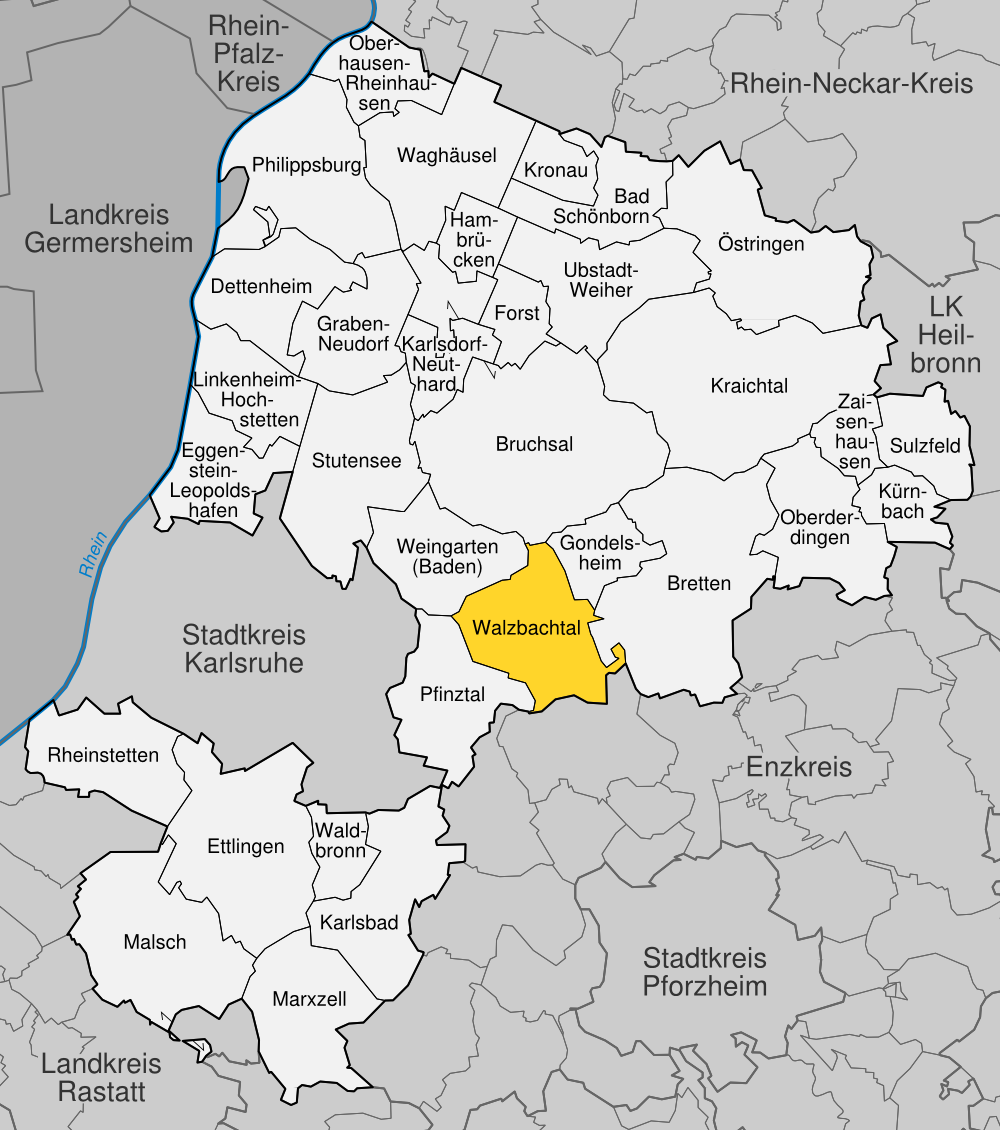
- Location of Walzbachtal within Karlsruhe district
- Interactive map of Walzbachtal
- Location within Germany Location within Baden-Württemberg
- Coordinates: 49°0′42″N 8°36′27″E
- Country: Germany
- State: Baden-Württemberg
- Admin. region: Karlsruhe
- District: Karlsruhe

Government
  - Mayor (2019–27): Timur Özcan (SPD)

Area
  - Total: 36.72 km^{2} (14.18 sq mi)
- Elevation: 193 m (633 ft)

Population (2025-12-31)
  - Total: 9,940
  - Density: 271/km^{2} (701/sq mi)
- Time zone: UTC+01:00 (CET)
  - Summer (DST): UTC+02:00 (CEST)
- Postal codes: 75045
- Dialling codes: 07203
- Vehicle registration: KA
- Website: www.walzbachtal.de

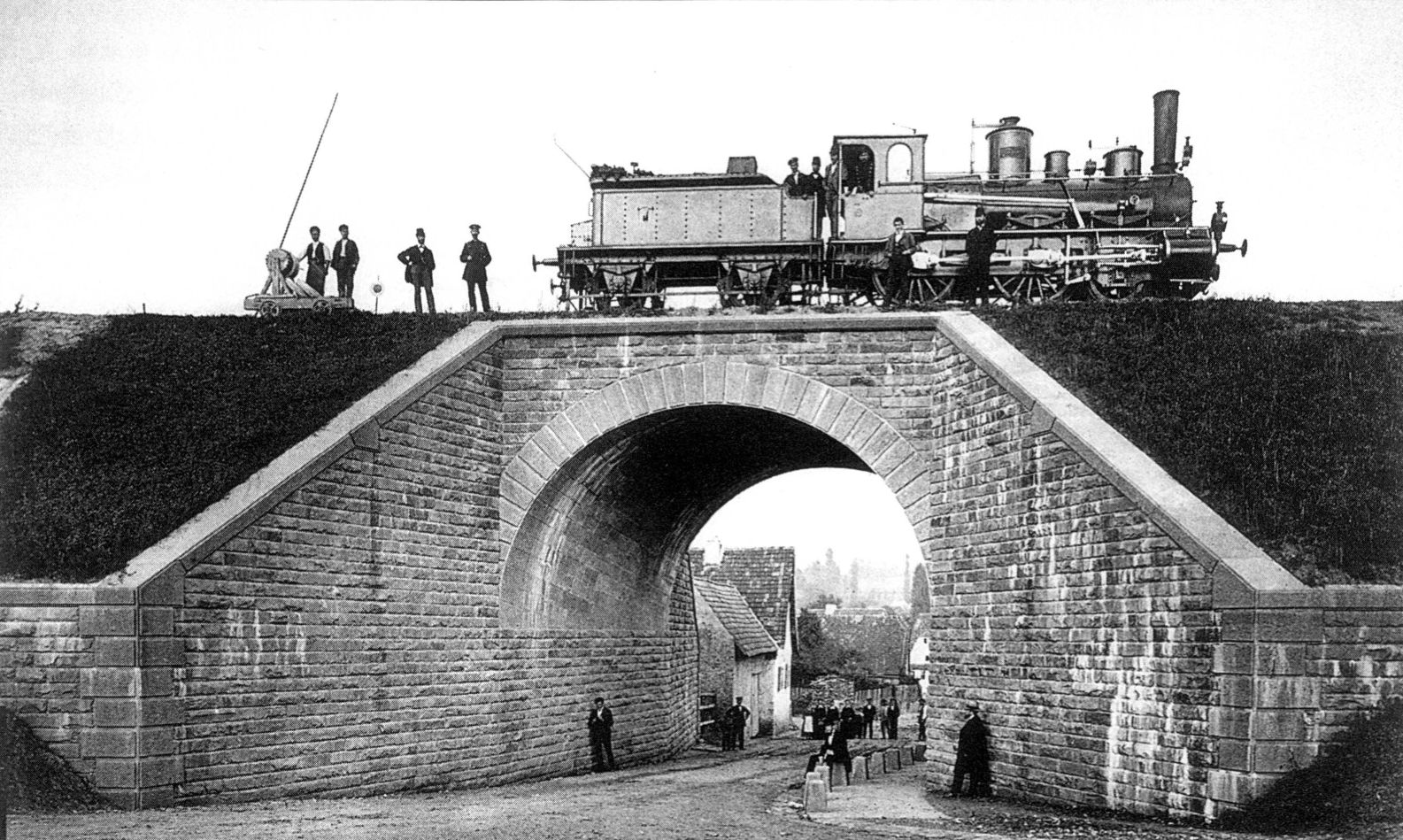
Crossing of Kraichgaubahn and road in Jöhlingen, 1879

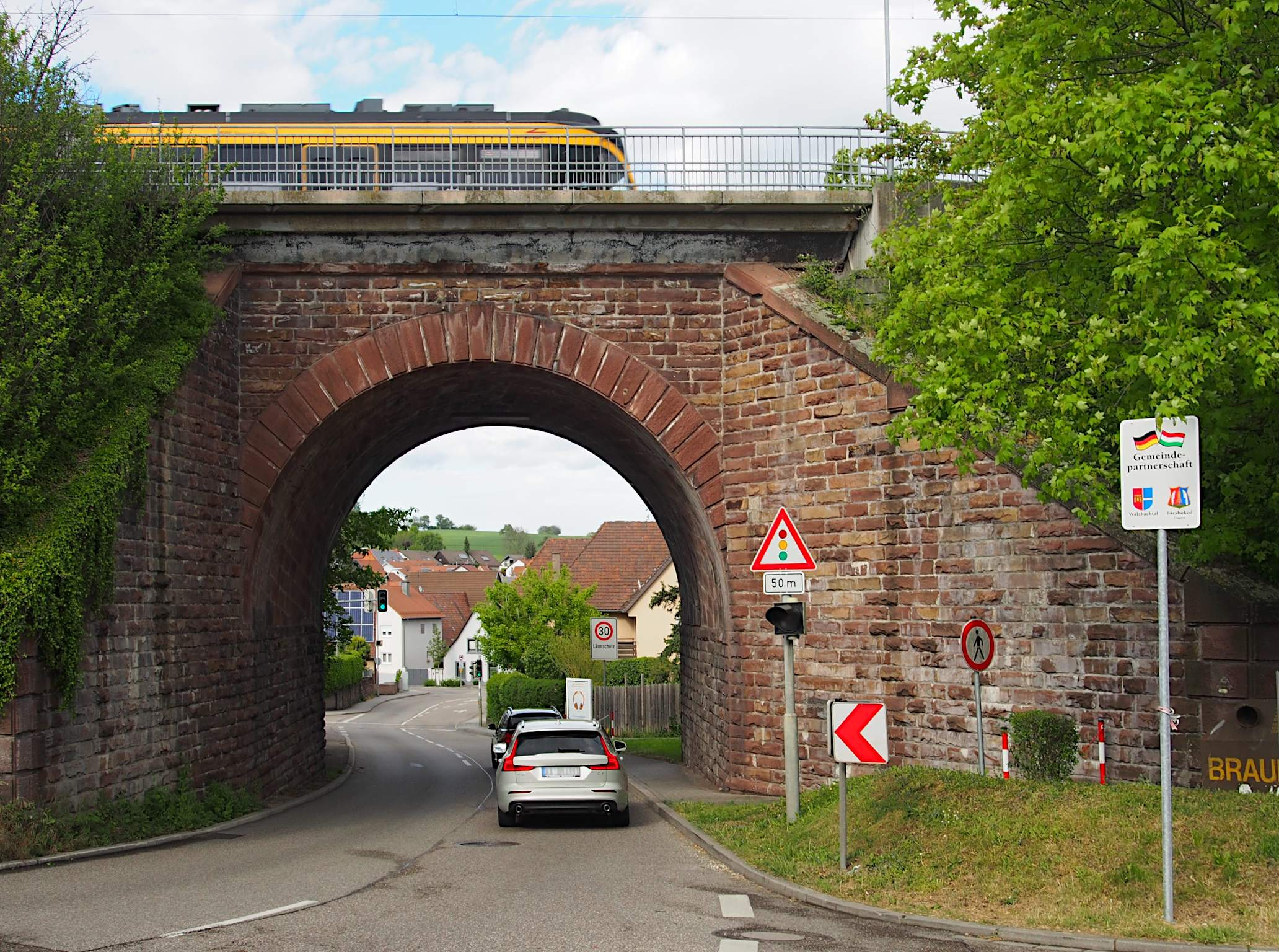
The crossing in 2020

Walzbachtal is a municipality in northwestern Karlsruhe district in Baden-Württemberg, Germany.

It was formed from the villages of Jöhlingen and Wössingen in 1971.
