= Forst (Baden) =

- Municipality
- Coat of arms

- Location of Forst within Karlsruhe district
- Interactive map of Forst
- Location within Germany Location within Baden-Württemberg
- Coordinates: 49°09′12″N 08°35′03″E
- Country: Germany
- State: Baden-Württemberg
- Admin. region: Karlsruhe
- District: Karlsruhe

Government
  - Mayor (2017–25): Bernd Killinger

Area
  - Total: 11.46 km^{2} (4.42 sq mi)
- Elevation: 112 m (367 ft)

Population (2025-12-31)
  - Total: 7,998
  - Density: 697.9/km^{2} (1,808/sq mi)
- Time zone: UTC+01:00 (CET)
  - Summer (DST): UTC+02:00 (CEST)
- Postal codes: 76694
- Dialling codes: 07251
- Vehicle registration: KA
- Website: www.forst-baden.de

Forst (German pronunciation: [fɔʁst]) is a municipality in the district of Karlsruhe in Baden-Württemberg, Germany. It is located on Bertha Benz Memorial Route 2 km north of Bruchsal and shares a direct border with that city.

== 1988 F-16C jet fighter crash ==
On March 31, 1988, a US Air Force F-16C jet fighter crashed into the town during a low-altitude exercise. After striking the roof of a house and badly damaging another, the aircraft slid down along the length of Forster Hardtstrasse, setting several houses on fire. The pilot, 24-year old Lt. Thomas Edward Doyle, and a resident, 62-year old Theo Huber, were killed.
