= Hambrücken =

- Municipality
- Coat of arms

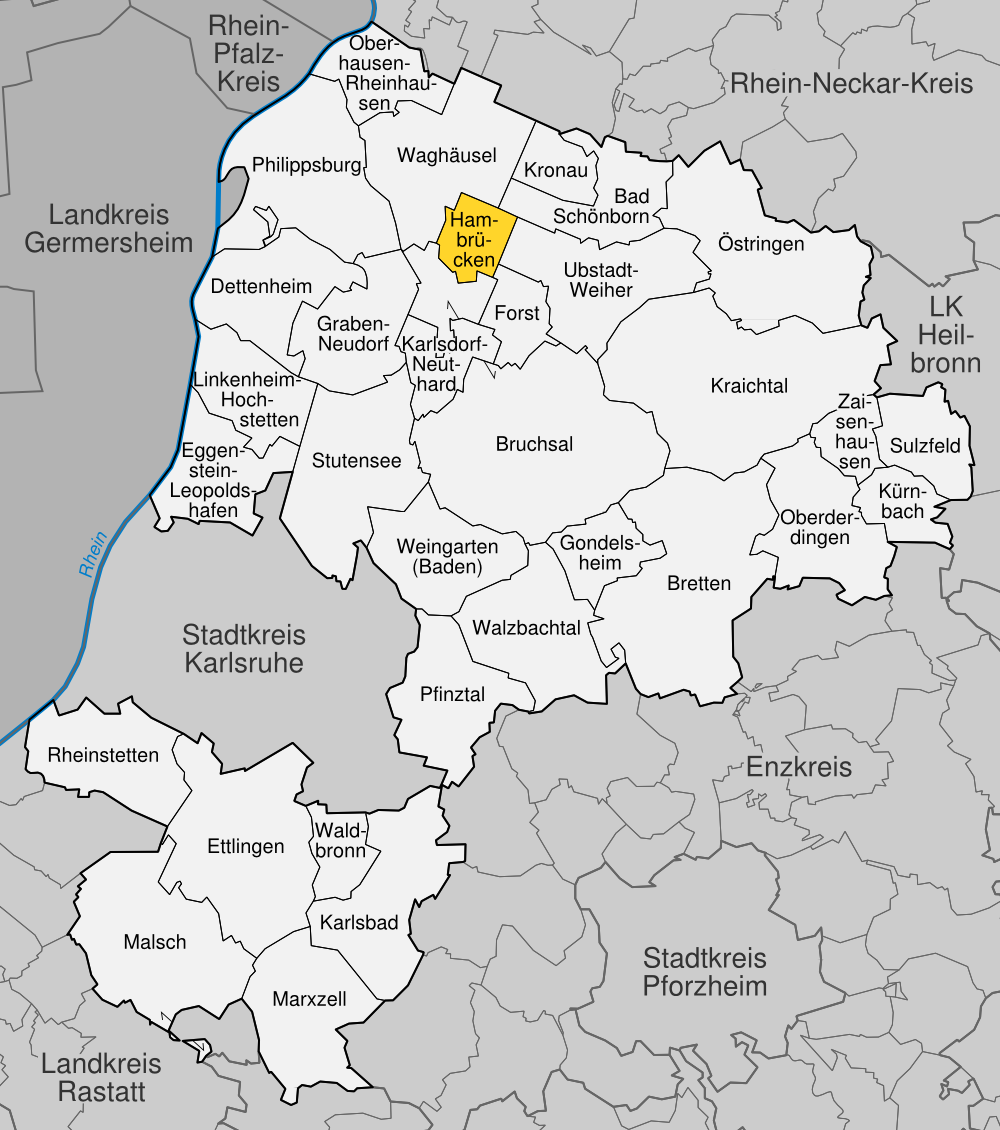
- Location of Hambrücken within Karlsruhe district
- Interactive map of Hambrücken
- Location within Germany Location within Baden-Württemberg
- Coordinates: 49°11′10″N 08°32′38″E
- Country: Germany
- State: Baden-Württemberg
- Admin. region: Karlsruhe
- District: Karlsruhe

Government
  - Mayor (2020–28): Marc Wagner

Area
  - Total: 10.97 km^{2} (4.24 sq mi)
- Elevation: 107 m (351 ft)

Population (2025-12-31)
  - Total: 5,687
  - Density: 518.4/km^{2} (1,343/sq mi)
- Time zone: UTC+01:00 (CET)
  - Summer (DST): UTC+02:00 (CEST)
- Postal codes: 76707
- Dialling codes: 07255
- Vehicle registration: KA
- Website: www.hambruecken.de

Hambrücken is a municipality in Northern Karlsruhe district in Baden-Württemberg, Germany, located on Bertha Benz Memorial Route. It is twinned with the town and commune of La Bouëxière, France.
