= Ubstadt-Weiher =

- Municipality
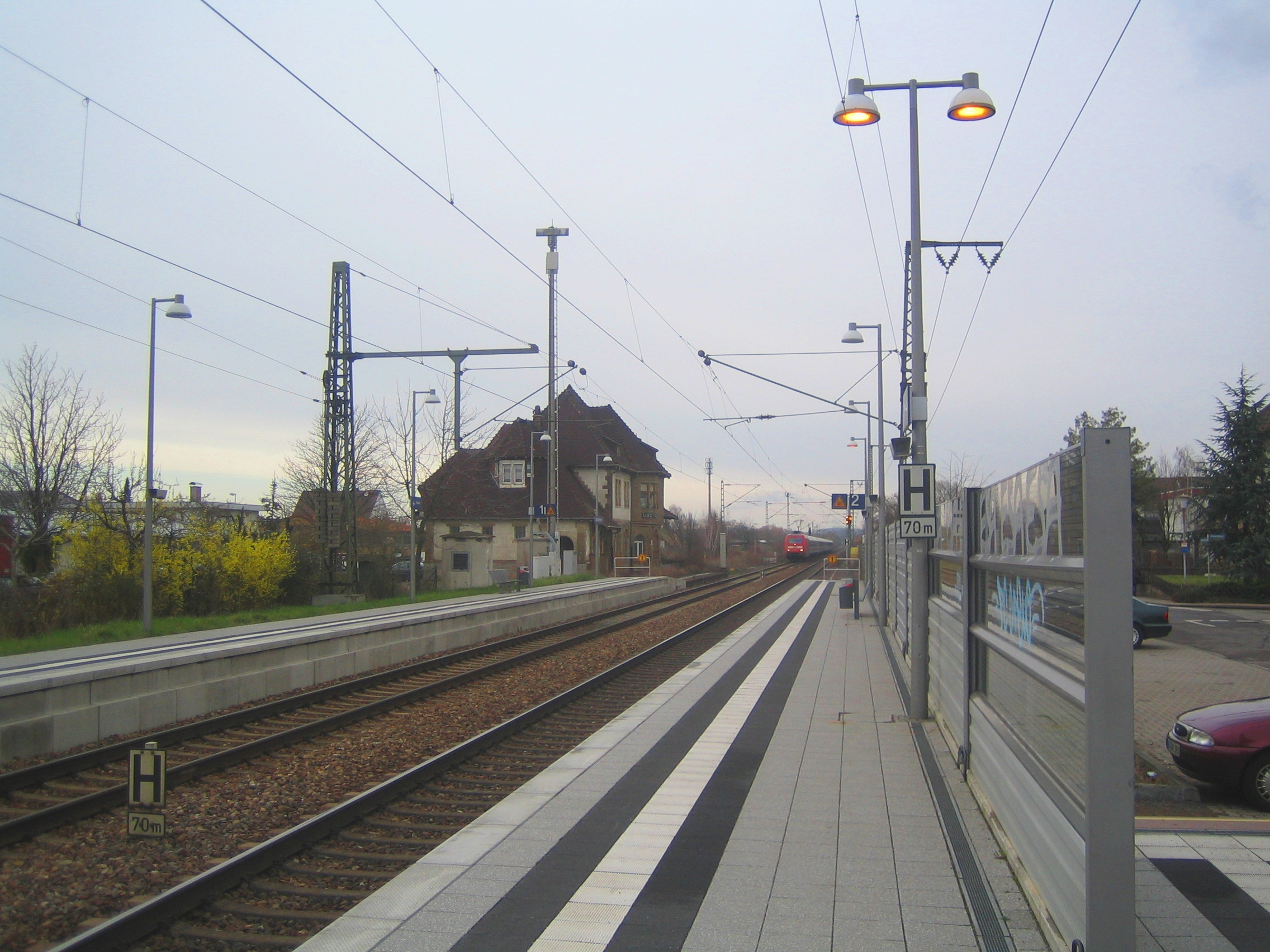

- Flag Coat of arms

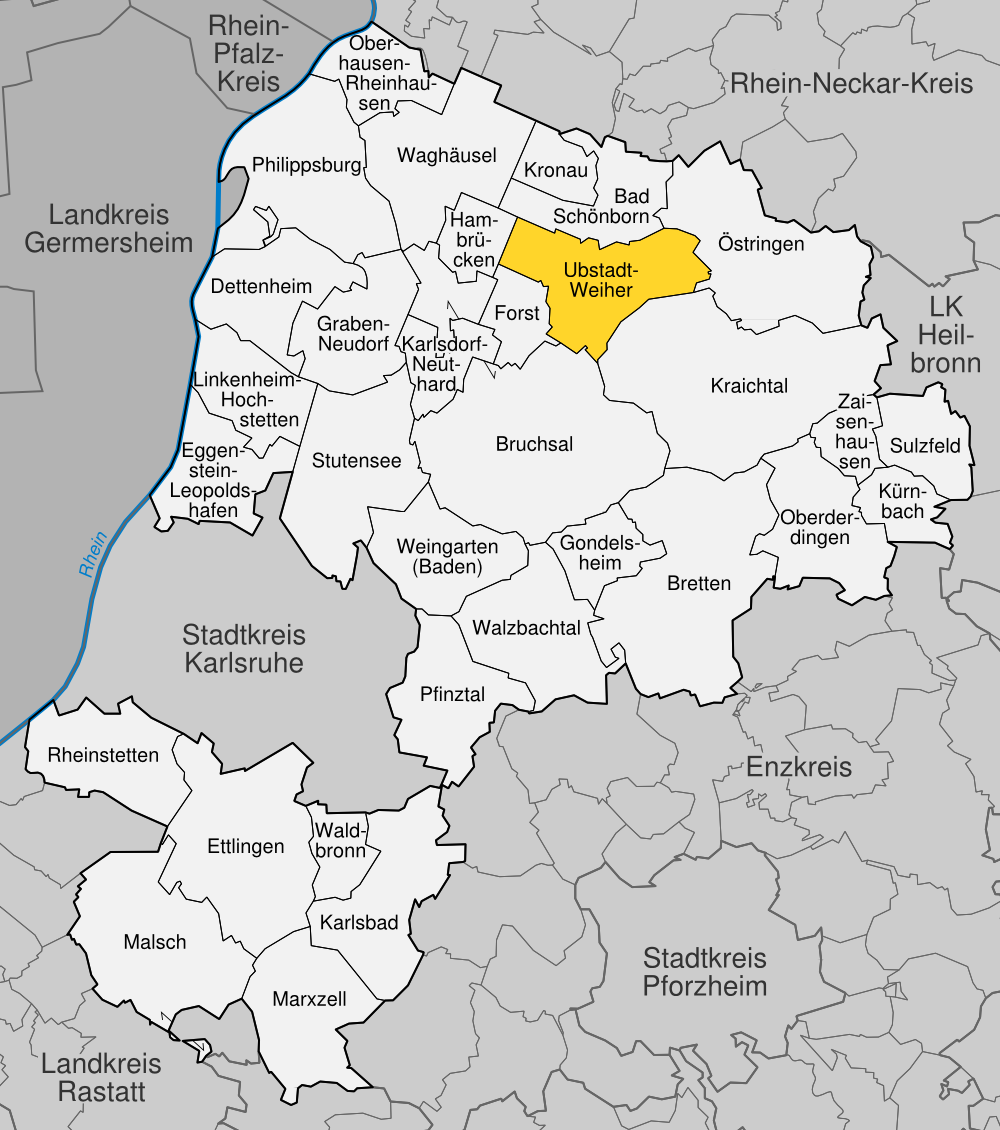
- Location of Ubstadt-Weiher within Karlsruhe district
- Interactive map of Ubstadt-Weiher
- Location within Germany Location within Baden-Württemberg
- Coordinates: 49°9′56″N 8°37′30″E
- Country: Germany
- State: Baden-Württemberg
- Admin. region: Karlsruhe
- District: Karlsruhe
- Subdivisions: 4

Government
  - Mayor (2018–26): Tony Löffler (CDU)

Area
  - Total: 36.48 km^{2} (14.09 sq mi)
- Elevation: 131 m (430 ft)

Population (2025-12-31)
  - Total: 13,077
  - Density: 358.5/km^{2} (928.4/sq mi)
- Time zone: UTC+01:00 (CET)
  - Summer (DST): UTC+02:00 (CEST)
- Postal codes: 76698
- Dialling codes: 07253, 07251
- Vehicle registration: KA
- Website: www.ubstadt-weiher.de

Ubstadt-Weiher is a municipality in northern Karlsruhe district in Baden-Württemberg, Germany. It is located on Bertha Benz Memorial Route.

The four villages that make up the municipality are (in order of size): Ubstadt, Weiher, Zeutern, and Stettfeld. The area in between and around these villages is numbered with grape vineyards. There are many wineries found in these villages.
