= Karlsdorf-Neuthard =

- Municipality
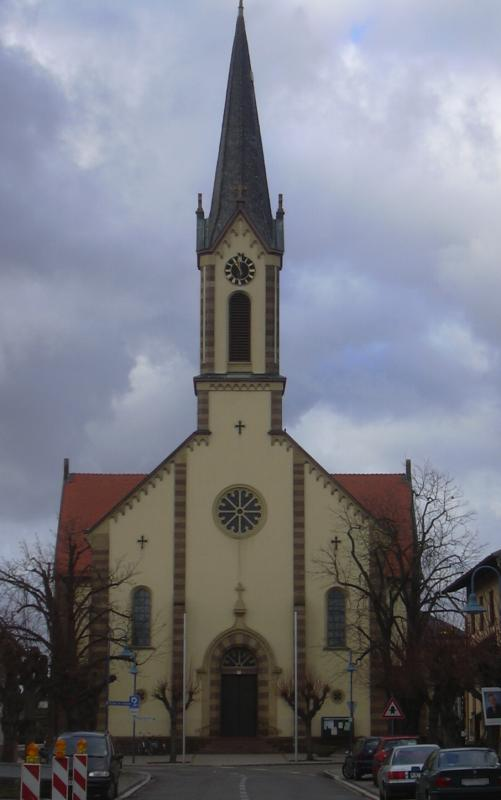

- Coat of arms

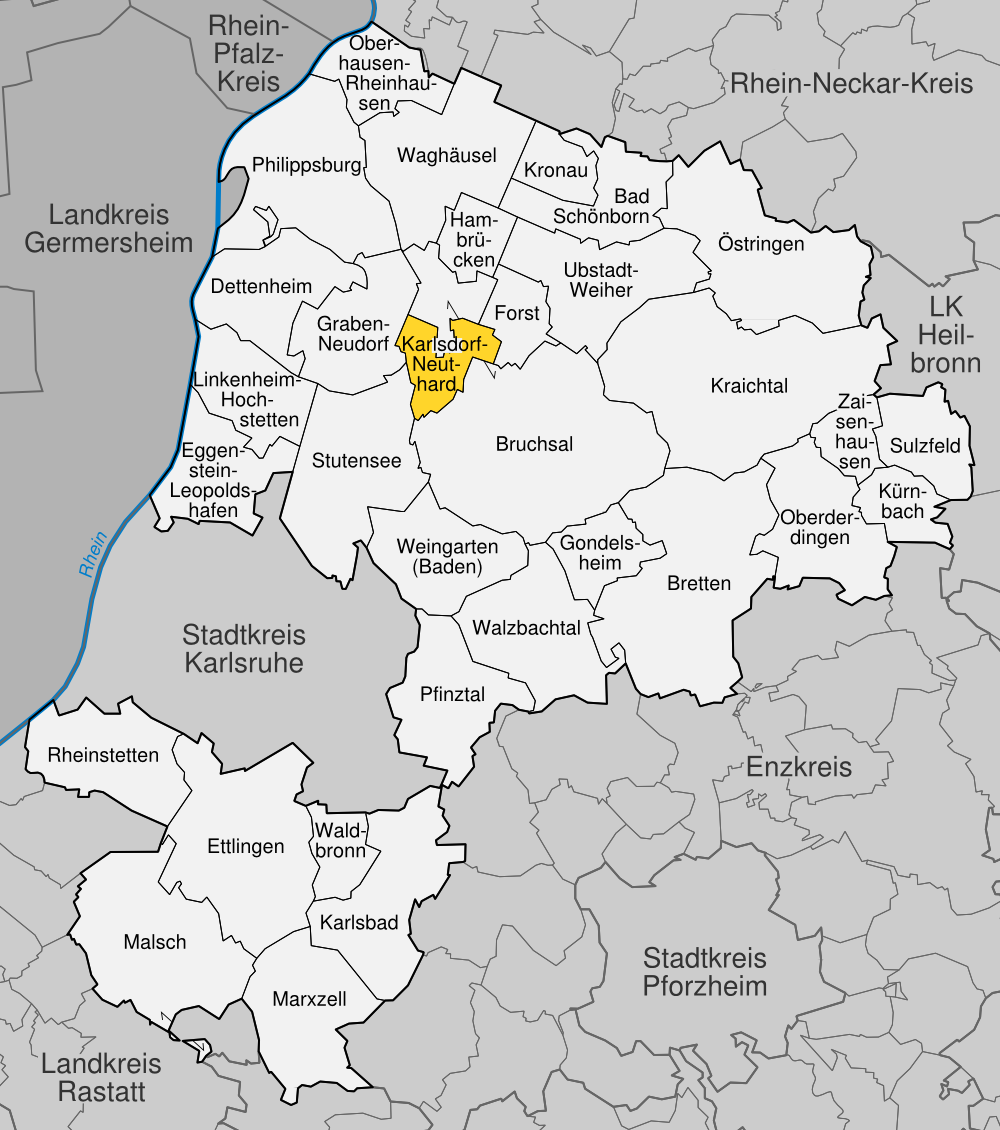
- Location of Karlsdorf-Neuthard within Karlsruhe district
- Interactive map of Karlsdorf-Neuthard
- Location within Germany Location within Baden-Württemberg
- Coordinates: 49°08′11″N 08°32′38″E
- Country: Germany
- State: Baden-Württemberg
- Admin. region: Karlsruhe
- District: Karlsruhe

Government
  - Mayor (2023–31): Sven Weigt

Area
  - Total: 14.01 km^{2} (5.41 sq mi)
- Elevation: 110 m (360 ft)

Population (2025-12-31)
  - Total: 10,673
  - Density: 761.8/km^{2} (1,973/sq mi)
- Time zone: UTC+01:00 (CET)
  - Summer (DST): UTC+02:00 (CEST)
- Postal codes: 76689
- Dialling codes: 07251
- Vehicle registration: KA
- Website: www.karlsdorf-neuthard.de

Karlsdorf-Neuthard is a municipality in the district of Karlsruhe in Baden-Württemberg, Germany.

== Location ==
Karlsdorf-Neuthard is located about 6 km to the west of Bruchsal and about 18 km to the northeast of Karlsruhe.

== History ==
The municipality of Karlsdorf-Neuthard was formed by a voluntary merger of the villages of Karlsdorf and Neuthard on January 1, 1975.

Karlsdorf was founded in 1813, when Dettenheim residents, who frequently experienced floods from the river Rhine, resettled on approval of Karl, Grand Duke of Baden within the confines of Altenbürg. The new settlement was named in honour of the Grand Duke.

Neuthard was documented for the first time in 1281. The village belonged to the Bishopric of Speyer and was assigned to the Grand Duchy of Baden in 1803.

== Demographics ==
Population development:

| Year | Inhabitants |
|---|---|
| 1990 | 8,388 |
| 2001 | 9,240 |
| 2011 | 9,909 |
| 2021 | 10,746 |

== Town twinning ==
Karlsdorf-Neuthard is twinned with Nyergesújfalu in Hungary.
