= Oberhausen-Rheinhausen =

- Municipality
- Coat of arms

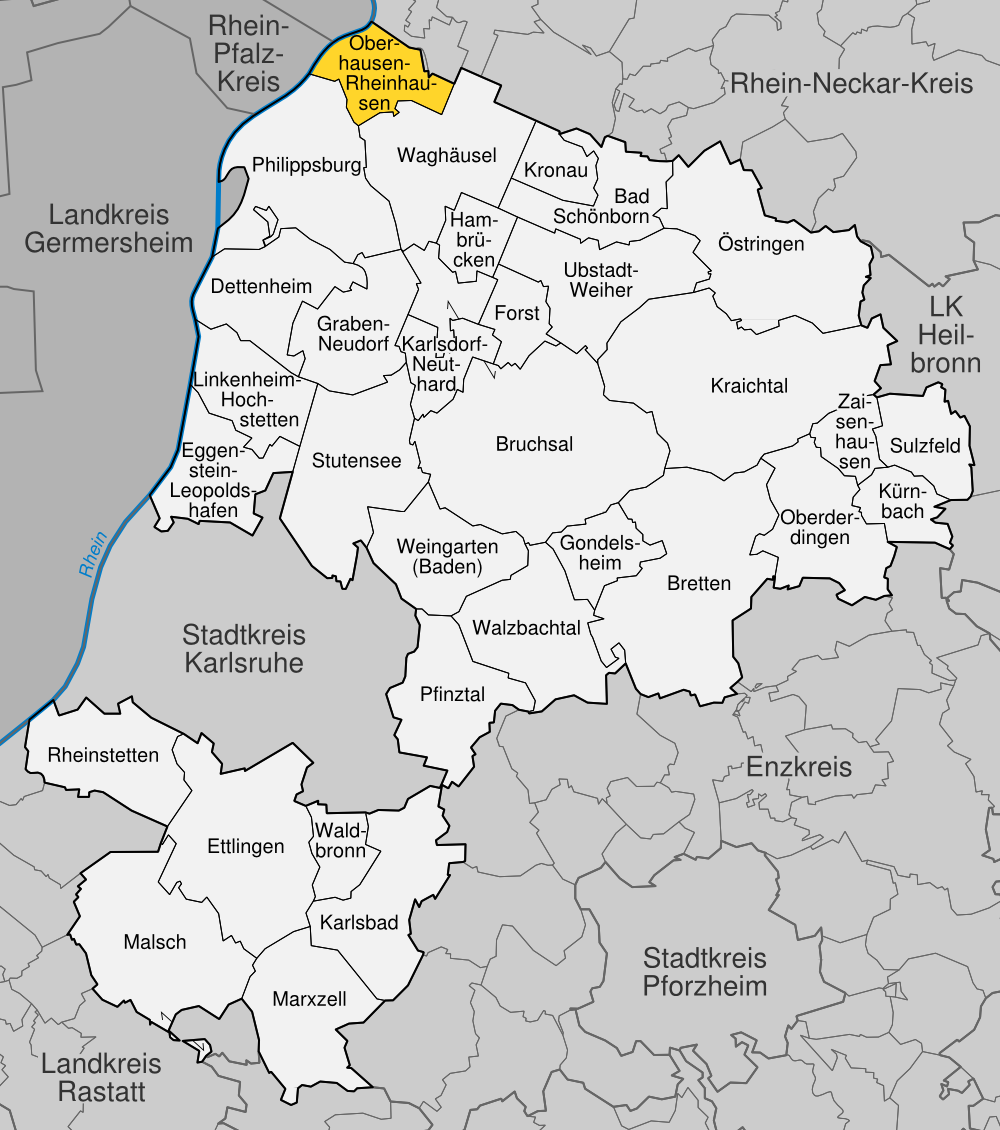
- Location of Oberhausen-Rheinhausen within Karlsruhe district
- Interactive map of Oberhausen-Rheinhausen
- Location within Germany Location within Baden-Württemberg
- Coordinates: 49°15′38″N 08°29′06″E
- Country: Germany
- State: Baden-Württemberg
- Admin. region: Karlsruhe
- District: Karlsruhe

Government
  - Mayor (2021–29): Manuel Scholl

Area
  - Total: 18.92 km^{2} (7.31 sq mi)
- Elevation: 99 m (325 ft)

Population (2025-12-31)
  - Total: 9,515
  - Density: 502.9/km^{2} (1,303/sq mi)
- Time zone: UTC+01:00 (CET)
  - Summer (DST): UTC+02:00 (CEST)
- Postal codes: 68790–68794
- Dialling codes: 07254
- Vehicle registration: KA
- Website: www.oberhausen-rheinhausen.de

Oberhausen-Rheinhausen (German pronunciation: [ˈoːbɐhaʊzn̩ ʁaɪnˈhaʊzn̩]) is a municipality in Northern Karlsruhe district in Baden-Württemberg, Germany.

== Demographics ==
Population development:

Year	Inhabitants
1990	8,767
2001	9,481
2011	9,472
2021	9,667
