= Östringen =

- Town
- Flag Coat of arms

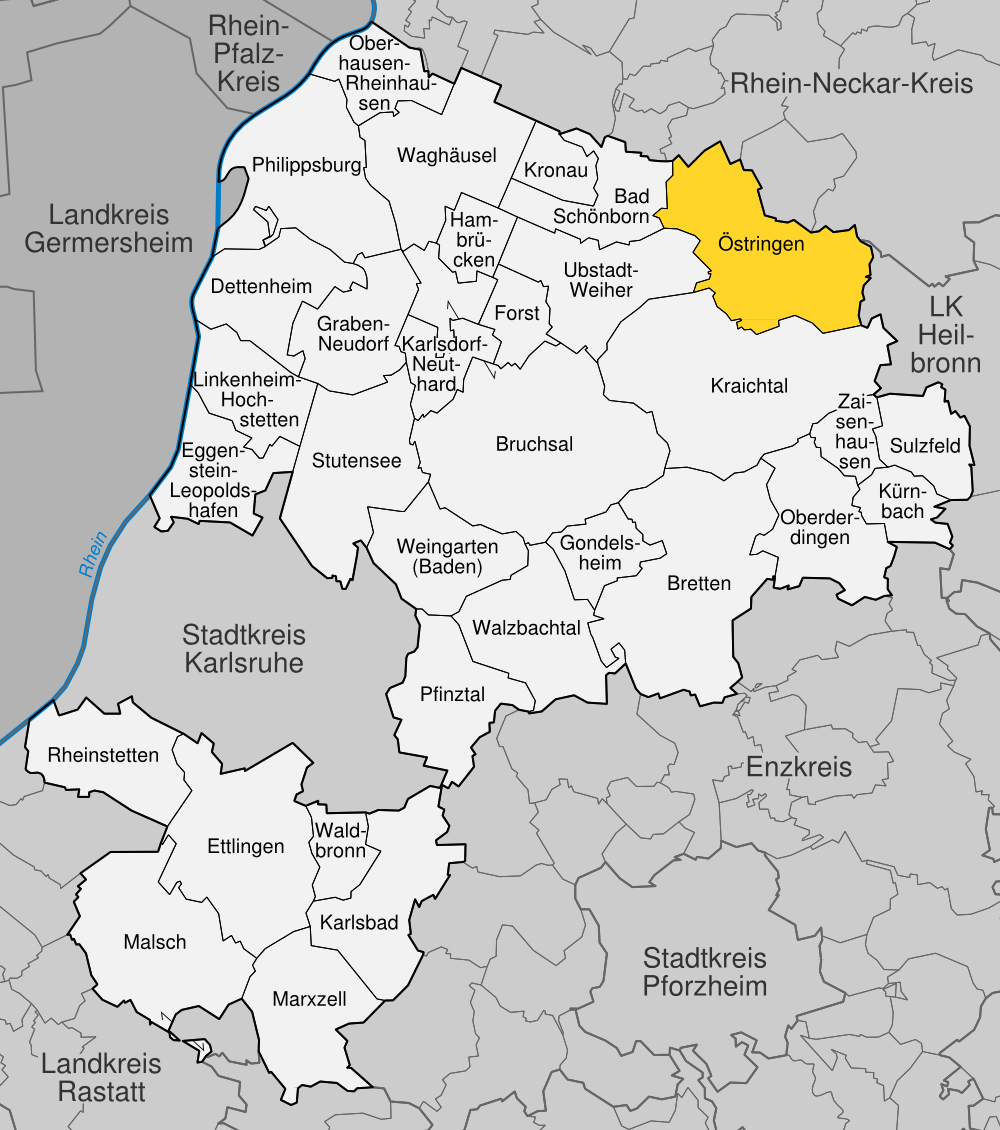
- Location of Östringen within Karlsruhe district
- Interactive map of Östringen
- Location within Germany Location within Baden-Württemberg
- Coordinates: 49°13′10″N 08°42′39″E
- Country: Germany
- State: Baden-Württemberg
- Admin. region: Karlsruhe
- District: Karlsruhe

Government
  - Mayor (2019–27): Felix Geider

Area
  - Total: 53.28 km^{2} (20.57 sq mi)
- Elevation: 163 m (535 ft)

Population (2025-12-31)
  - Total: 13,447
  - Density: 252.4/km^{2} (653.7/sq mi)
- Time zone: UTC+01:00 (CET)
  - Summer (DST): UTC+02:00 (CEST)
- Postal codes: 76677–76684
- Dialling codes: 07253, 07259
- Vehicle registration: KA
- Website: www.oestringen.de

Östringen (German pronunciation: [ˈøːstʁɪŋən]; South Franconian: Öschdringe) is a town in Northern Karlsruhe district in Baden-Württemberg, Germany. Östringen is a twin town with Abergavenny, South Wales. Until the district reform on January 1, 1973, Östringen means the district of Bruchsal. It was declared its own municipality by the state government in 1981 due to being a central place for local commerce.

Extensive deciduous forests take up about a third of the municipal area. The Freibach flows through the core town of Östringen, while the Katzbach flows through the Tiefenbach and Odenheim districts. In the 19th century, a flourishing cigar industry developed in Östringen and Odenheim. In Eichelberg and Tiefenbach, agriculture, especially viticulture, remained predominant.

== Neighboring communities ==
The following towns and municipalities border the town of Östringen, they are named clockwise starting in the east: Eppingen (Heilbronn district), Kraichtal, Ubstadt-Weiher, Bad Schönborn (all Karlsruhe districts).
