= Kronau (Baden) =

- Municipality
- Coat of arms

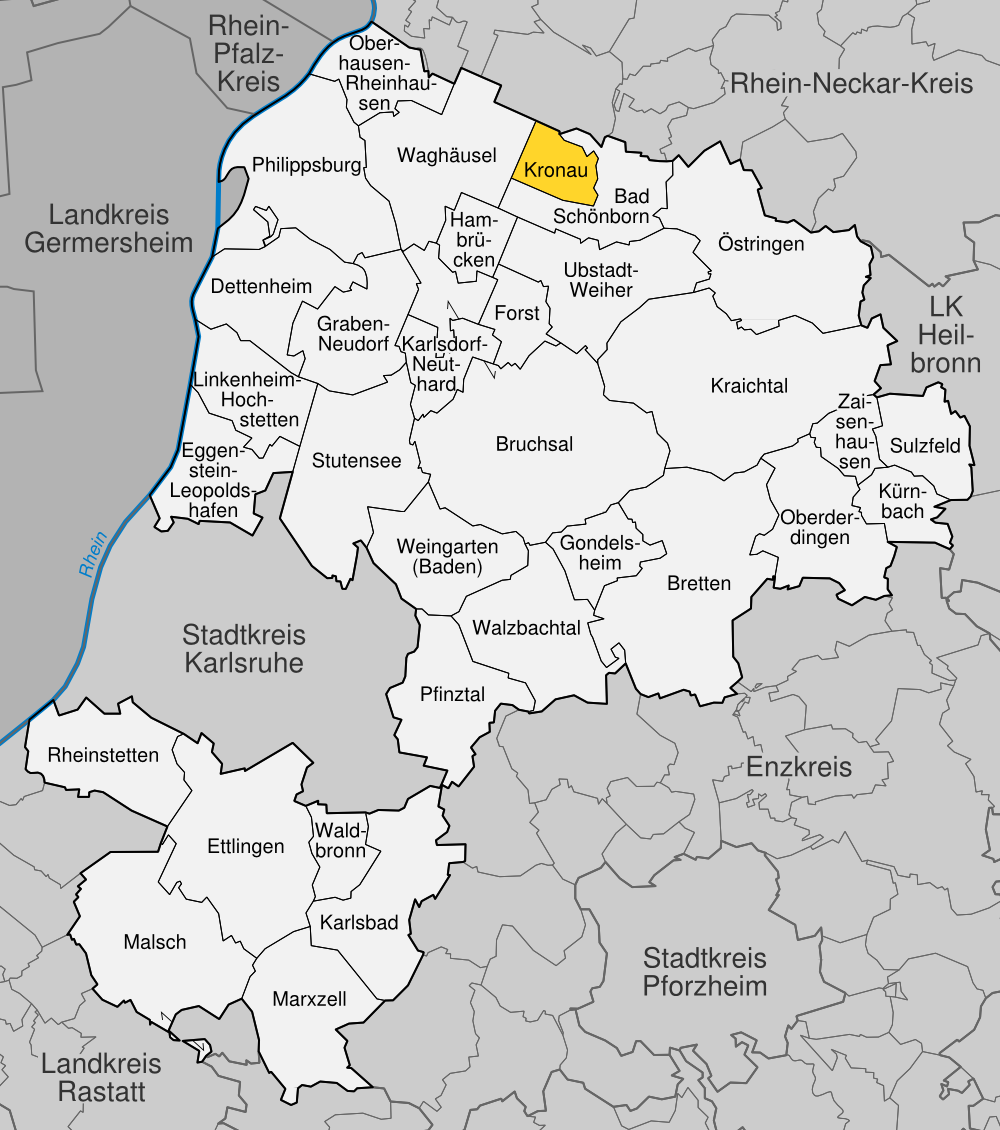
- Location of Kronau within Karlsruhe district
- Interactive map of Kronau
- Location within Germany Location within Baden-Württemberg
- Coordinates: 49°13′12″N 8°38′02″E
- Country: Germany
- State: Baden-Württemberg
- Admin. region: Karlsruhe
- District: Karlsruhe

Government
  - Mayor (2016–24): Frank Burkard (CDU)

Area
  - Total: 10.9 km^{2} (4.2 sq mi)
- Elevation: 110 m (360 ft)

Population (2025-12-31)
  - Total: 6,077
  - Density: 558/km^{2} (1,440/sq mi)
- Time zone: UTC+01:00 (CET)
  - Summer (DST): UTC+02:00 (CEST)
- Postal codes: 76709
- Dialling codes: 07253
- Vehicle registration: KA
- Website: www.kronau.de

Kronau (German pronunciation: [ˈkʁoːnaʊ]) is a municipality in the Northern Karlsruhe district in Baden-Württemberg, Germany.

== Demographics ==
Population development:

Year	Inhabitants
1990	4806
2001	5575
2011	5529
2021	5966
