= Karlsruhe (district) =

District in Baden-Württemberg, Germany

- District
- Flag Coat of arms
- Coordinates: 49°05′N 8°35′E
- Country: Germany
- State: Baden-Württemberg
- Adm. region: Karlsruhe
- Capital: Karlsruhe

Government
  - District admin.: Christoph Schnaudigel (CDU)

Area
  - Total: 1,084.88 km^{2} (418.87 sq mi)

Population (31 December 2023)
  - Total: 455,350
  - Density: 420/km^{2} (1,100/sq mi)
- Time zone: UTC+01:00 (CET)
  - Summer (DST): UTC+02:00 (CEST)
- Vehicle registration: KA, BR
- Website: www.landkreis-karlsruhe.de

Karlsruhe is a Landkreis (district) in the northwest of Baden-Württemberg, Germany. Neighboring districts are (from north clockwise) Rhein-Neckar, Heilbronn, Enz, Calw, Rastatt, Germersheim, Rhein-Pfalz-Kreis and the district-free city Speyer. The urban district Karlsruhe (Stadtkreis Karlsruhe), which contains the City of Karlsruhe, is located in the middle of the district, and partially cuts it into a northern and a southern part.

== History ==
The historic origin of the district is the Oberamt Karlsruhe. In 1809 it was split into one part responsible for the city Karlsruhe (Stadtamt), and one for the surrounding municipalities (Landamt). In 1865 however both parts were merged again to the Bezirksamt Karlsruhe. 1938 it was split again, this time with the district of Karlsruhe for the surrounding part, and the urban district of Karlsruhe for the urban area. In 1973 the district was enlarged by adding the complete district of Bruchsal and parts of the districts Sinsheim, Vaihingen, Pforzheim and Rastatt; some municipalities were also added to the city Karlsruhe and therefore left the district.

Since the founding of the Federal Republic, Karlsruhe has been the seat of the Federal Constitutional Court (Bundesverfassungsgericht), Germany's highest.

== Geography ==
The western part of the district is located in the Rhine valley. The area in the east belongs to the landscape of the Kraichgau, and it is also to the north of the foothills of the Black Forest.

== Coat of arms ==
The top-left quarter of the coat of arms shows the symbol of Baden, as a large part of the Karlsruhe district belonged to Baden historically. The cross in the top-right is the symbol of the clerical state of Speyer. The three deer antlers at the bottom-right are the symbol of the state of Württemberg, and at the bottom-left is the symbol of the Wittelsbach family.

== Towns and municipalities ==
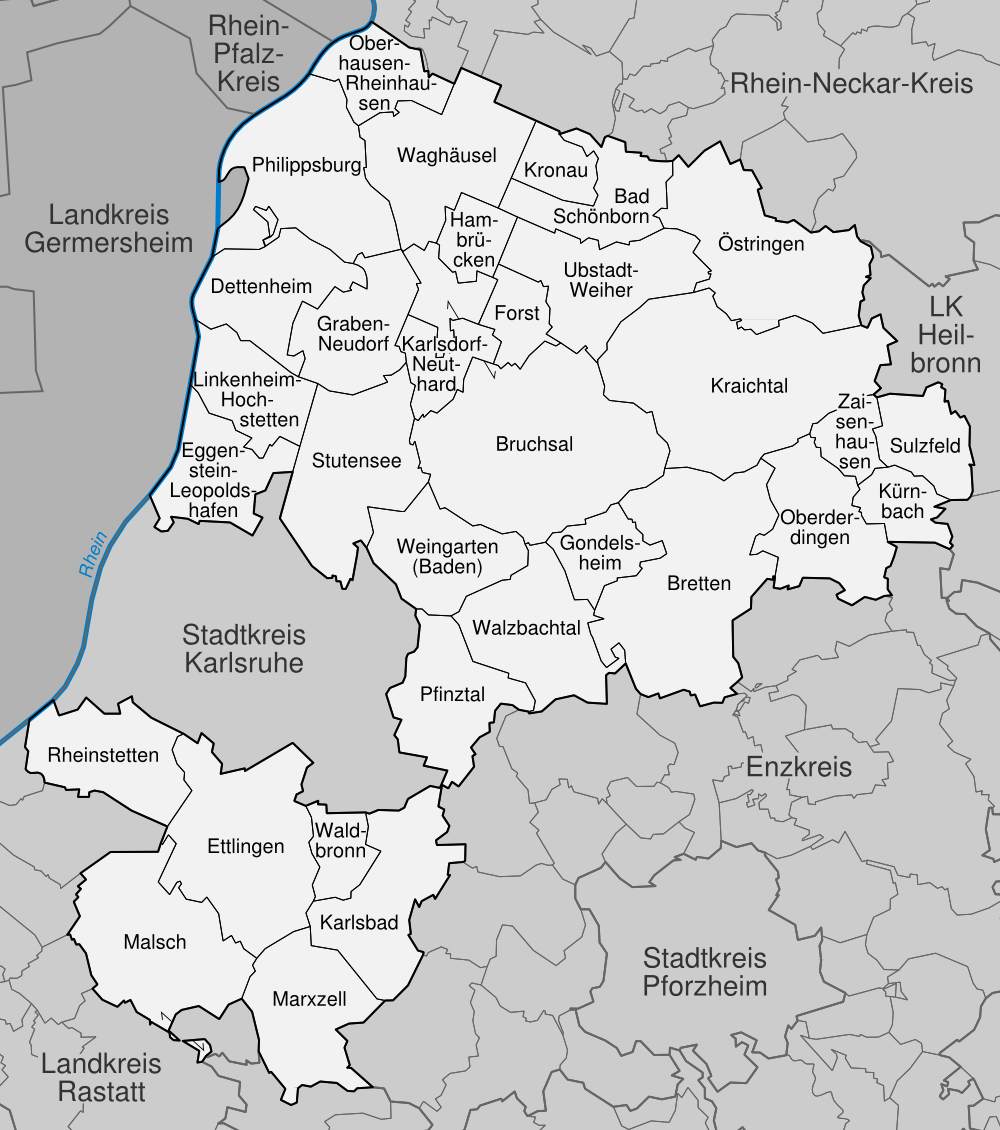
Clickable map of towns and municipalities in the district

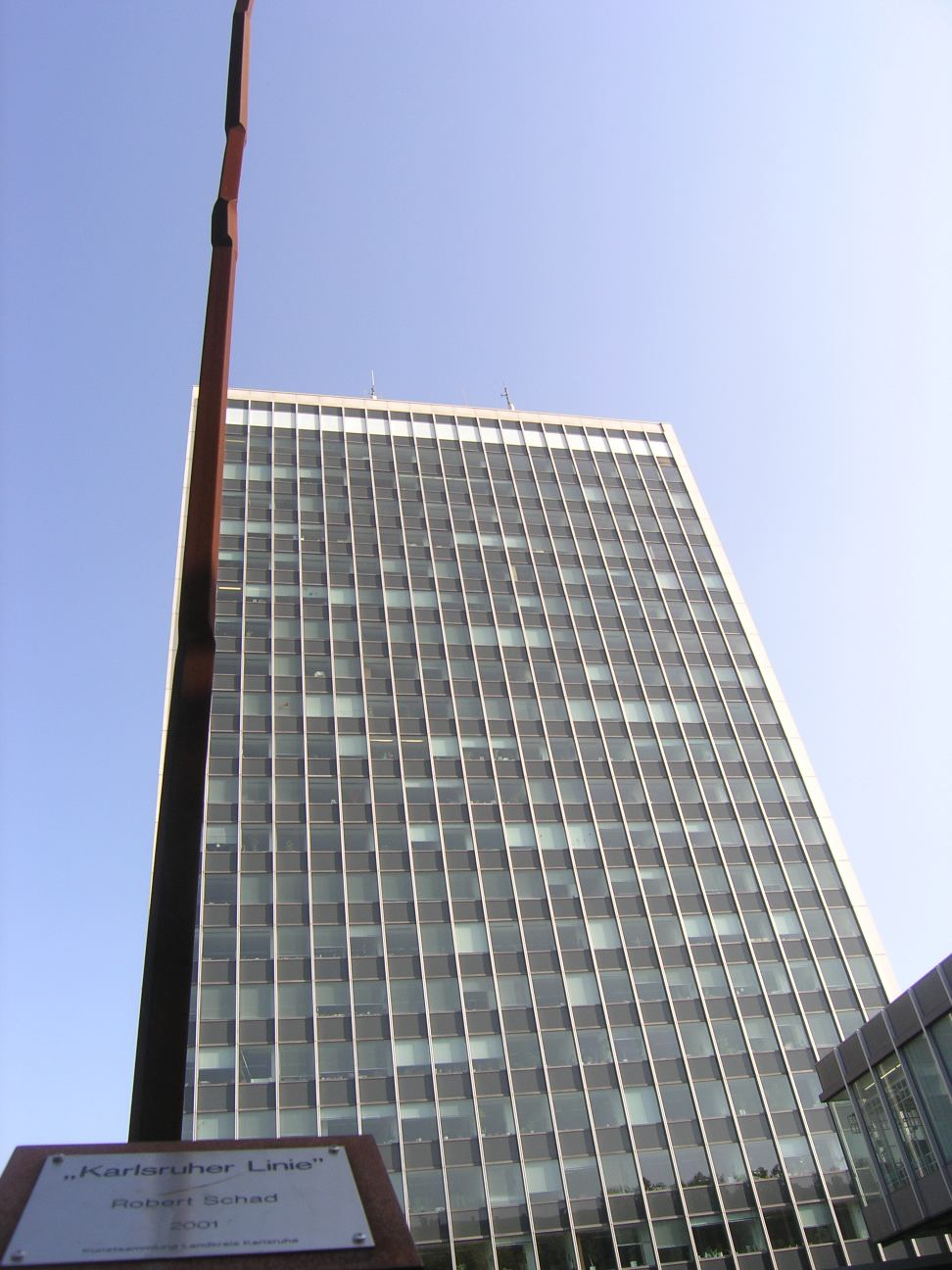
District administration building

Towns
1. Bretten
2. Bruchsal
3. Ettlingen
4. Kraichtal
5. Oberderdingen
6. Östringen
7. Philippsburg
8. Rheinstetten
9. Stutensee
10. Waghäusel
Municipal co-operations
1. Bad Schönborn
2. Bretten
3. Bruchsal
4. Graben-Neudorf
5. Oberderdingen
6. Phillipsburg
7. Sulzfeld
Municipalities
1. Bad Schönborn
2. Dettenheim
3. Eggenstein-Leopoldshafen
4. Forst (Baden)
5. Gondelsheim
6. Graben-Neudorf
7. Hambrücken
8. Karlsbad (Baden)
9. Karlsdorf-Neuthard
10. Kronau
11. Kürnbach

12. Linkenheim-Hochstetten
13. Malsch
14. Marxzell
15. Oberhausen-Rheinhausen
16. Pfinztal
17. Sulzfeld
18. Ubstadt-Weiher
19. Waldbronn
20. Walzbachtal
21. Weingarten (Baden)
22. Zaisenhausen

== Partnerships/Twin regions ==
The Karlsruhe district partners with the following sister regions outside of Germany:

- Gwent, United Kingdom (former administrative area in southeast Wales), since 1978. In 1996, due to an administrative reform, Gwent was abolished and divided into five districts, of which Karlsruhe mainly continues the partnership with the new districts of Monmouthshire and Torfaen.
- (Israel) Sha’ar Hanegev (region in the northwestern Negev, bounded on the west by the Gaza Strip), since 1992
- Brusque, Brazil (city in southern Brazil), since 2011

Within Germany, the Karlsruhe district has a partnership with the Saxon district Mittelsachsen, which was formed in 2008 through a merger of the former districts Döbeln, Freiberg und Mittweida; this relationship dates from 1990 when Karlsruhe district first partnered with Döbeln.
