= Bretten (electoral district) =

State electoral district of Germany

30: Bretten
- Electoral district for the Landtag of Baden-Württemberg
- Bretten in 2026
- District: Karlsruhe
- Electorate: 116,617 (2026)
- Major settlements: Bretten, Dettenheim, Eggenstein-Leopoldshafen, Gondelsheim, Graben-Neudorf, Kraichtal, Kürnbach, Linkenheim-Hochstetten, Oberderdingen, Stutensee, Sulzfeld, Walzbachtal, Weingarten (Baden), and Zaisenhausen

Current electoral district
- Party: CDU
- Member: Ansgar Mayr

Bretten is an electoral constituency (German: Wahlkreis) represented in the Landtag of Baden-Württemberg.

Since 2026, it has elected one member via first-past-the-post voting. Voters cast a second vote under which additional seats are allocated proportionally state-wide. Under the constituency numbering system, it is designated as constituency 30.

It is wholly within the district of Karlsruhe.

== Geography ==
The constituency includes the municipalities of Bretten, Dettenheim, Eggenstein-Leopoldshafen, Gondelsheim, Graben-Neudorf, Kraichtal, Kürnbach, Linkenheim-Hochstetten, Oberderdingen, Stutensee, Sulzfeld, Walzbachtal, Weingarten (Baden), and Zaisenhausen, within the district of Karlsruhe.

There were 116,617 eligible voters in 2026.

== Members ==
=== First mandate ===
Both prior to and since the electoral reforms for the 2026 election, the winner of the plurality of the vote (first-past-the-post) in every constituency won the first mandate.

Election	Member	Party	%
1976	Helmut Wirth	CDU	
1980	Helmut Wirth	CDU	
1984	Helmut Wirth	CDU	
1988	Franz Wieser	CDU	
1992	Franz Wieser	CDU	
1996	Franz Wieser	CDU	
2001	Franz Wieser	CDU	44.6
2006	Joachim Kößler	CDU	43.6
2011	Joachim Kößler	CDU	40.4
2016	Andrea Schwarz	Grüne	27.5
2021	Andrea Schwarz	Grüne	32.0
2026	Ansgar Mayr	CDU	34.5

=== Second mandate ===
Prior to the electoral reforms for the 2026 election, the seats in the state parliament were allocated proportionately amongst parties which received more than 5% of valid votes across the state. The seats that were won proportionally for parties that did not win as many first mandates as seats they were entitled to, were allocated to their candidates which received the highest proportion of the vote in their respective constituencies. This meant that following some elections, a constituency would have one or more members elected under a second mandate.

Prior to 2011, these second mandates were allocated to the party candidates who got the greatest number of votes, whilst from 2011-2021, these were allocated according to percentage share of the vote.

Prior to 1980, this constituency did not elect any members on a second mandate.

Election	Member	Party	Member	Party
1980	Peter Wintruff	SPD		
1984				
1988	Peter Wintruff	SPD		
1992	Peter Wintruff	SPD		
1993	Peter Wintruff	SPD	Bernhard Amann	REP
1996	Peter Wintruff	SPD		
2001	Peter Wintruff	SPD		
2006	Ute Vogt	SPD		
Oct 2009	Wolfgang Wehowsky	SPD		
2011				
2016	Joachim Kößler	CDU		
2021	Joachim Kößler	CDU	Christian Jung	FDP

== Election results ==
=== 2026 election ===
State election (2026): Bretten
Notes:	Blue background denotes the winner of the electorate vote. Pink background denotes a candidate elected from their party list. Yellow background denotes an electorate win by a list member, or other incumbent. A ✓ or ✗ denotes status of any incumbent, win or lose respectively.						
Party	Candidate	Votes	%	±%	Party votes	%	±%
CDU	Ansgar Mayr	28,346	34.5	▲11.5	24,763	30.0	▲7.0
Greens	Pascal Haggenmüller	20,486	24.9	▼7.1	22,677	27.4	▼4.6
AfD	Andreas Laitenberger	17,194	20.9	▲9.7	16,779	20.3	▲9.1
SPD	Beate Essafi	7,428	9.0	▼1.8	5,179	6.3	▼4.6
FDP	Christian Jung	4,853	5.9	▼5.5	3,742	4.5	▼6.8
Left	Amely Pol	3,846	4.7	▲1.9	3,043	3.7	▲0.9
FW					1,887	2.3	▼1.2
BSW					1,184	1.4	
APT					978	1.2	
Volt					782	0.9	
PARTEI					403	0.5	▼1.3
Bündnis C					233	0.3	
dieBasis					191	0.2	▼0.9
Values					177	0.2	
Pensioners					160	0.2	
Team Todenhöfer					143	0.2	
ÖDP					123	0.1	
Verjüngungsforschung					71	0.1	
PdF					55	0.1	
KlimalisteBW					48	0.1	▼1.2
Humanists					36	0.0	
Informal votes		1,064			563		
Total valid votes		82,153			82,654		
Turnout		83,217	71.4	▲5.5			
CDU gain from Greens	Majority	7,860	9.6				

=== 2021 election ===
State election (2026): Bretten
Party	Candidate	Votes	%	±%
Greens	Andrea Schwarz	23,870	32.0	▲4.5
CDU	Ansgar Mayr	17,126	23.0	▼4.2
FDP	Christian Jung	8,468	11.4	▲3.1
AfD	Andreas Laitenberger	8,368	11.2	▼7.3
SPD	Stephan Walter	8,066	10.8	▼1.3
FW	Bernd Barutta	2,570	3.5	
Left	Heinz-Peter Schwertges	2,108	2.8	▲0.6
PARTEI	Sascha Oehme	1,301	1.7	▲0.7
KlimalisteBW	Johanna Kirschke	971	1.3	
dieBasis	Thorsten Gary	869	1.2	
WiR2020	Jürgen Beck	763	1.0	
Majority		6,744	9.0	
Rejected ballots		720	1.0	Steady
Turnout		75,200	65.9	▼6.2
Registered electors		114,197		
Greens hold		Swing		

== See also ==
- Politics of Baden-Württemberg
- Landtag of Baden-Württemberg
