= Münzesheim =

- Ortsteil of Kraichtal
- Coat of arms
- Interactive map of Münzesheim
- Location within Germany Location within Baden-Württemberg
- Coordinates: 49°07′19″N 08°42′59″E
- Country: Germany
- State: Baden-Württemberg
- District: Karlsruhe
- Town: Kraichtal

Area
  - Total: 11.80 km^{2} (4.56 sq mi)
- Elevation: 177 m (581 ft)

Population (2020)
  - Total: 2,967
  - Density: 251.4/km^{2} (651.2/sq mi)
- Time zone: UTC+01:00 (CET)
  - Summer (DST): UTC+02:00 (CEST)
- Postal codes: 76703
- Dialling codes: 07250

Münzesheim is a part of the town Kraichtal in the district of Karlsruhe in northwestern of Baden-Württemberg, Germany.

== Geography ==
Münzesheim lies in the hills of the Kraichgau on the flat end of left slope of the Kraichbachvalley. The district area is 11.80 km^{2}.

== History ==
828 was first mentioned as Muncinesheim, the place was ruled from 1109 to 1282 by a local aristocracy. In 1326 it became part of Baden, as a fief to the Hofwart family of Kirchheim. The suzerainty probably comes from the Counts of Eberstein and thus of the Kraichgau knights. The fiefdom converted to protestantism in 1530. After reversion of the feud in 1675 Margrave Frederick of Baden gave Münzesheim to his two illegitimate sons, which styled themselves Barons of Münzesheim. Friedrich August of Münzesheim sold the community in 1761 back to the feudal lord, but Baden had to recognize the tax sovereignty of the Kraichgauer knighthood until 1805. From 1805 to 1807 Münzesheim belonged to the District Office Bretten, then to the Town Office Gochsheim. Finally in 1813 temporarily to the city office and the first land office Bruchsal and from December 1813 to the district office Bretten again. 1936 Münzesheim came to the district office Bruchsal.

On 1 September 1971 Gochsheim (Baden) was united with Unteröwisheim and the communities Bahnbrücken, Landshausen, Menzingen (Baden), Münzesheim, Neuenbürg (Baden), Oberacker und Oberöwisheim to the new city of Kraichtal.

In 2020 Münzesheim had 2,967 inhabitants.

== Crest ==
The former Crest of Münzesheim shows a red heart in gold topped with a silver ring.

== Sights ==
The Protestant Church of St. Martin's subordinate in the 13th century the patronage of the Counts of Eberstein; the present church was built new in 1856. The Catholic Church of St. Andrew was built in 1963/65. Among the historic buildings of the town include the Old Forge.

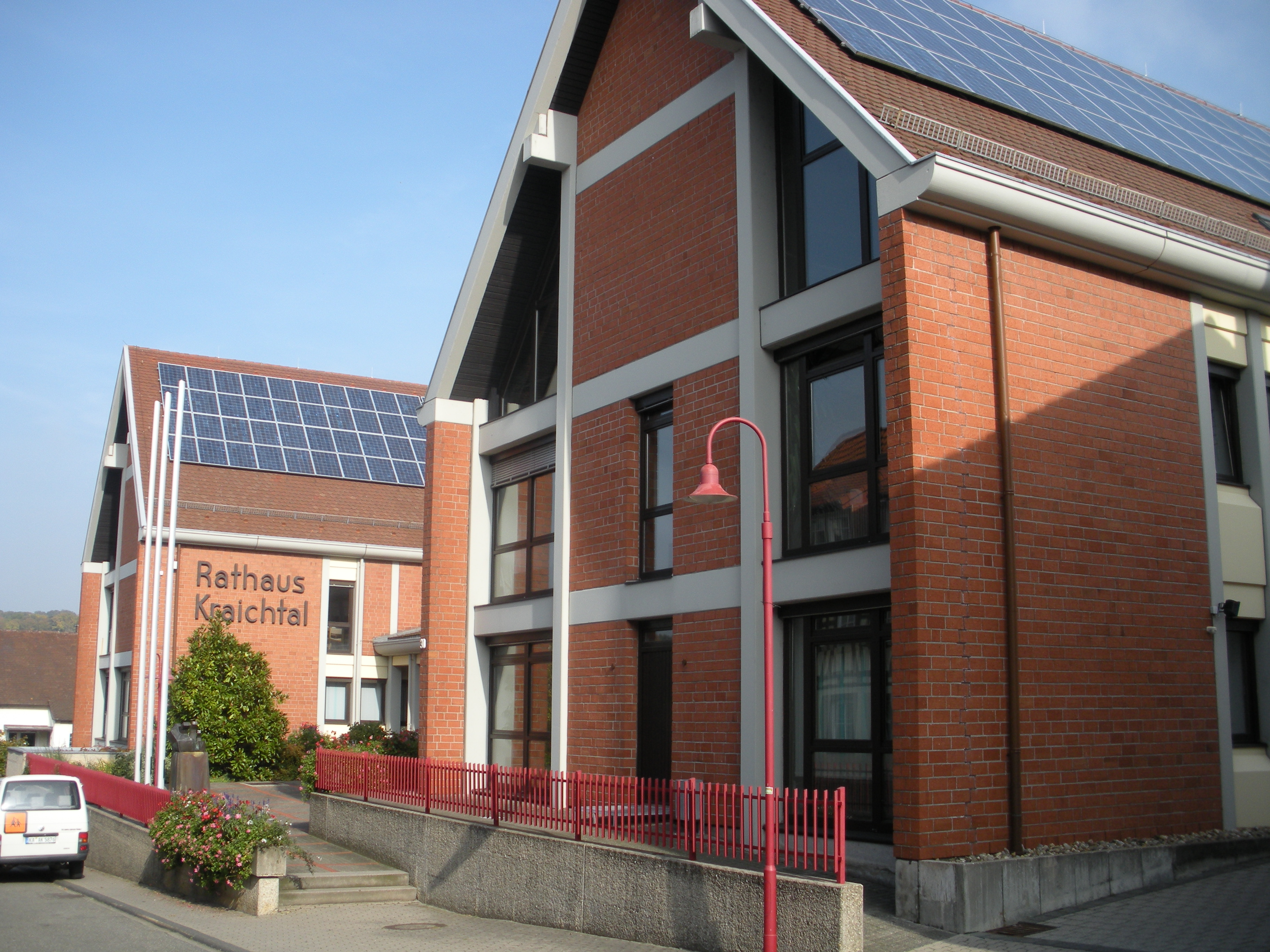
City Hall Kraichtal

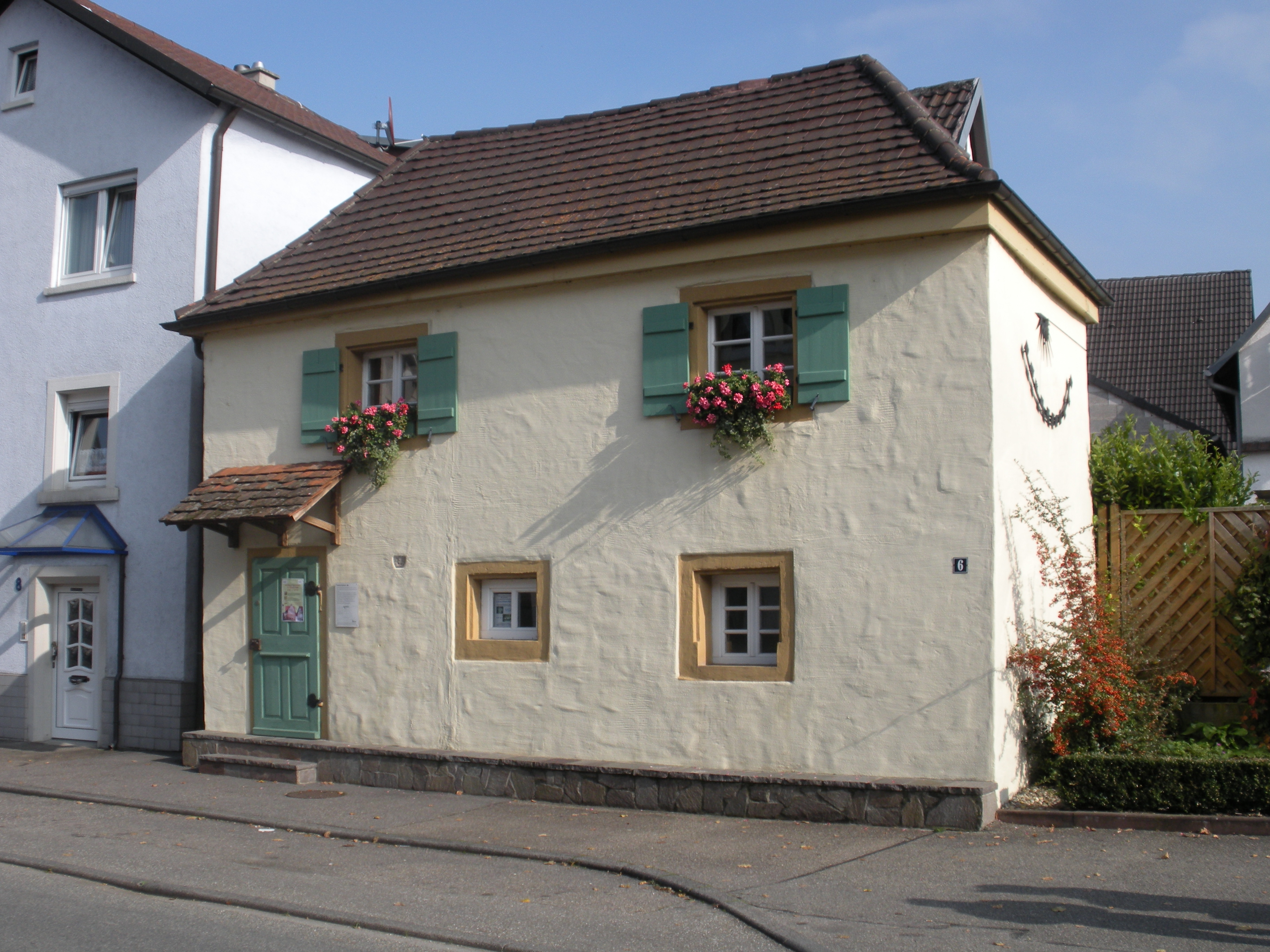
"Torwächterhaus" Münzesheim

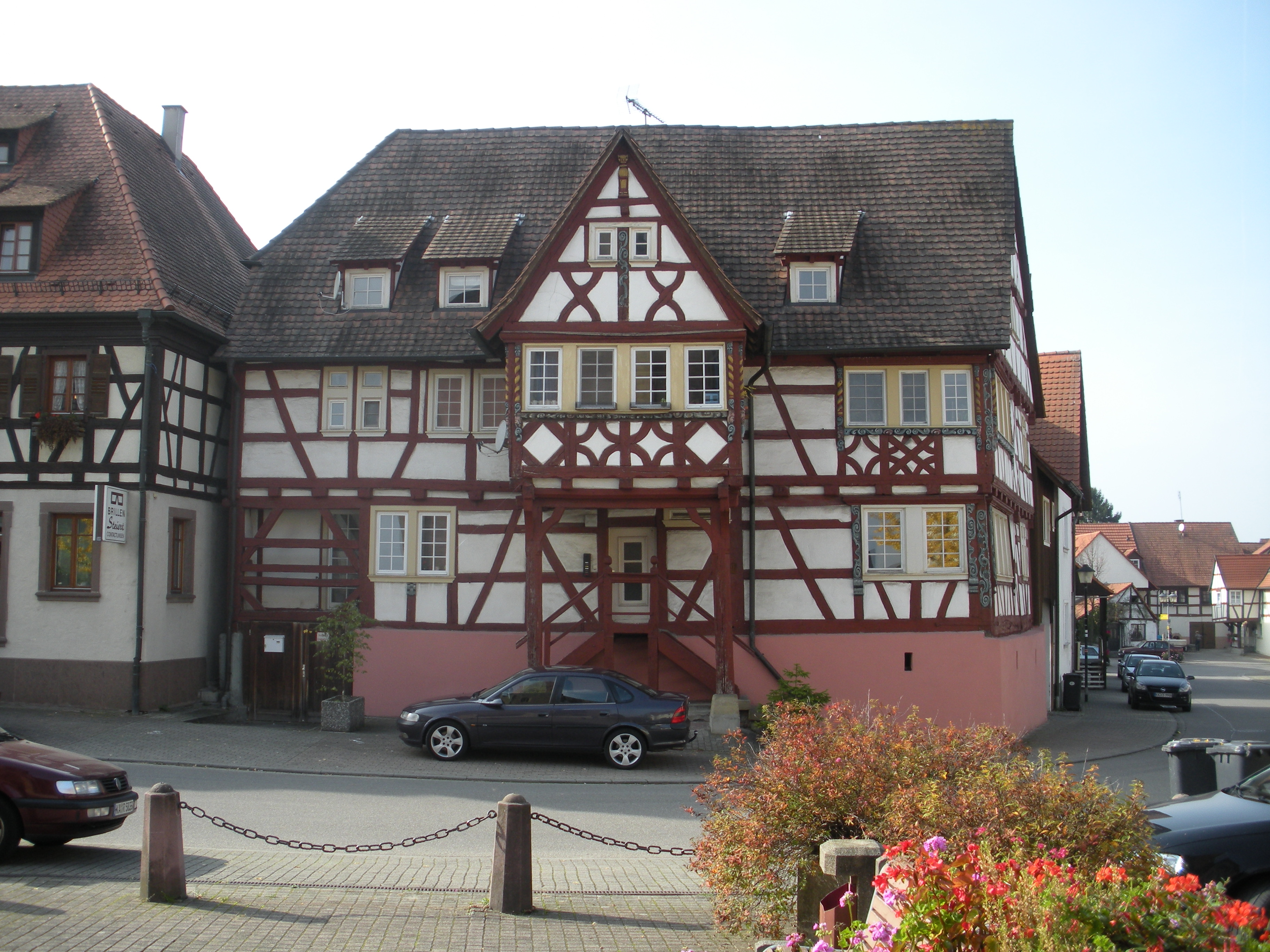
Old Forge in Münzesheim

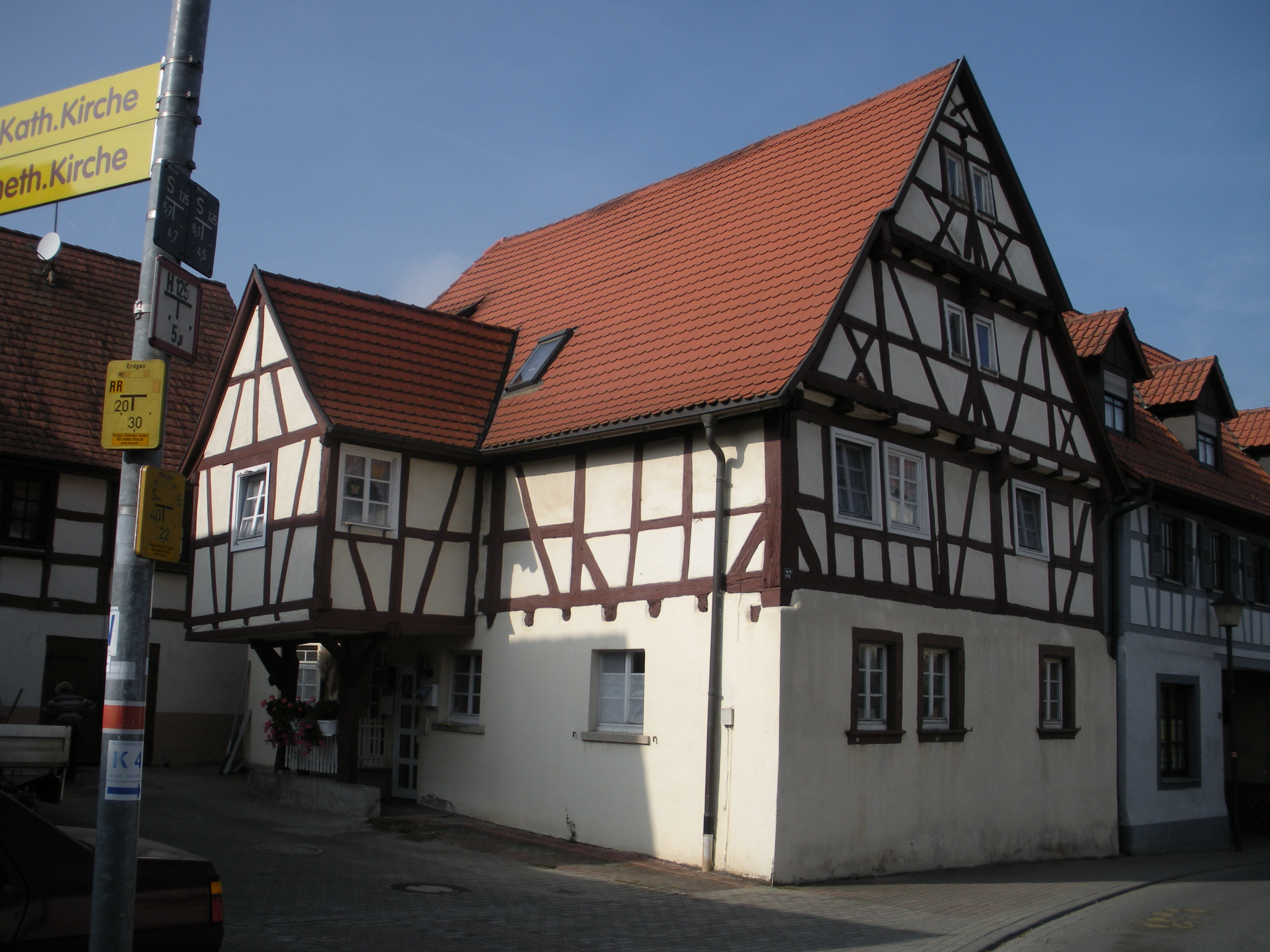
Old half-timbered house in Münzesheim

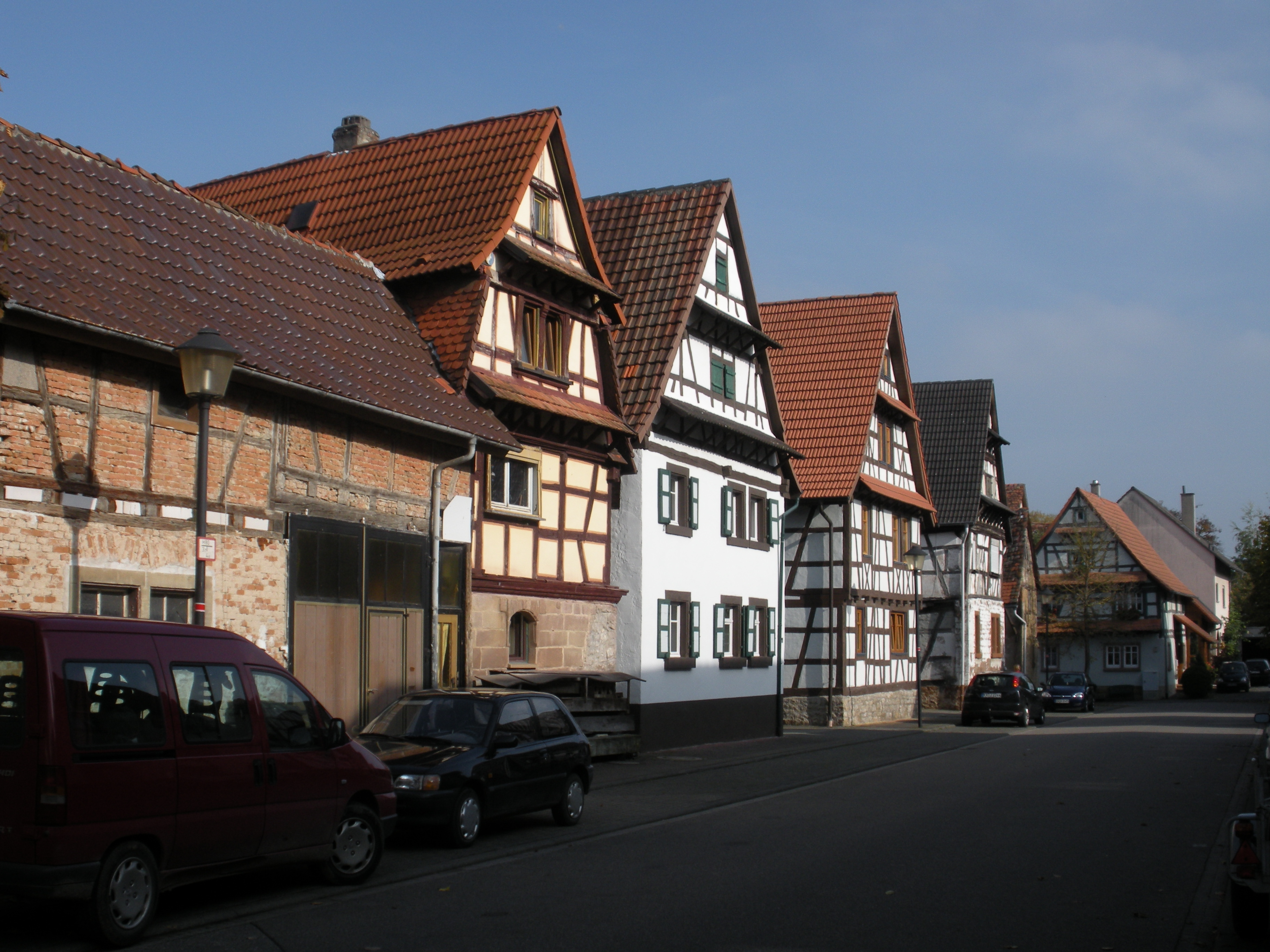
Half-timbered houses in Münzesheim

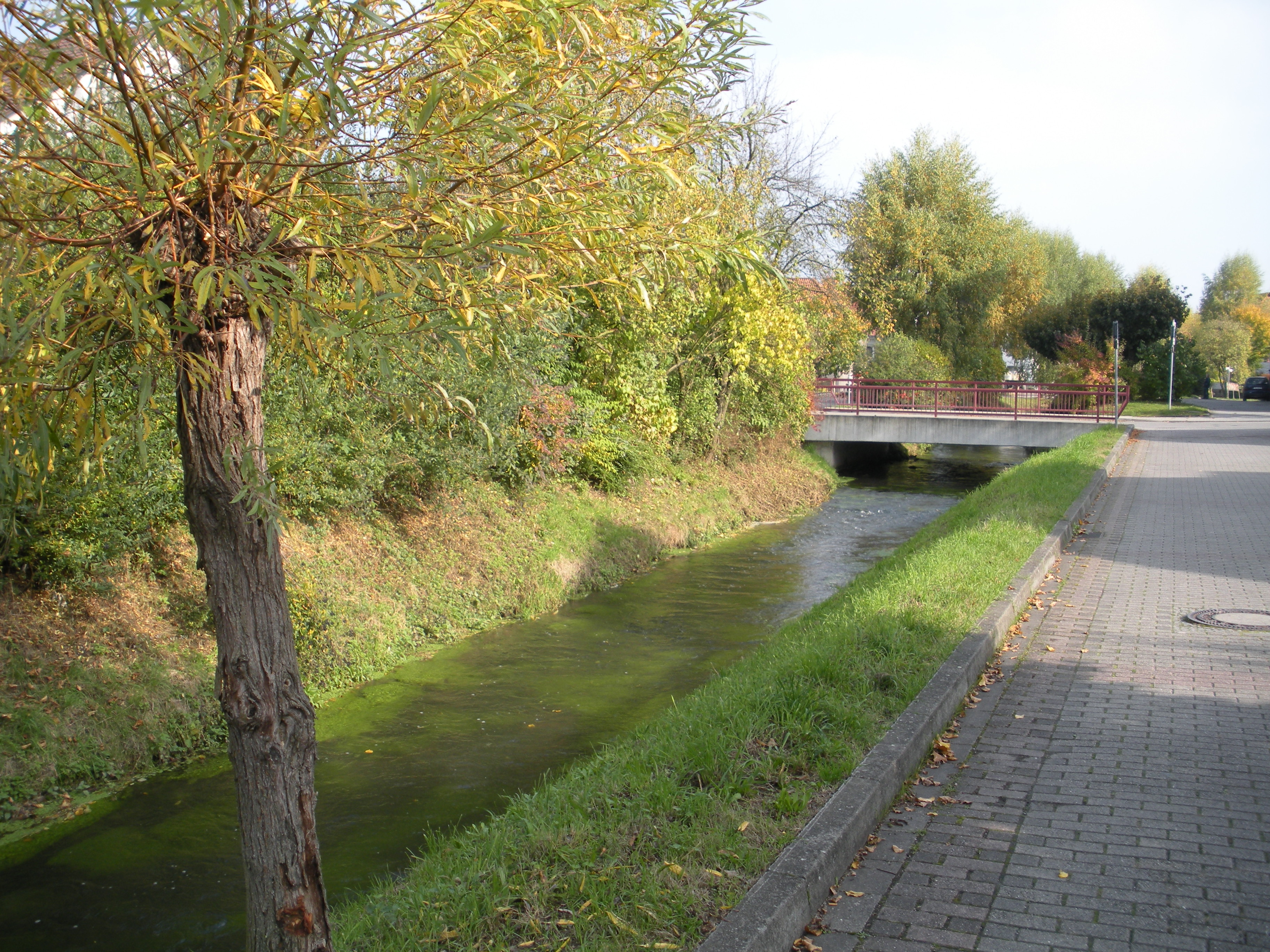
The river "Kraichbach" in Münzesheim

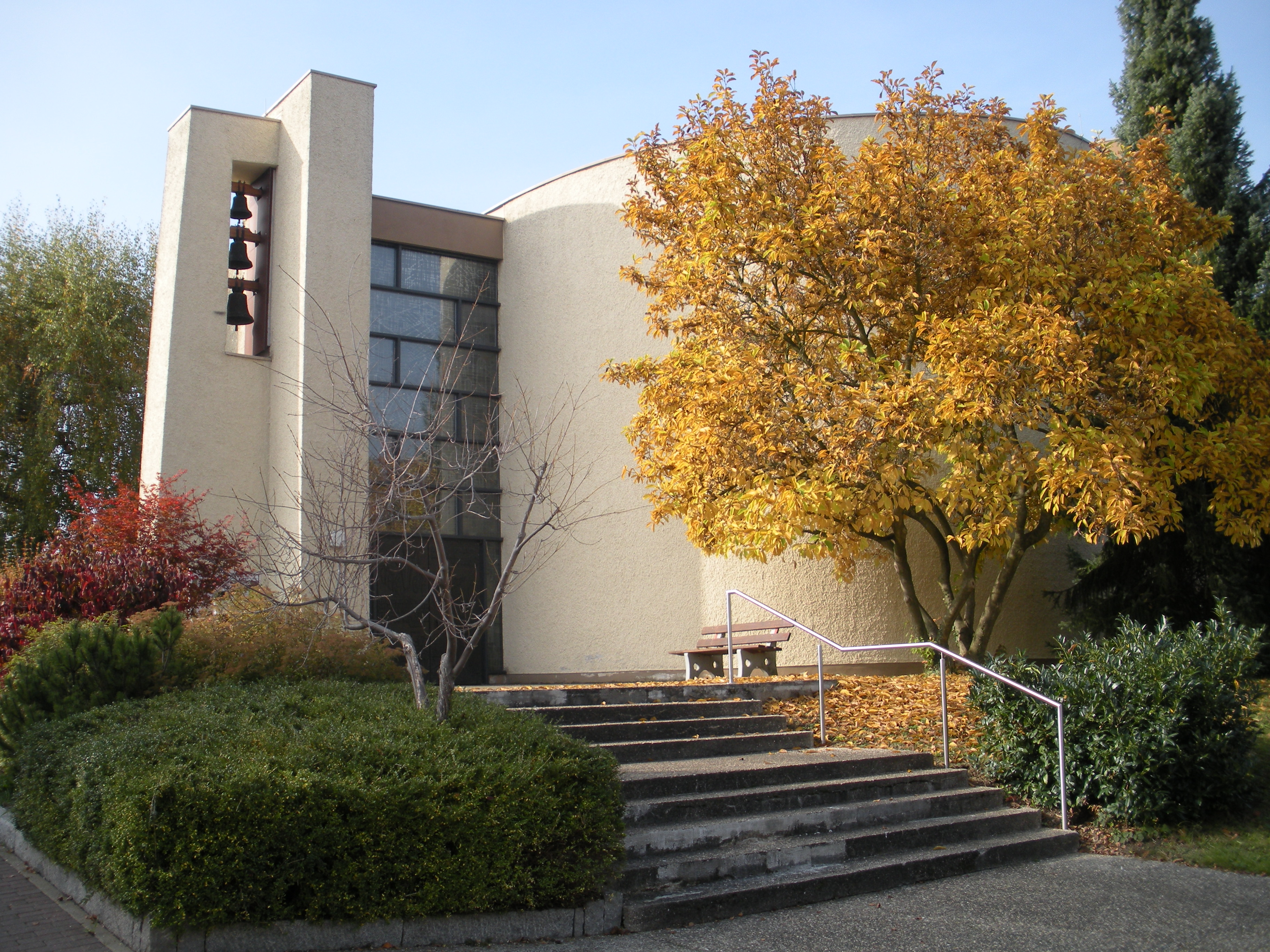
Catholic Church of St. Andrew

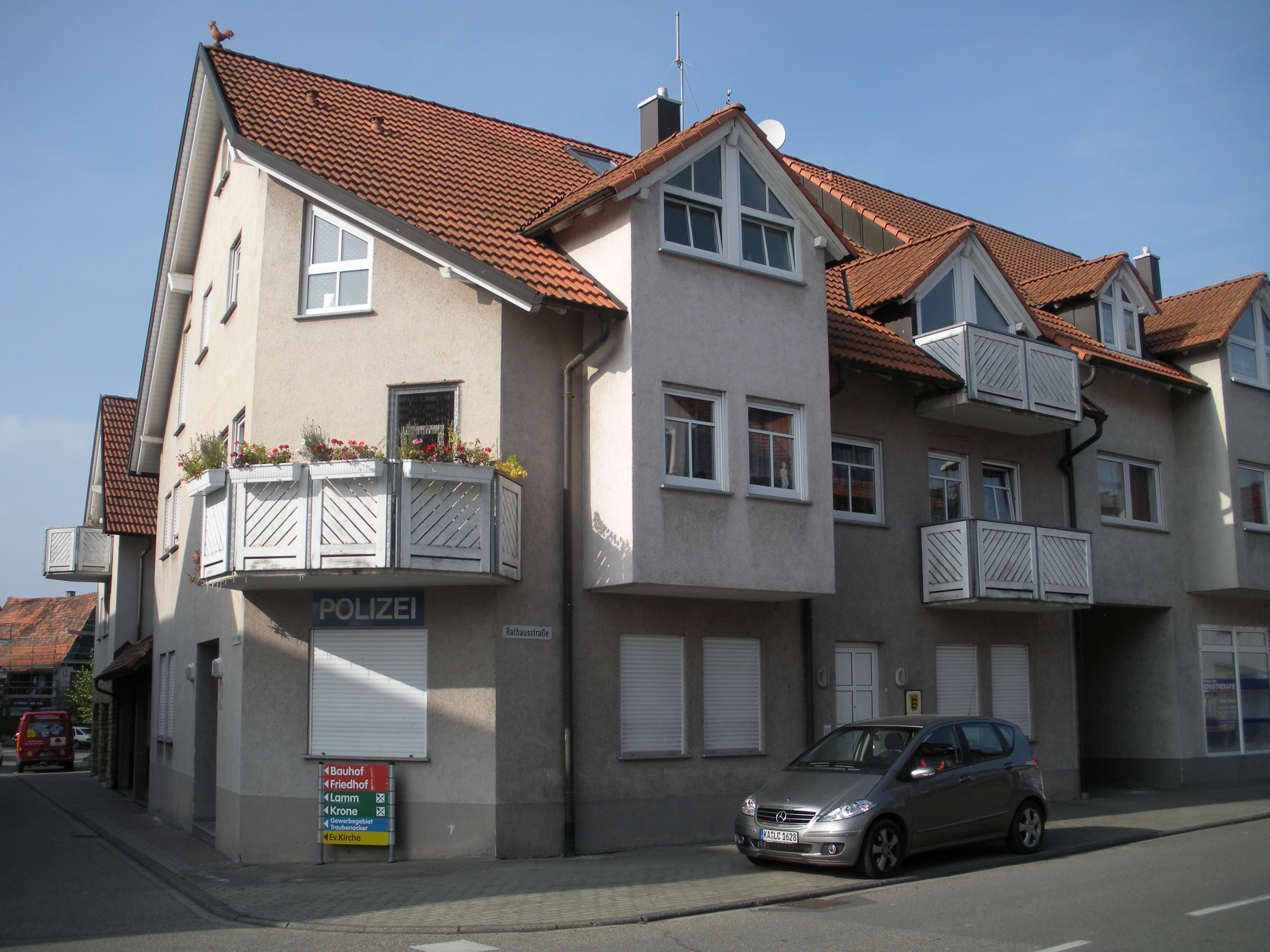
Police station in Kraichtal Münzesheim

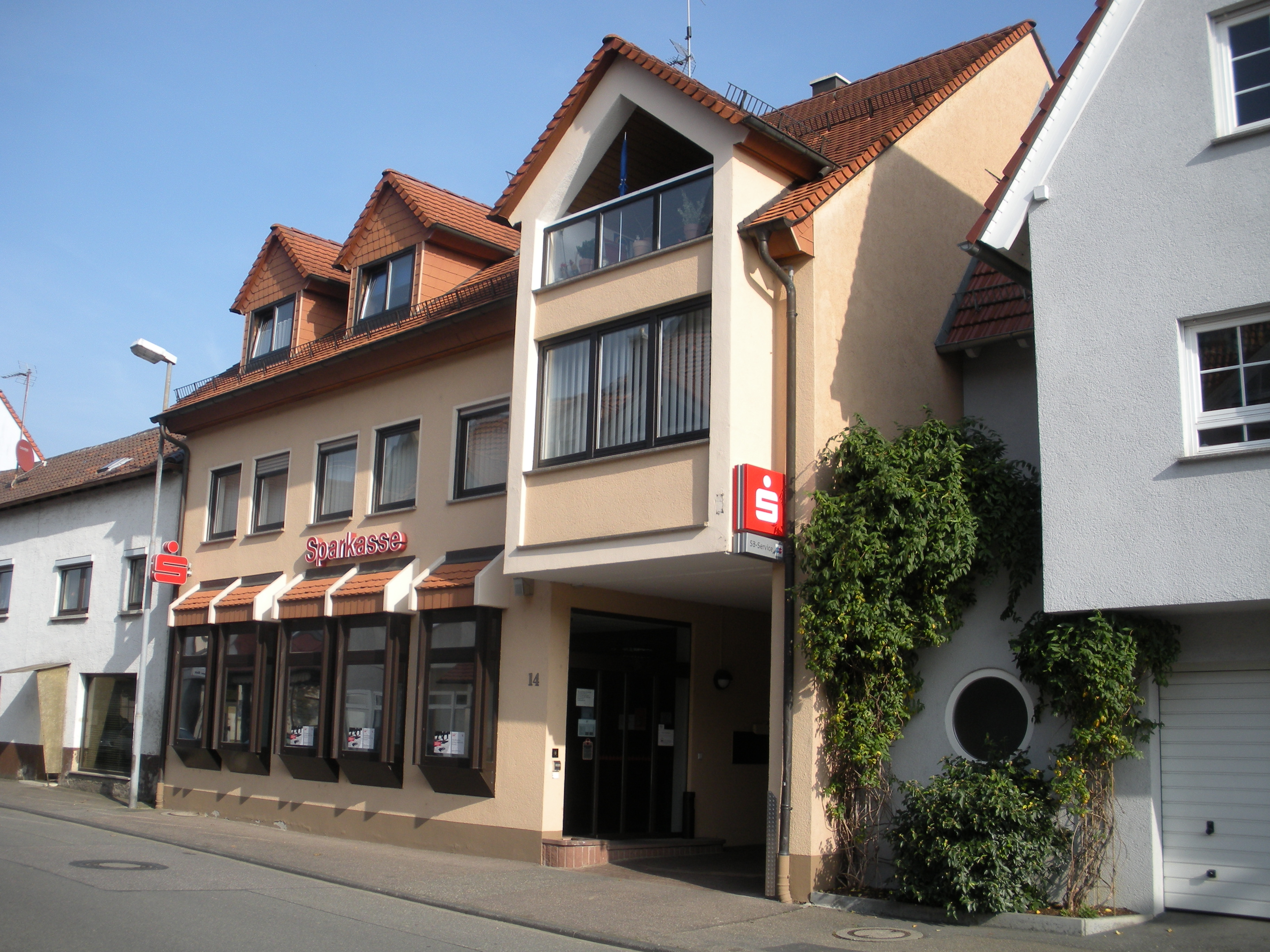
"Sparkasse Kraichgau" - Branch Münzesheim

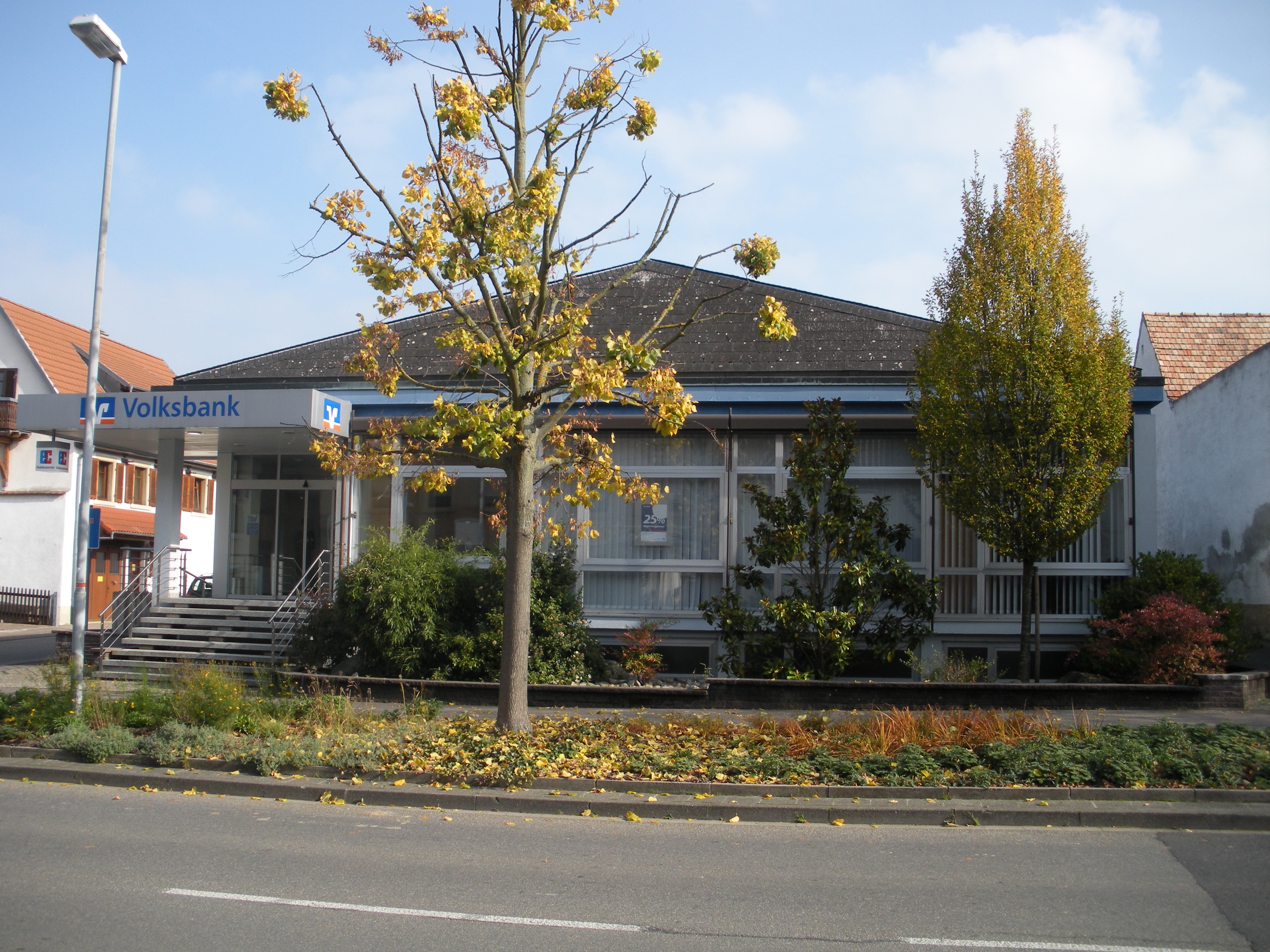
"Volksbank Bretten" - Branch Münzesheim

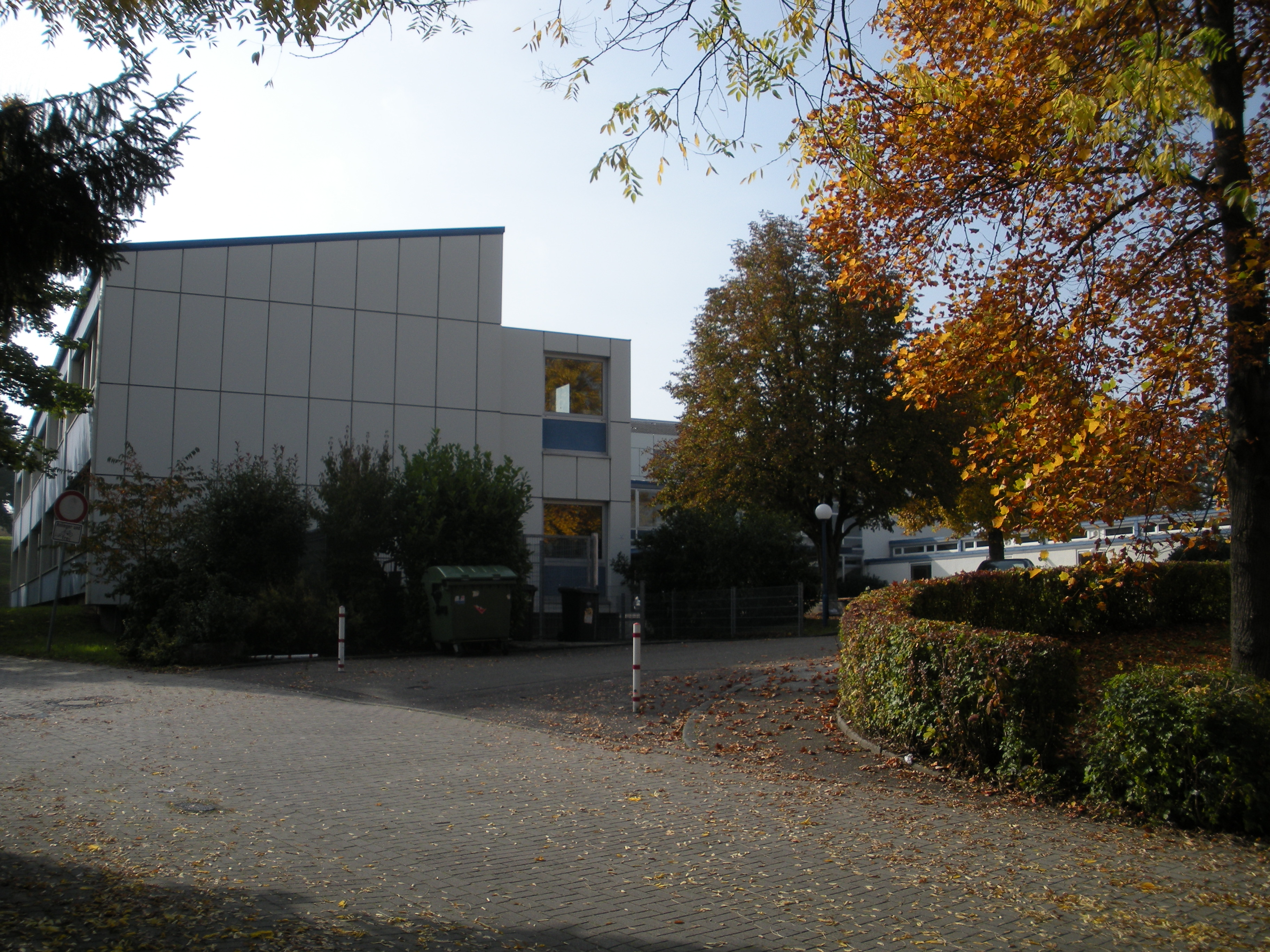
School "Markgrafenschule Münzesheim"

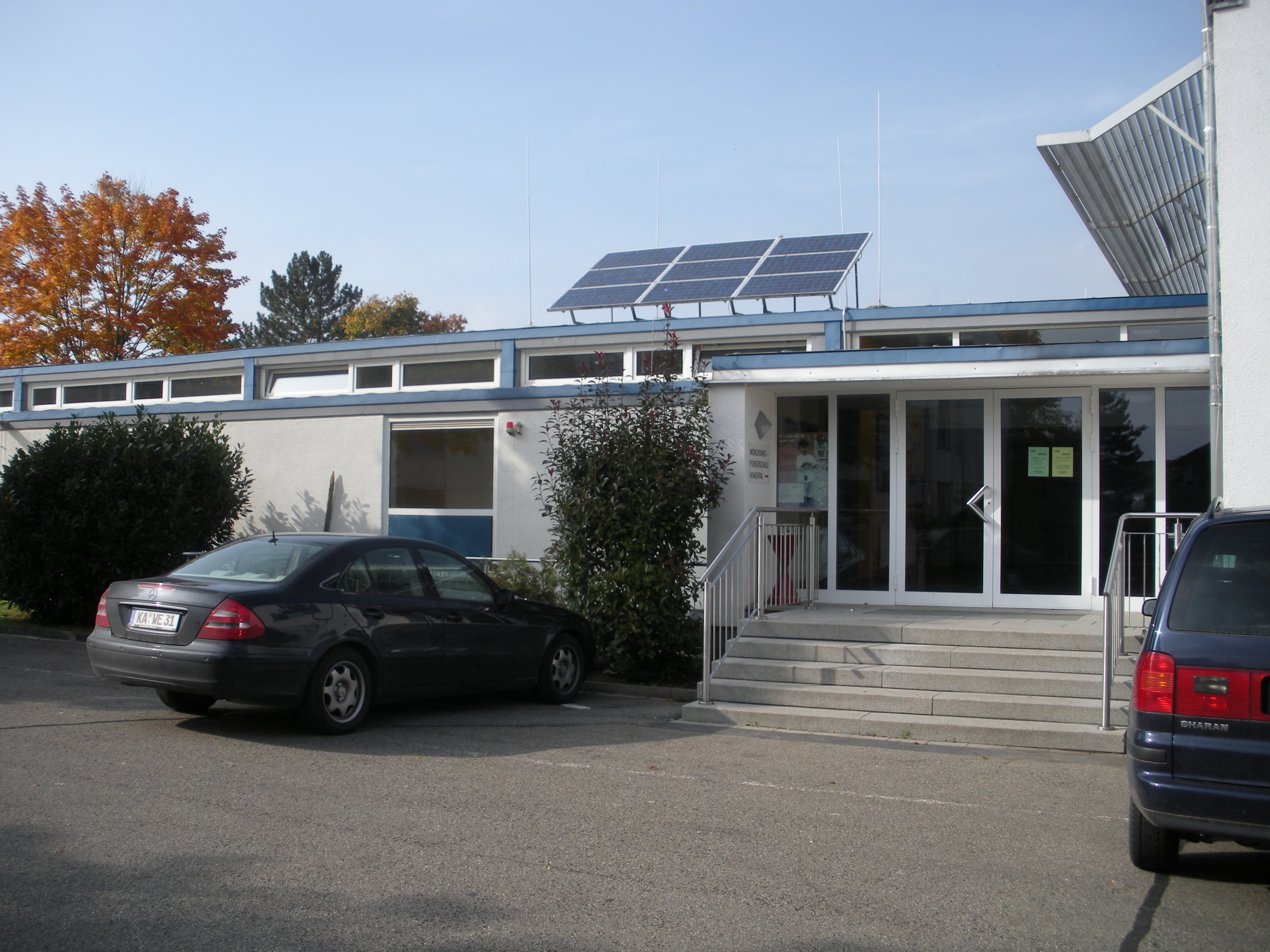
School "Mönchswegschule Münzesheim"

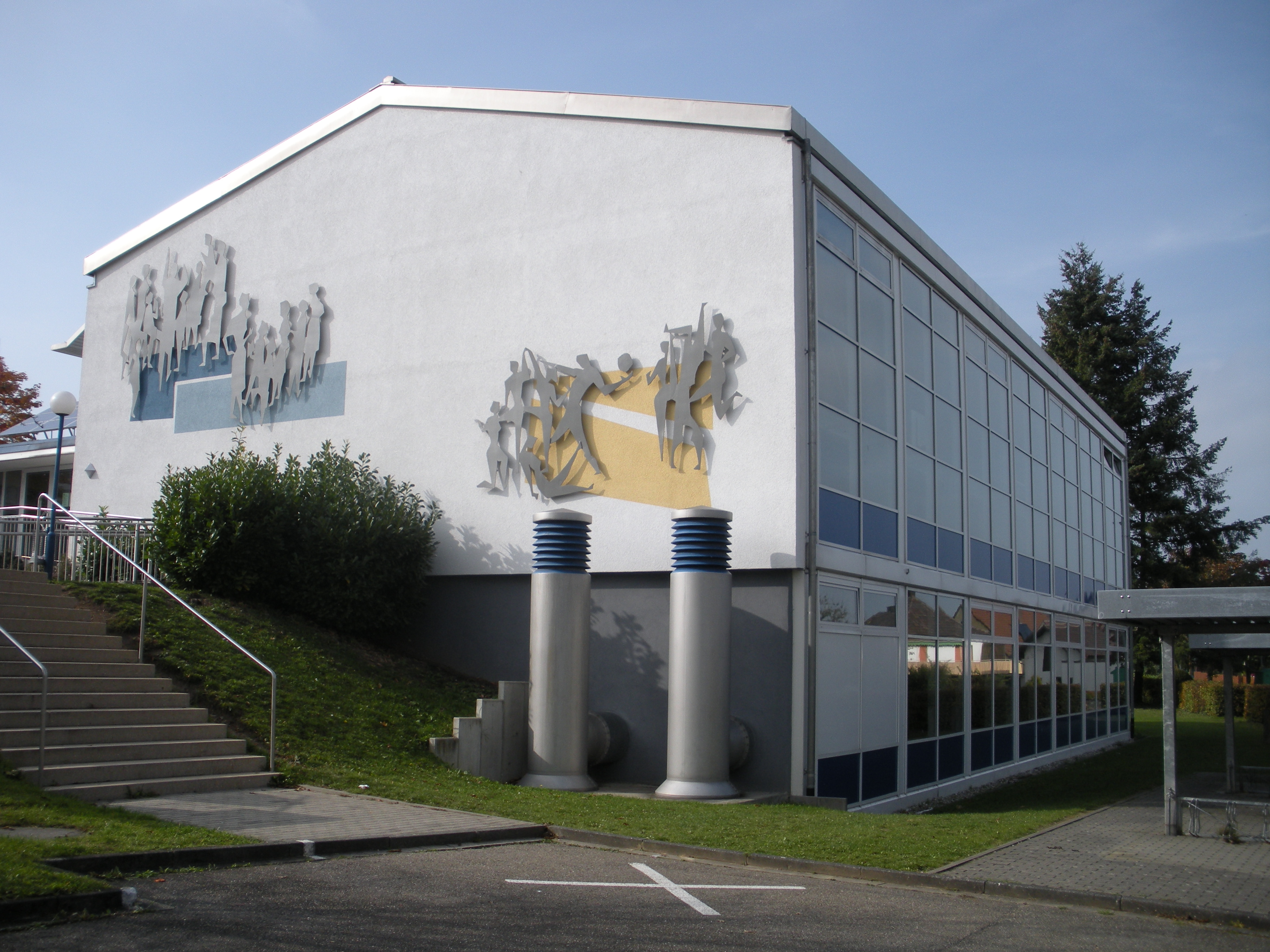
Gymnasium and swimming pool Münzesheim

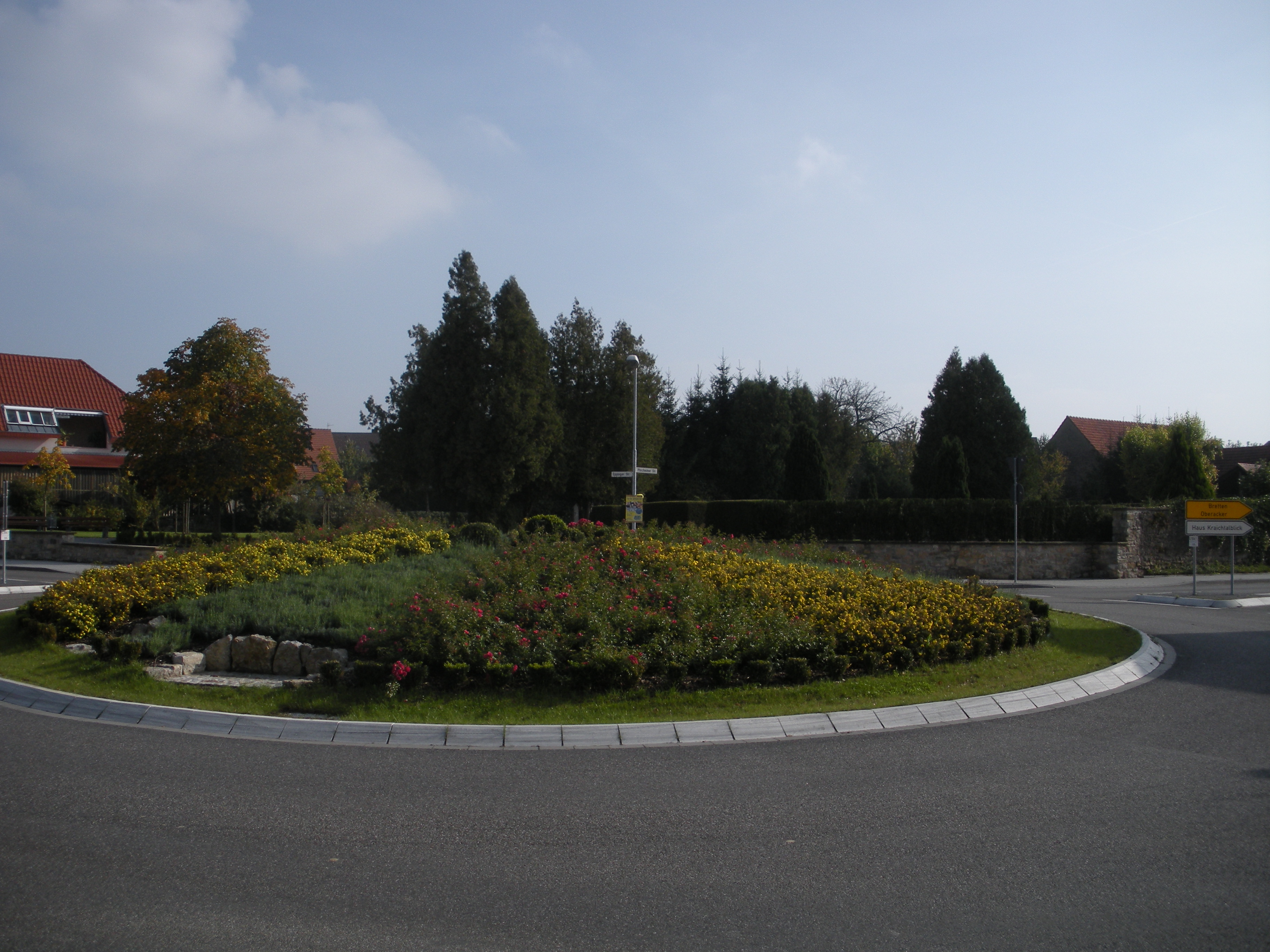
Roundabout with a view to the old cemetery Münzesheim

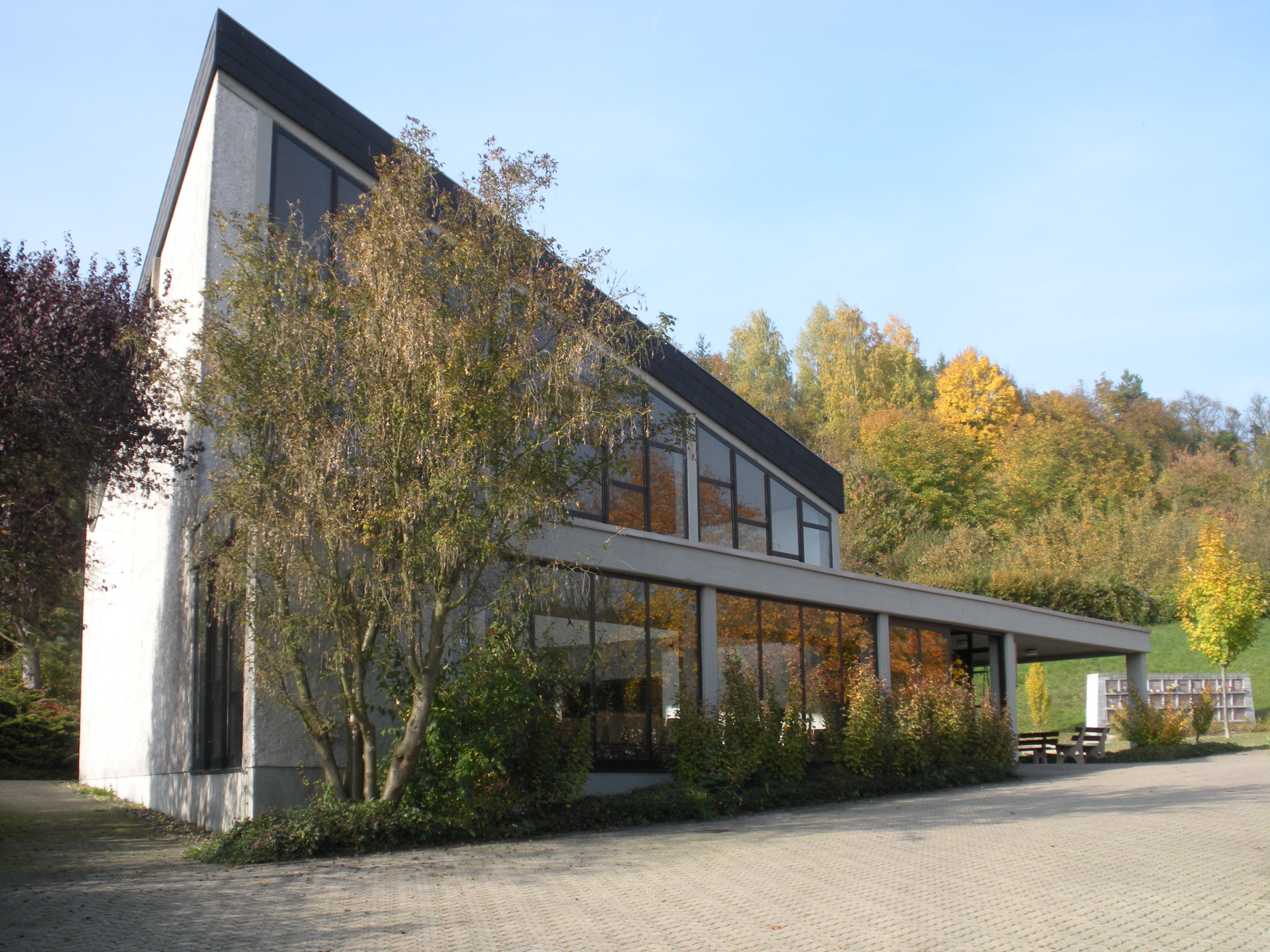
Funeral parlor to the new cemetery Münzesheim

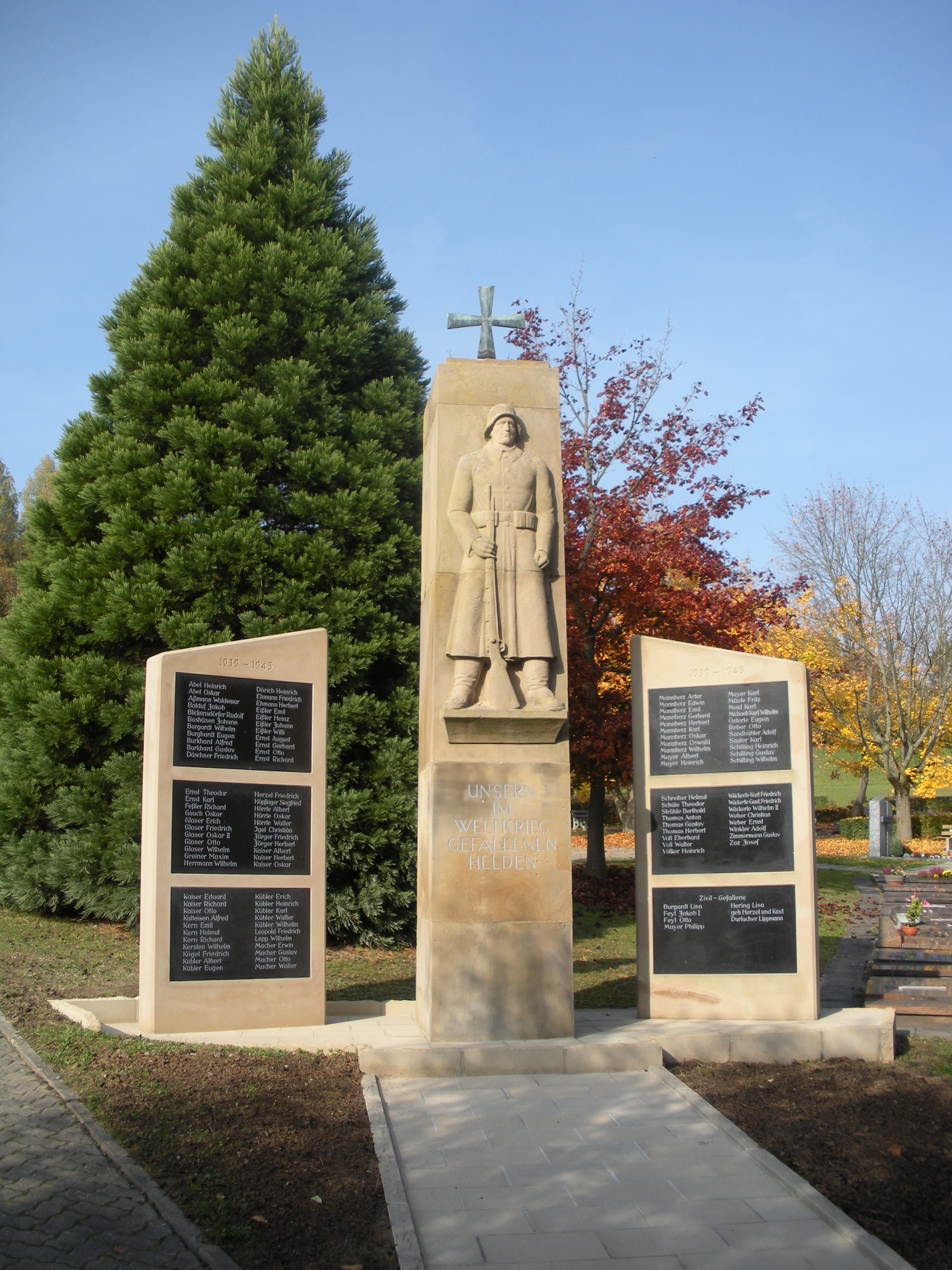
War memorial at the new cemetery Münzesheim

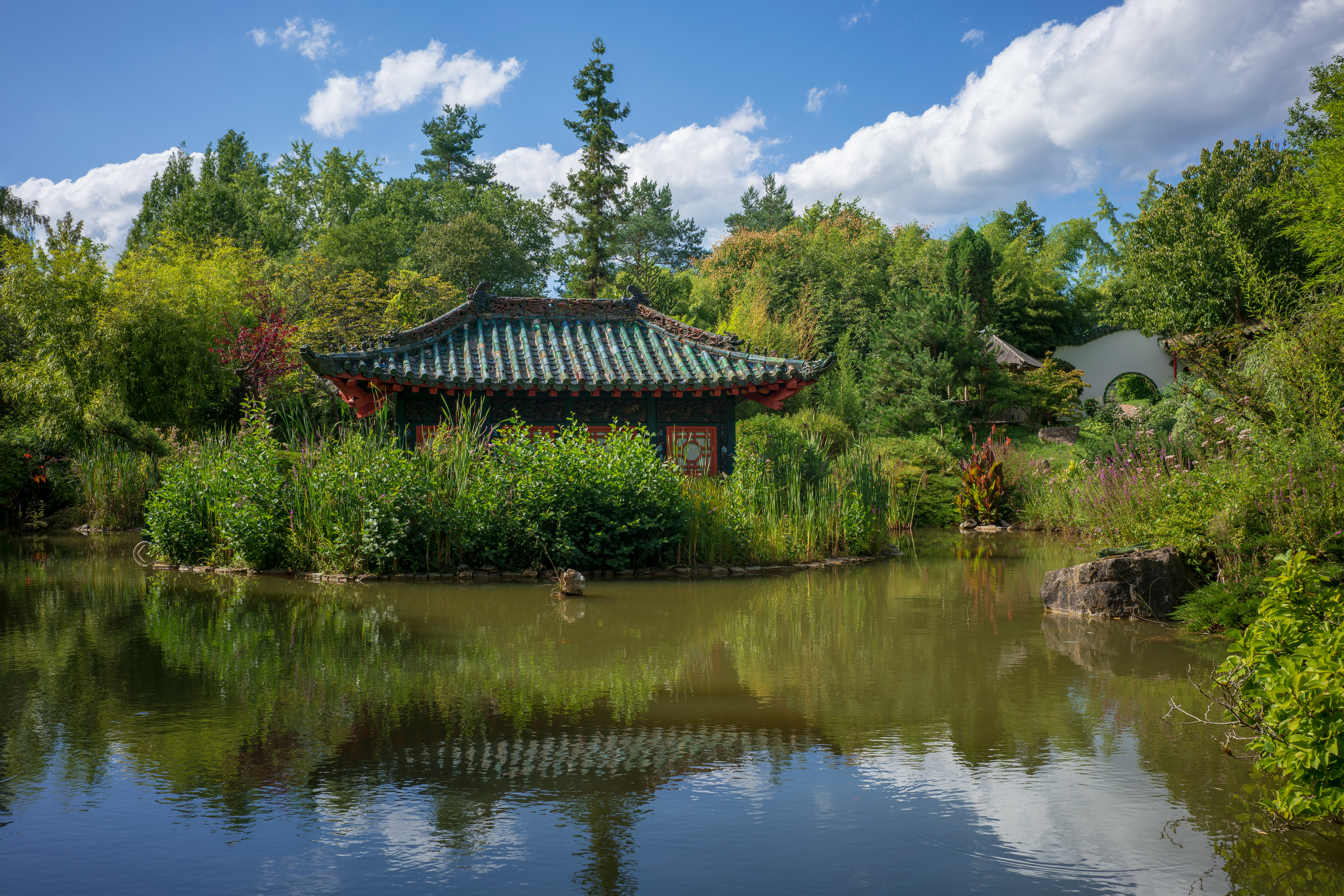
Asiatic garden
