= 2017 World Team Ninepin Bowling Classic Championships – Women's tournament =

Tournament details
- Host country: Germany
- City: Dettenheim
- Venue: 1 (in 1 host city)
- Dates: 20–27 May
- Teams: 14

Final positions
- Champions: Germany (6th title)
- Runners-up: Croatia
- Third place: Czech Republic; Slovenia

Tournament statistics
- Matches played: 25
- Top scorer: (Croatia) Ines Maričić 678

The women's tournament at the 2017 World Team Ninepin Bowling Classic Championships was held in Dettenheim, Germany from 20 to 27 May 2017.

The host Germany captured their sixth title by defeating Croatia in the final match after the first ever sudden victory (45-39). Bronze medals was secured by Czechia and Slovenia.

== Participating teams ==
- Austria
- Bosnia and Herzegovina
- Croatia
- Czech Republic
- Denmark
- Estonia
- France
- Germany
- Hungary
- Italy
- Romania
- Serbia
- Slovakia
- Slovenia

=== Draw ===
Pot 1	Pot 2	Pot 3	Pot 4
Croatia; Germany (hosts); Slovenia; Czech Republic	Hungary; Serbia; Romania; Italy	Austria; Slovakia; Bosnia and Herzegovina; France	Montenegro; Denmark; Estonia; Poland

=== Groups ===
Group A	Group B	Group C	Group D
Slovenia; Romania; Slovakia; Denmark	Croatia; Serbia; France; ~~Poland~~ (Note: The women's national team of Poland withdrew from participation in the championships. For this reason, only three teams were in group B. The third matches of each teams in the group stage were played with local players, but they did not count towards classification.)	Czech Republic; Italy; Bosnia and Herzegovina; ~~Montenegro~~ (Note: The Montenegro withdrew from participation in the championships. For this reason, only three teams were in group C. The third matches of each teams in the group stage were played with local players, but they did not count towards classification.)	Germany (hosts); Hungary; Austria; Estonia

== Group stage ==
=== Group A ===
		Pts	Matches			Team points		Set points		Qualification
Rank	Team	Pts	W	D	L	W	L	W	L	Qualification
1	Slovenia	6	3	0	0	20	4	50.5	21.5	Advance to quarterfinals
2	Slovakia	4	2	0	1	13	11	36.5	35.5	Advance to quarterfinals
3	Romania	2	1	0	2	12	12	45	27	
4	Denmark	0	0	0	3	3	21	12	60	

20 May 2017
15:00 CEST

Romania	3 - 5	Slovakia
3425 12.5	Report	11.5 3447
Cristina-Alexandra Samson 561 1.5		2.5 575 Gabriela Kuchárová
Nicoleta Steluta Trifan 552 2.0		2.0 571 Katarina Ďurčeková
Nina Raileanu 612 3.0		1.0 578 Katarína Valigurová
Anna Gyeresi 558 1.0		3.0 600 Klaudia Pivková
Daniela Lacatusu 544 2.0		2.0 538 Mária Tomková
Luminita Viorica Dogaru 598 3.0		1.0 585 Dana Klubertová

Liedolsheim Sport Hall, Dettenheim
Head referee: Hans Jesenko (AUT)

20 May 2017
18:30 CEST

Slovenia	7 - 1	Denmark
3517 21.0	Report	3.0 3176
Eva Sajko 557 2.0		2.0 572 Helle Soskkov
Anja Kozmus 604 4.0		0.0 502 Mette Jensen
Barbara Fidel 623 4.0		0.0 532 Heidi Poulsen
Rada Savič 566 4.0		0.0 526 Annia Johnna Alm
( (substituted on) 61 Irena Mejač) Brigita Strelec 573 3.0		1.0 536 Hellene Host Jensen
( (substituted on) 61 Petra Bašek) Nada Savič 594 4.0		0.0 508 Linda Holst Bille

Liedolsheim Sport Hall, Dettenheim
Head referee: Hans Jesenko (AUT)

22 May 2017
08:00 CEST

Slovakia	1 - 7	Slovenia
3483 6.0	Report	18.0 3694
Katarina Ďurčeková 577 1.0		3.0 619 Barbara Fidel
Katarína Valigurová 648 3.0		1.0 610 Anja Kozmus
Kristína Diabelková 572 1.0		3.0 602 Eva Sajko
Gabriela Kuchárová 572 0.0		4.0 615 Rada Savič
Klaudia Pivková 564 0.0		4.0 625 Brigita Strelec
( (substituted on) 91 Lenka Klimková) Dana Klubertová 550 1.0		3.0 623 Nada Savič

Liedolsheim Sport Hall, Dettenheim
Head referee: Hans Jesenko (AUT)

22 May 2017
11:30 CEST

Denmark	1 - 7	Romania
3134 4.0	Report	20.0 3501
Helle Soskov 556 1.0		3.0 616 Cristina-Alexadnra Samson
Heidi Poulsen 580 2.0		2.0 576 Nine Raileanu
Anni Johnna Malm 532 1.0		3.0 569 Nicoleta Steluta
( (substituted on) 61 Mette Jensen) Ena Emma Bargholz 471 0.0		4.0 556 Daniela Lacatusu ( (substituted on) 61 Andrea Mioara Baicoianu)
( (substituted on) 61 Marita Geinitz) Hellene Holst Jensen 487 0.0		4.0 588 Anna Gyeresi
Linda Holst Bille 0.0 507		4.0 596 Luminita Viorica Dogaru

Liedolsheim Sport Hall, Dettenheim
Head referee: Hans Jesenko (AUT)

24 May 2017
15:00 CEST

Slovakia	7 - 1	Denmark
3477 19.0	Report	5.0 3116
Lenka Klimková 536 2.0		2.0 539 Helle Soskov
Mária Tomková 560 2.0		2.0 535 Heidi Poulsen
Dagmar Kyselicová 575 3.0		1.0 526 Anni Johnna Malm
Kristína Diabelková 555 4.0		1.0 511 Helene Holst Jensen
Klaudia Pivková 615 4.0		0.0 528 Ena Emma Bargholz
Dana Klubertová 636 4.0		0.0 477 Mette Jensen

Liedolsheim Sport Hall, Dettenheim
Head referee: Hans Jesenko (AUT)

24 May 2017
18:30 CEST

Slovakia	6 - 2	Romania
3556 11.5	Report	12.5 3527
Barbara Fidel 611 ..0		2.0 585 Cristina-Alexandra Samson
Anja Kozmus 578 3.0		1.0 588 Nina Raileanu
Eva Sajko 573 2.5		1.5 543 Nicoleta Steluta Trifan
Rada Savič 592 0.0		4.0 610 Daniela Lacatusu
Brigita Strelec 604 4.0		0.0 566 Anna Gyeresi
( (substituted on) 91 Patricija Bizjak) Nada Savič 600 0.0		4.0 635 Luminita Viorica Dogaru

Liedolsheim Sport Hall, Dettenheim
Head referee: Hans Jesenko (AUT)

=== Group B ===
		Pts	Matches			Team points		Set points		Qualification
Rank	Team	Pts	W	D	L	W	L	W	L	Qualification
1	Croatia	4	2	0	0	14.0	2	32.5	15.5	Advance to quarterfinals
2	Serbia	2	1	0	1	9.0	7	24.5	23.5	Advance to quarterfinals
3	France	0	0	0	2	1.0	15	15.0	33	

20 May 2017
15:00 CEST

Serbia	8 - 0	France
3514 16.0	Report	8.0 3303
Kristina Ljubenković 589 3.0		1.0 529 Gwennealle Adler
Maja Đukić 598 2.0		2.0 573 Aurélie Remy
Renata Vilov 574 3.0		1.0 547 Marjolaine Guillemin
Olivera Čikoš 593 3.0		1.0 564 Magaly Simon
( (substituted on) 61 Vesna Boškov) Zorica Barać 569 2.0		2.0 560 Margot Gribelin
( (substituted on) 61 Hermina Lukač) Marijana Oros 591 3.0		1.0 530 Amélie Zind

Liedolsheim Sport Hall, Dettenheim
Head referee: Hans Jesenko (AUT)

22 May 2017
08:00 CEST

France	1 - 7	Croatia
3390 7.0	Report	17.0 3658
Margot Gribelin 568 1.0		3.0 621 Ana Bacan
Rachel Simon 533 0.0		4.0 666 Ana Jambrović
Amélie Zind 560 2.0		2.0 577 Iva Cindrić ( (substituted on) 61 Marijana Liović)
Marjolaine Guillemin 542 1.0		3.0 572 Tamara Sinković ( (substituted on) 61 Klara Sedlar)
Aurélie Remy 624 2.0		2.0 623 Ines Maričić
Magaly Simon 563 1.0		3.0 599 Nataša Ravnić-Gašparini

Liedolsheim Sport Hall, Dettenheim
Head referee: Hans Jesenko (AUT)

24 May 2017
18:00 CEST

Croatia	7 - 1	Serbia
3743 15.5	Report	8.5 3549
Marijana Liović 639 3.5		0.5 599 Zorica Barać
Klara Sedlar 643 3.0		1.0 564 Renata Vilov
Ana Bacan 595 2.0		2.0 570 Kristina Ljubenković
( (substituted on) 61 Tihana Čavlović) Ana Jambrović 569 1.0		3.0 639 Maja Đukić
Nataša Ravnić-Gašparini 631 2.0		2.0 614 Hermina Lukač
Ines Maričić 666 4.0		0.0 563 Olivera Čikoš ( (substituted on) 61 Marijana Oros)

Liedolsheim Sport Hall, Dettenheim
Head referee: Hans Jesenko (AUT)

=== Group C ===
		Pts	Matches			Team points		Set points		Qualification
Rank	Team	Pts	W	D	L	W	L	W	L	Qualification
1	Czech Republic	4	2	0	0	15.0	1	36.0	12	Advance to quarterfinals
2	Italy	2	1	0	1	6.0	10	18.0	30	Advance to quarterfinals
3	Bosnia and Herzegovina	0	0	0	2	3.0	13	18.0	30	

20 May 2017
08:00 CEST

Italy	6 - 2	Bosnia and Herzegovina
3289 14.0	Report	10.0 3248
Marion Thaler 554 1.0		3.0 567 Tatjana Zlojutro
Dagmar Wiedenhofer 551 2.0		2.0 548 Dragana Lotina
Christine Innerhofer 551 2.0		2.0 549 Rešida Rahmanović
Laura Runggatscher 535 3.0		1.0 514 Maja Kovačević
Edith Pfattner 531 2.0		2.0 564 Sanja Majhen
Annemarie Innerhofer 567 4.0		0.0 506 Tatjana Perišić

Liedolsheim Sport Hall, Dettenheim
Head referee: Hans Jesenko (AUT)

22 May 2017
18:30 CEST

Bosnia and Herzegovina	1 - 7	Czech Republic
3420 8.0	Report	16.0 3621
Tatjana Zlojutro 584 2.0		2.0 604 Hana Wiedermannová
Sanja Majhen 594 0.0		4.0 636 Nikola Tatoušková
Rešida Rahmanović 550 1.0		3.0 591 Dana Wiedermannová
Tatjana Perišić 574 3.0		1.0 576 Veronika Petrov
Maja Kovačević 559 1.0		3.0 618 Renáta Navrkalová
Dragana Lotina 559 1.0		3.0 596 Alena Kantnerová

Liedolsheim Sport Hall, Dettenheim
Head referee: Hans Jesenko (AUT)

24 May 2017
11:30 CEST

Czech Republic	8 - 0	Italy
3560 20.0	Report	4.0 3324
Hana Wiedermannová 593 3.0		1.0 537 Annemarie Innerhofer
Naděžda Dobešová 609 4.0		0.0 569 Dagmar Wiedenhofer
Natálie Topičová 589 3.0		1.0 552 Christine Innerhofer
Olga Hejhalová 619 4.0		0.0 542 Heidi Hofer
Veronika Petrov 551 3.0		1.0 541 Stefanie Schölzhorn
( (substituted on) 61 Dana Wiedermannová) Renáta Navrkalová 599 3.0		1.0 583 Laura Runggatscher

Liedolsheim Sport Hall, Dettenheim
Head referee: Hans Jesenko (AUT)

=== Group D ===
		Pts	Matches			Team points		Set points		Qualification
Rank	Team	Pts	W	D	L	W	L	W	L	Qualification
1	Germany (H)	6	3	0	0	19.0	5	47.5	24.5	Advance to quarterfinals
2	Hungary	4	2	0	1	17.0	7	44.0	28	Advance to quarterfinals
3	Austria	2	1	0	2	10.0	14	30.5	41.5	
4	Estonia	0	0	0	3	2.0	22	22.0	50	

20 May 2017
08:00 CEST

Hungary	6 - 2	Austria
3571 17.0	Report	7.0 3433
Gabriella Rozsa-Drajko 582 3.0		1.0 554 Dominique Pumpler
Irén Nemes 581 3.0		1.0 572 Daniela Plamenig
Gabriela Nemes-Juhász 582 2.0		2.0 590 Julia Schweizer
Anita Sáfrány 578 2.0		2.0 580 Monika Lengauer
Júlia-Emese Airizer 631 3.0		1.0 612 Lisa Vsetecka
Anita Méhész 617 4.0		0.0 525 Nicole Plamenig ( (substituted on) 80 Nathalie Neubauer)

Liedolsheim Sport Hall, Dettenheim
Head referee: Hans Jesenko (AUT)

20 May 2017
11:30 CEST

Germany	8 - 0	Estonia
3638 20.0	Report	4.0 3288
Sina Beißer 652 3.0		1.0 564 Anu Pluum
Simone Schneider 583 3.0		1.0 538 Triinu Saetalu
Corinna Kastner 612 4.0		0.0 546 Gertrud Saetalu
Alina Dollheimer 599 3.0		1.0 559 Heret Ost
( (substituted on) 61 Saskia Barth) Daniela Kicker 586 3.5		0.5 559 Kaire Kalberg
( (substituted on) 61 Melina Zimmermann) Saskia Seitz 601 3.5		0.5 522 Kaidi Kirs

Liedolsheim Sport Hall, Dettenheim
Head referee: Hans Jesenko (AUT)

22 May 2017
15:00 CEST

Austria	2 - 6	Germany
3530 11.5	Report	12.5 3558
Daniela Plamenig 574 1.5		2.5 625 Sina Beißer
Monika Lengauer 591 2.0		2.0 611 Corinna Kastner
Lisa Vsetecka 579 2.0		2.0 600 Saskia Barth
Julia Schweizer 587 2.0		2.0 579 Alina Dollheimer
Martina Vegerbauer 628 3.0		1.0 547 Melina Zimmermann
Dominique Pumpler 571 1.0		3.0 596 Saskia Seitz

Liedolsheim Sport Hall, Dettenheim
Head referee: Hans Jesenko (AUT)

22 May 2017
18:30 CEST

Estonia	0 - 8	Hungary
3190 6.0	Report	18.0 3508
Kertu Rohumägi 496 0.0		4.0 581 Anita Hegedüs
Heret Ots 553 2.0		2.0 575 Anita Dallosné Takács
Kaire Kalberg 553 1.0		3.0 582 Edit Sass
Merle Rohumägi 455 0.0		4.0 596 Anita Sáfrány
Anu Pluum 552 1.0		3.0 591 Gabriella Nemes-Juhász ( (substituted on) 61 Irén Nemes)
Gertrud Saetalu 581 2.0		2.0 583 Gabriella Rozsa-Drajko ( (substituted on) 61 Júlia-Emese Airizer)

Liedolsheim Sport Hall, Dettenheim
Head referee: Hans Jesenko (AUT)

24 May 2017
08:00 CEST

Austria	6 - 2	Estonia
3425 12.0	Report	12.0 3390
Lisa Vsetecka 571 2.0		2.0 587 Kaire Kalberg
( (substituted on) 61 Monika Lengauer) Daniela Plamenig 556 2.0		2.0 547 Anu Pluum
Nicole Plamenig 575 2.0		2.0 539 Gertrud Saetalu
Monika Vegerbauer 588 2.0		2.0 597 Heret Ots
( (substituted on) 61 Dominique Pumpler) Nathalie Neubauer 553 2.0		2.0 546 Kertu Rohumägi
Julia Schweizer 582 2.0		2.0 574 Triinu Saetalu

Liedolsheim Sport Hall, Dettenheim
Head referee: Hans Jesenko (AUT)

24 May 2017
11:30 CEST

Germany	5 - 3	Hungary
3594 15.0	Report	9.0 3532
Alina Dollheimer 581 2.0		2.0 600 Anita Sáfrány
Sina Beißer 609 4.0		0.0 548 ( (substituted on) 61 Edit Sass Gabriella) Rozsa-Drajko
Saskia Barth 569 2.0		2.0 591 Gabriella Nemes-Juhász
Simone Schneider 588 1.0		3.0 628 Irén Nemes
Saskia Seitz 630 4.0		0.0 565 Anita Méhész
Corinna Kastner 617 2.0		2.0 604 Júlia-Emese Airizer

Liedolsheim Sport Hall, Dettenheim
Head referee: Hans Jesenko (AUT)

== Final Round ==
=== Bracket ===
Quarterfinals
1A	Slovenia	8
2C	Italy	0
1B	Croatia	6
2D	Hungary	2
1C	Czech Republic	5
2A	Slovakia	3
1D	Germany	5
2B	Serbia	3

Semifinals
Slovenia	3
Croatia	5
Czech Republic	3
Germany	5

Final
Croatia	4	39
Germany	4	45

=== Quarterfinals ===
26 May 2017
08:00 CEST

Slovenia	8 - 0	Italy
3625 19.0	Report	5.0 3269
Barbara Fidel 627 3.0		1.0 544 Marion Thaler
Anja Kozmus 597 3.0		1.0 543 Lura Runggatscher
Eva Sajko 642 4.0		0.0 579 Stefanie Schölzorn
Rada Savič 617 4.0		0.0 545 Annemarie Innerhofer ( (substituted on) 61 Edith Pfattner)
( (substituted on) 61 Irena Mejač) Brigita Strelec 588 3.0		1.0 506 Christine Innerhofer ( (substituted on) 61 Heidi Hofer)
( (substituted on) 61 Petra Bašek) Nada Savič 560 2.0		2.0 552 Dagmar Wiedenhofer

Liedolsheim Sport Hall, Dettenheim
Head referee: Hans Jesenko (AUT)

26 May 2017
11:30 CEST

Croatia	6 - 2	Hungary
3680 13.0	Report	11.0 3645
Marijana Liović 606 1.5		2.5 620 Gabriella Rozsa-Drajko
Ana Bacan 626 2.5		1.5 607 Anita Méhész
Ana Jambrović 639 3.0		1.0 585 Anita Sáfrány
( (substituted on) 116 Mirna Bosak) Klara Sedlar 510 0.0		4.0 636 Gabriella Nemes-Juhász ( (substituted on) 36 Anita Dallosné Takács)
Ines Maričić 678 4.0		0.0 608 Júlia-Emese Airizer
Nataša Ravnić-Gašparini 621 2.0		2.0 589 Iren Nemes

Liedolsheim Sport Hall, Dettenheim
Head referee: Hans Jesenko (AUT)

26 May 2017
15:00 CEST

Czech Republic	5 - 3	Slovakia
3567 15.0	Report	9.0 3478
Nikola Tatoušková 622 4.0		0.0 581 Dagmar Kyselicová
Hana Wiedermannová 579 2.0		2.0 586 Gabriela Kuchárová
Dana Wiedermannová 616 4.0		0.0 561 Katarina Ďurčeková
Olga Hejhalová 607 2.0		2.0 630 Katarína Valigurová
Renata Navrkalová 597 2.0		2.0 557 Kana Klubertová
Alena Kantnerová 546 1.0		3.0 563 Klaudia Pivková

Liedolsheim Sport Hall, Dettenheim
Head referee: Hans Jesenko (AUT)

26 May 2017
18:30 CEST

Germany	5 - 3	Serbia
3710 11.0	Report	13.0 3593
Corinna Kastner 638 2.0		2.0 582 Kristina Ljubenković
Sina Beißer 621 1.0		3.0 641 Maja Đukić
Simone Schneider 608 1.0		3.0 588 Hermina Lukač
Alina Dollheimer 598 2.5		1.5 545 Olivera Čikoš
Daniela Kicker 608 1.5		2.5 609 Zorica Barać
Saskia Seitz 637 3.0		1.0 628 Renata Vilov

Liedolsheim Sport Hall, Dettenheim
Head referee: Hans Jesenko (AUT)

=== Semifinals ===
27 May 2017
08:00 CEST

Slovenia	3 - 5	Croatia
3545 11.0	Report	13.0 3587
Barbara Fidel 584 1.0		3.0 618 Marijana Liović
Anja Kozmus 594 3.0		1.0 578 Klara Sedlar
Eva Sajko 598 3.0		1.0 570 Ana Bacan
Rada Savič 597 2.0		2.0 568 Ana Jambrović
Brigita Strelec 594 2.0		2.0 648 Ines Maričić
Nada Savič 578 0.0		4.0 604 Nataša Ravnić-Gašparini

Liedolsheim Sport Hall, Dettenheim
Head referee: Hans Jesenko (AUT)

25 May 2017
13:30 CEST

Czech Republic	3 - 5	Germany
3557 9.5	Report	14.5 3708
Naděžda Dobešová 598 1.0		3.0 644 Sina Beißer
Nikola Tatoušková 608 3.0		1.0 576 Alina Dollheimer
Dana Wiedermannová 583 3.0		1.0 585 Corinna Kastner
Olga Hejhalová 549 0.0		4.0 613 Simone Schneider
Renáta Navrkalová 629 2.0		2.0 626 Daniela Kicker
( (substituted on) 61 Natálie Topičová) Hana Wiedermannová 590 0.5		3.5 665 Saskia Seitz ( (substituted on) 91 Melina Zimmermann)

Liedolsheim Sport Hall, Dettenheim
Head referee: Hans Jesenko (AUT)

=== Final ===
27 May 2017
16:00 CEST

Croatia	4 - 4	Germany
3680 12,0	39 - 45 sv	12,0 3723
Mirna Bosak 586 1,0	Report	3,0 629 Sina Beißer
Marijana Liović 618 3,0		1,0 601 Simone Schneider
Klara Sedlar 590 1,0		3,0 658 Corinna Kastner
Ana Jambrović 601 2,0		2,0 590 Alina Dollheimer
Nataša Ravnić-Gasparini 610 2,0		2,0 596 Daniela Kicker
Ines Maričić 675 3,0		1,0 649 Saskia Seitz

Liedolsheim Sport Hall, Dettenheim
Head referee: Hans Jesenko (AUT)

== Final standing ==
Rank	Team
1st place, gold medalist(s)	Germany
2nd place, silver medalist(s)	Croatia
3rd place, bronze medalist(s)	Czech Republic
3rd place, bronze medalist(s)	Slovenia
5-8	Hungary
5-8	Italy
5-8	Serbia
5-8	Slovakia
9-12	Austria
9-12	Bosnia and Herzegovina
9-12	France
9-12	Romania
13-14	Denmark
13-14	Estonia
