= Sulzfeld =

Sulzfeld may refer to the following places in Germany:

- Sulzfeld, Baden-Württemberg, in the district of Karlsruhe
- Sulzfeld, Rhön-Grabfeld, in the district of Rhön-Grabfeld, Bavaria
- Sulzfeld am Main, in the district of Kitzingen, Bavaria
