= Kraichtal =

- Town
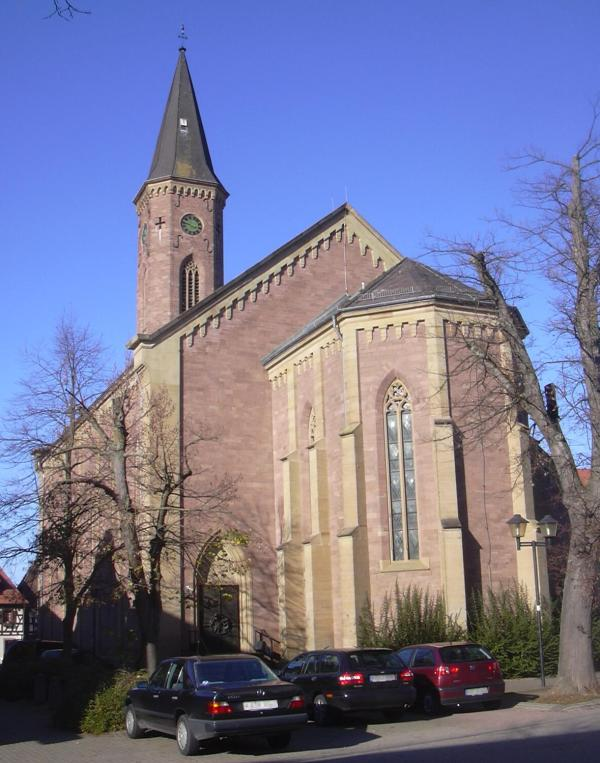
- Saint Martin's Chapel in Muenzesheim

- Coat of arms

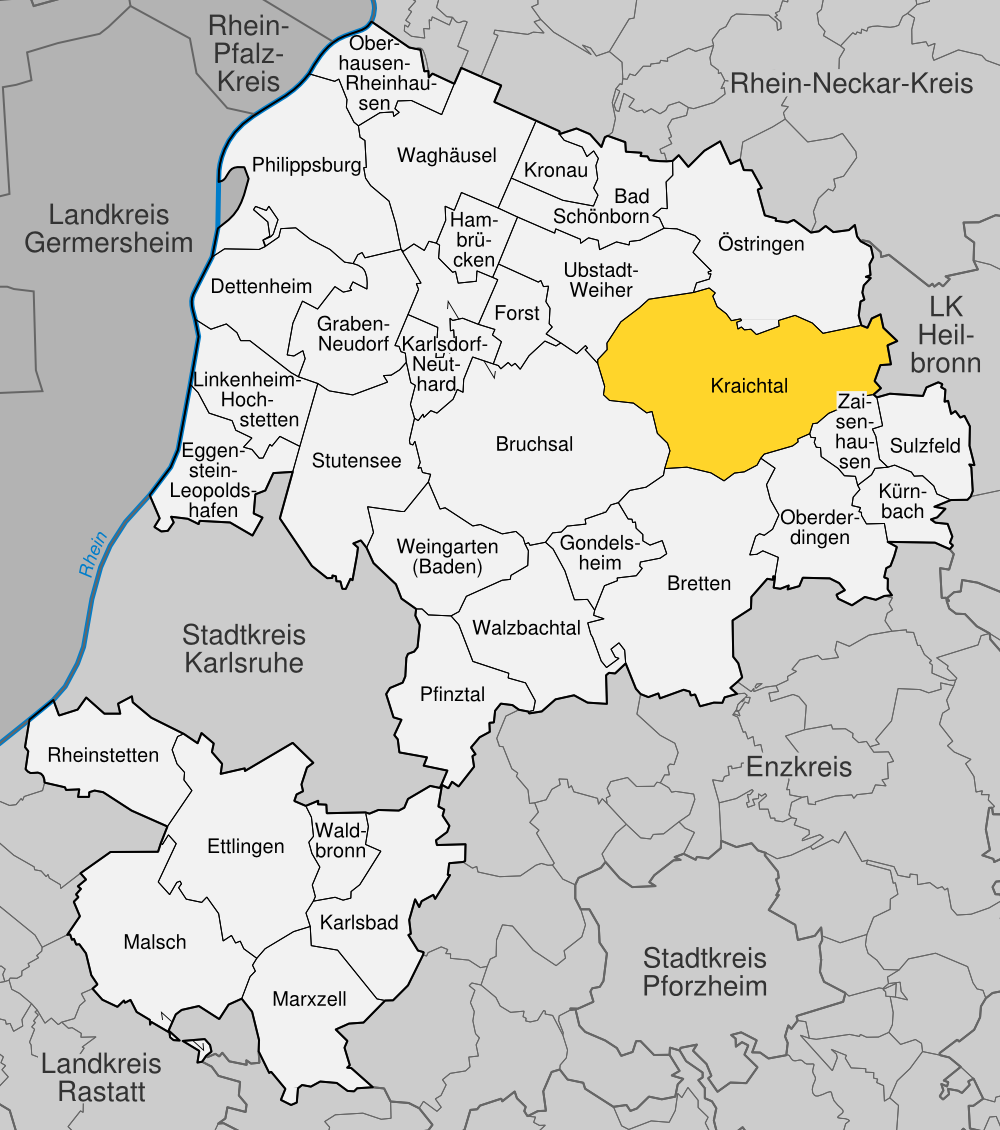
- Location of Kraichtal within Karlsruhe district
- Interactive map of Kraichtal
- Location within Germany Location within Baden-Württemberg
- Coordinates: 49°07′27″N 08°42′53″E
- Country: Germany
- State: Baden-Württemberg
- Admin. region: Karlsruhe
- District: Karlsruhe
- Subdivisions: 9

Government
  - Mayor (2021–29): Tobias Borho (SPD)

Area
  - Total: 80.59 km^{2} (31.12 sq mi)
- Elevation: 177 m (581 ft)

Population (2025-12-31)
  - Total: 14,546
  - Density: 180.5/km^{2} (467.5/sq mi)
- Time zone: UTC+01:00 (CET)
  - Summer (DST): UTC+02:00 (CEST)
- Postal codes: 76703
- Dialling codes: 07250, 07251, 07258, 07259
- Vehicle registration: KA
- Website: www.kraichtal.de

Kraichtal (German pronunciation: [ˈkʁaɪçtaːl], lit. 'Kraich Valley') is a town in the north-eastern part of the Karlsruhe district in Baden-Württemberg, Germany. It was founded in 1971 by a merger of nine smaller municipalities.

== Geography ==
Kraichtal is a town embedded in western Kraichgau, a hilly landscape between the Black Forest, Odenwald forest and the Neckar river. Kraichtal (literally Kraich Valley) got its name from the Kraich river, which flows through Kraichtal, and then eventually into the Rhine.

=== Neighbouring towns ===
The following towns neighbour Kraichtal: Eppingen and Zaisenhausen, Oberderdingen, Bretten, Bruchsal, Ubstadt-Weiher and Oestringen.

=== Districts ===
Kraichtal consists of nine districts, each district (Stadtteil) representing one of the nine municipalities which merged to become Kraichtal in 1971:

- Bahnbrücken
- Gochsheim (Baden)
- Landshausen
- Menzingen (Baden)
- Münzesheim
- Neuenbürg (Baden)
- Oberöwisheim
- Oberacker
- Unteröwisheim

Count Eberstein Castle lies in Gochsheim, in the north east of Kraichtal.

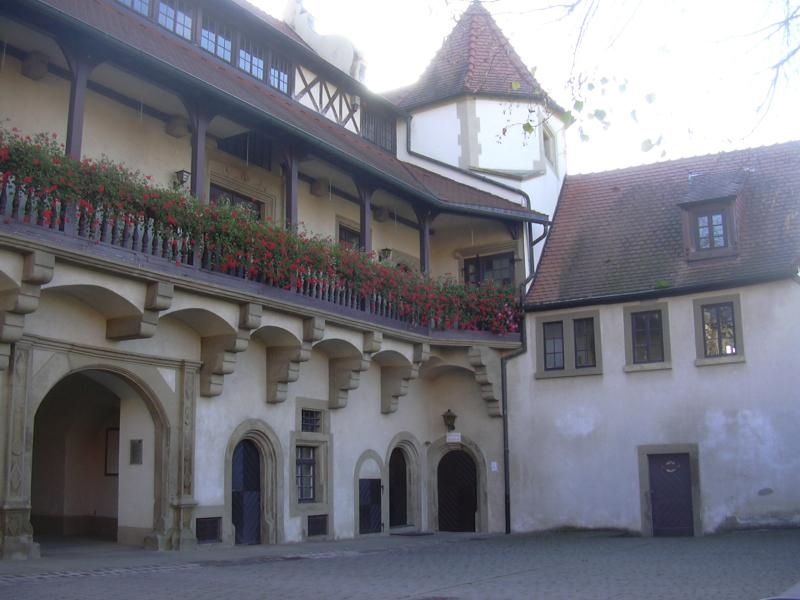
The inner courtyard of Count Eberstein Castle
