= Katzbach (Kraichbach) =

River in Germany

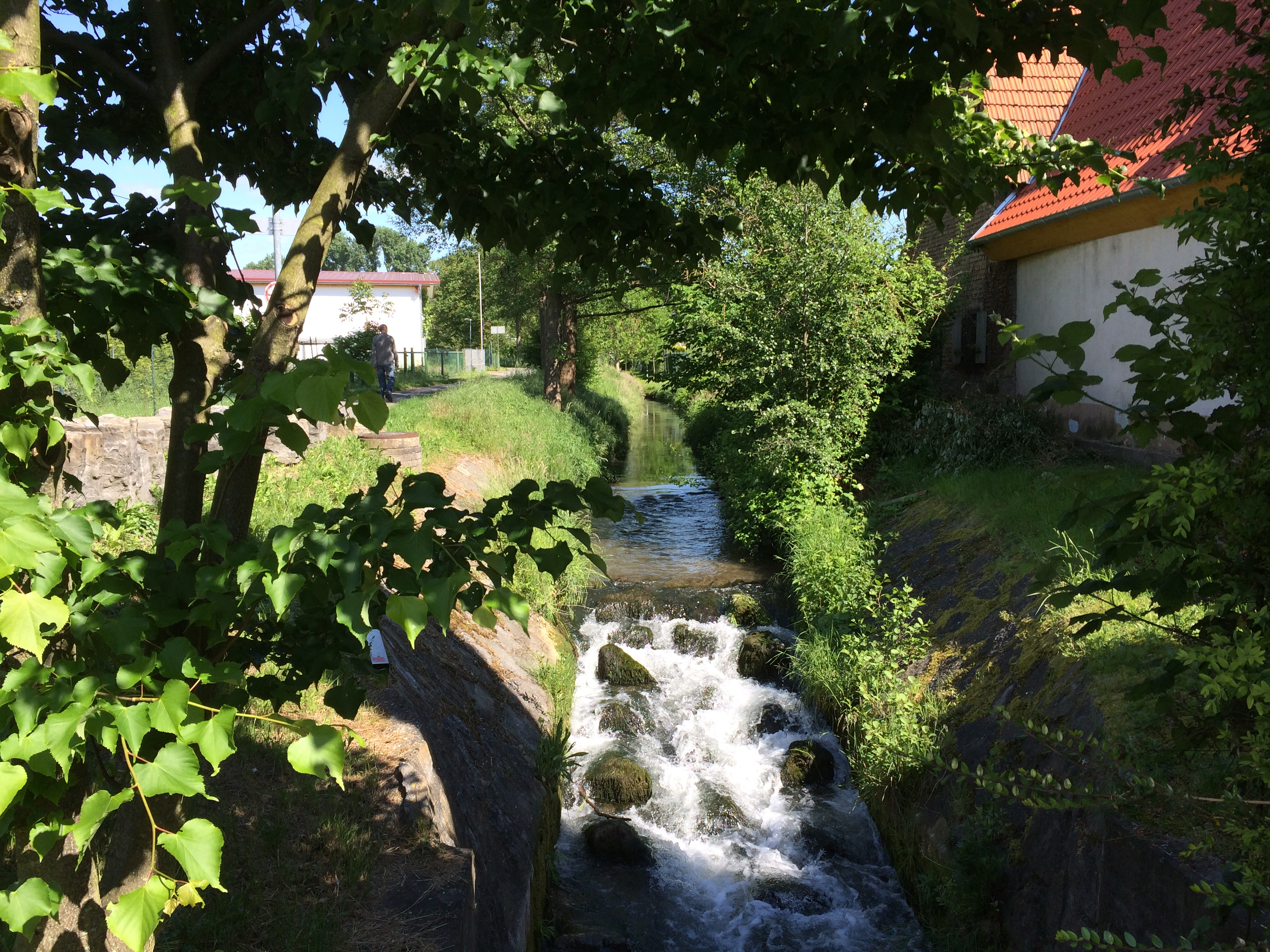

Location
- Country: Germany
- State: Baden-Württemberg

Physical characteristics
- Mouth
  - location: Kraichbach
  - coordinates: 49.1900°N 8.6321°E
- Length: 17.7 km (11.0 mi)

Basin features
- Progression: Kraichbach→ Rhine→ North Sea

Katzbach is a river of Baden-Württemberg, Germany. It flows into the Kraichbach near Ubstadt-Weiher.

== See also ==
- List of rivers of Baden-Württemberg
