= Ansgar Mayr =

German politician (born 1972)

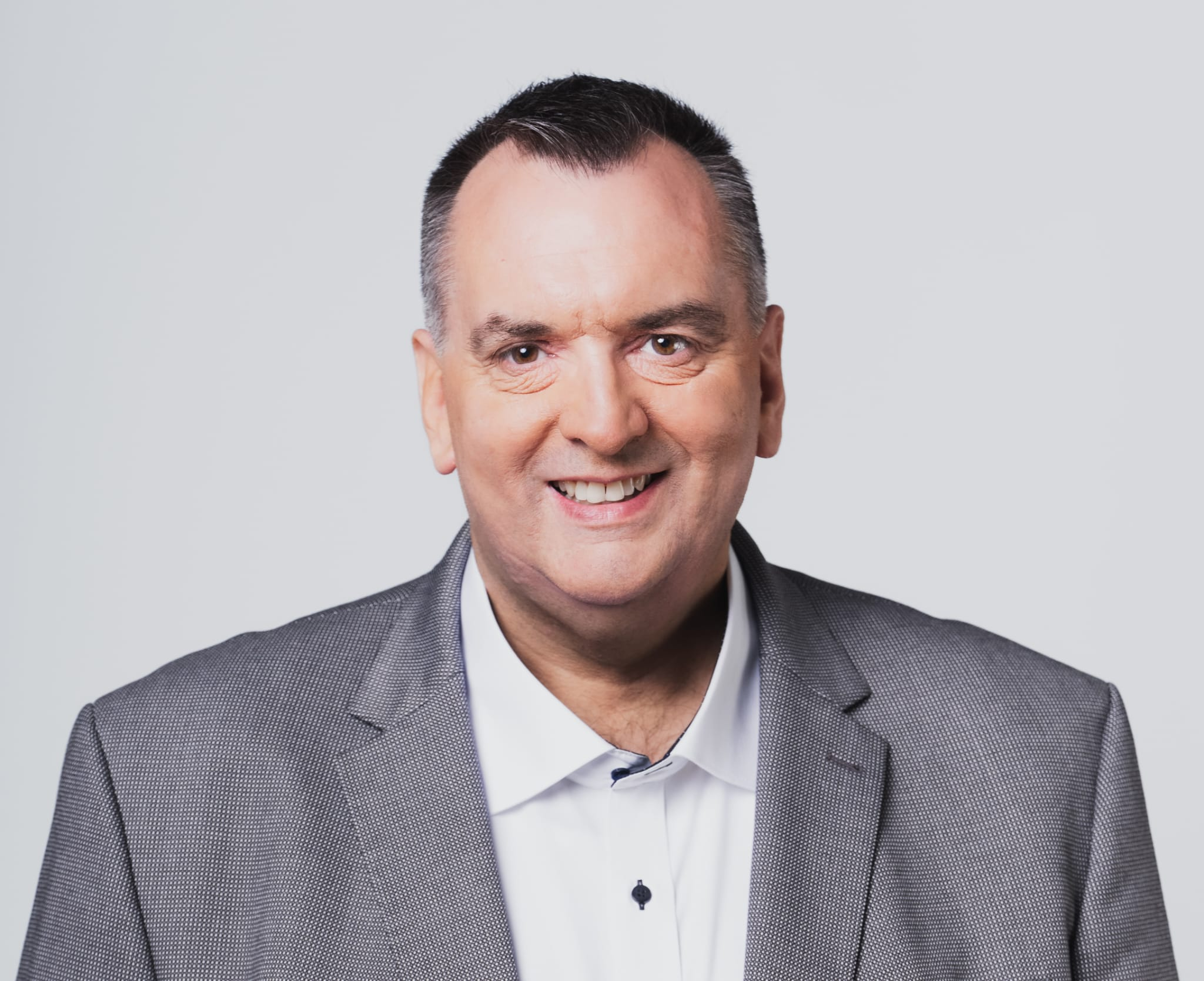
- Mayr in 2026

Member of the Landtag of Baden-Württemberg
- Incumbent
- Assumed office 14 April 2021
- Constituency: Bretten

Personal details
- Born: 8 June 1972 (age 53)
- Party: Christian Democratic Union

Ansgar Mayr (born 8 June 1972) is a German politician serving as a member of the Landtag of Baden-Württemberg since 2021. He has served as deputy group leader of the Christian Democratic Union since 2026.
