= Erwin Eckert =

Member of the Landtag of Baden-Württemberg
- In office 1952–1956

Member of the Landtag of Baden
- In office 1946–1952

Personal details
- Born: July 16, 1893 Zaisenhausen, German Empire
- Died: December 20, 1972 (aged 79) Mannheim, West Germany
- Party: German Communist Party (1968-); Communist Party of Germany (1931-1956); Social Democratic Party of Germany (1911-1931)
- Occupation: Clergyman, and politician

Military service
- Allegiance: German Empire
- Branch/service: Imperial German Army
- Years of service: 1914-1918
- Battles/wars: First World War

Erwin Eckert (16 July 1893 – 20 December 1972) was a German Lutheran clergyman and a Social Democratic, later Communist politician.

He founded the Covenant of Religious Socialists of Germany (Bund religiöser Sozialisten Deutschlands) in 1926 and served as its chairman until 1931. Eckert belonged to the left wing of the Social Democratic Party, but switched to the Communist Party of Germany in 1931 and published in October 1931 the brochure »Die Kirche und die KPD. Stadtpfarrer Eckert kommt zur KPD« ("The church and the Communist Party of Germany. Pastor Eckert joins the Communist Party), which made him known across Germany.

During the Nazi regime he was imprisoned twice. In 1945 he became the chairman of the Southern Baden section of the Communist Party (in the French occupation zone). He served in the Provisional Government of Baden and in the second cabinet as the State Commissar for Reconstruction; he also functioned as the chairman of the communist faction in the Baden parliament.

He was a regional MP until 1956, when the Communist Party of Germany was outlawed in the Federal Republic of Germany. In 1960 he was sentenced to 9 months in prison for participation in a peace movement group that was classified as anticonstitutional.

Erwin Eckert was elected as the vice-president of the World Peace Council in 1950.

When the German Communist Party was founded (as a new legal party for West German communists), Eckert joined its ranks.

== Bibliography ==
- Eckert, Erwin. In: Hermann Weber, Andreas Herbst: Deutsche Kommunisten. Biographisches Handbuch 1918 bis 1945. 2., überarbeitete und stark erweiterte Auflage. Dietz, Berlin 2008, ISBN 978-3-320-02130-6.

== See also ==
- Religious communism
