= Kraichbach =

River in Germany

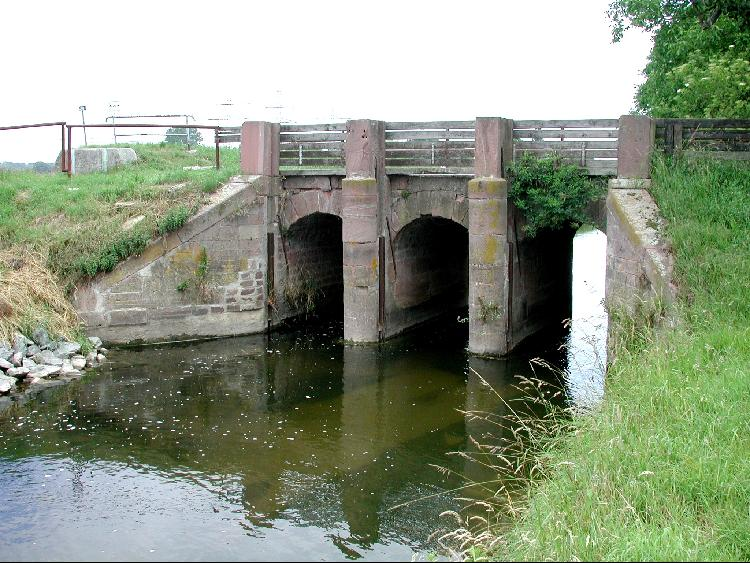
- The Kraichbach between Hockenheim and Ketsch

Location
- Country: Germany
- State: Baden-Württemberg

Physical characteristics
- Source
  - coordinates: 49°2′33″N 8°50′48″E
  - elevation: 300 m (980 ft)
- Mouth
  - location: Rhine
  - coordinates: 49°21′48″N 8°30′54″E
  - elevation: 93 m (305 ft)
- Length: 60.0 km (37.3 mi)
- Basin size: 385 km^{2} (149 sq mi)

Basin features
- Progression: Rhine→ North Sea

The Kraichbach (German pronunciation: [ˈkʁaɪçbax]) is a 60-kilometre-long (37 mi) right tributary of the Rhine running through the German state of Baden-Württemberg. Its source is in the Kraichgau region near the municipality of Sternenfels. The brook then flows to the northwest through Kürnbach, Oberderdingen, Kraichtal, Ubstadt-Weiher, Bad Schönborn and Kronau, all in the district of Karlsruhe. It then enters the district of Rhein-Neckar-Kreis and flows through Sankt Leon-Rot, Reilingen, Hockenheim and Ketsch before joining the Rhine.

Notable locations near the stream include Gochsheim Castle, Schloss Kislau prison, and the Hockenheimring racing circuit.
