= Sulzfeld, Baden-Württemberg =

Sulzfeld
- Municipality
- Coat of arms

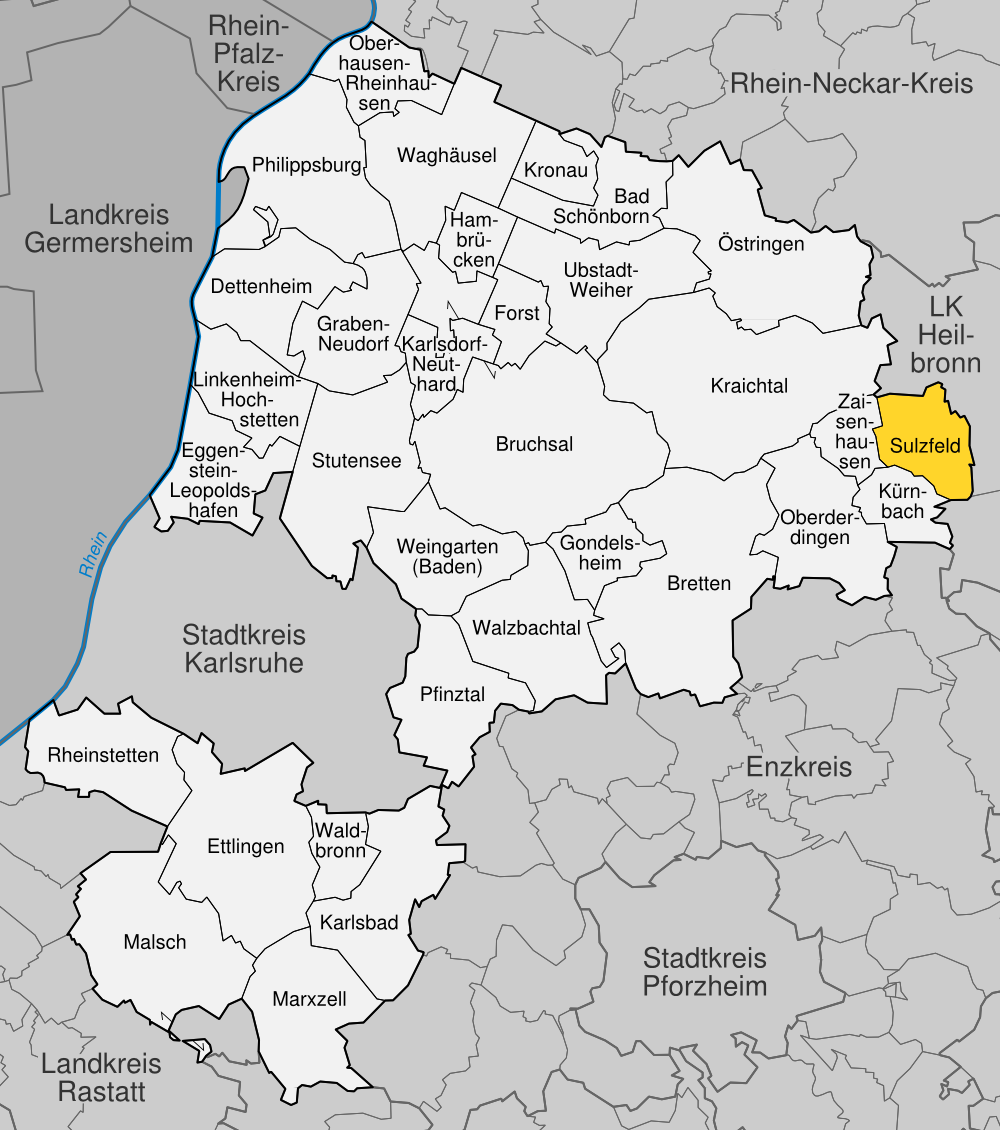
- Location of Sulzfeld within Karlsruhe district
- Interactive map of Sulzfeld
- Location within Germany Location within Baden-Württemberg
- Coordinates: 49°06′12″N 08°51′18″E
- Country: Germany
- State: Baden-Württemberg
- Admin. region: Karlsruhe
- District: Karlsruhe

Government
  - Mayor (2023–31): Simon Bolg

Area
  - Total: 18.76 km^{2} (7.24 sq mi)
- Elevation: 204 m (669 ft)

Population (2025-12-31)
  - Total: 5,112
  - Density: 272.5/km^{2} (705.8/sq mi)
- Time zone: UTC+01:00 (CET)
  - Summer (DST): UTC+02:00 (CEST)
- Postal codes: 75056
- Dialling codes: 07269
- Vehicle registration: KA
- Website: www.sulzfeld.de

Sulzfeld (South Franconian: Sulsfeld) is a municipality in the district of Karlsruhe in Baden-Württemberg in Germany.
