= Oberacker =

Oberacker is a surname. Notable people with the surname include:

- Betty Oberacker (1932–2024), American pianist and piano pedagogue
- Peter Oberacker (born 1963), American businessman and politician
- Richard Oberacker, American composer, lyricist, conductor, and playwright
