= Dettenheim =

- Municipality
- Flag Coat of arms

- Location of Dettenheim within Karlsruhe district
- Interactive map of Dettenheim
- Location within Germany Location within Baden-Württemberg
- Coordinates: 49°09′41″N 08°25′03″E
- Country: Germany
- State: Baden-Württemberg
- Admin. region: Karlsruhe
- District: Karlsruhe

Government
  - Mayor (2023–31): Frank Bolz (CDU)

Area
  - Total: 30.89 km^{2} (11.93 sq mi)
- Elevation: 103 m (338 ft)

Population (2025-12-31)
  - Total: 6,753
  - Density: 218.6/km^{2} (566.2/sq mi)
- Time zone: UTC+01:00 (CET)
  - Summer (DST): UTC+02:00 (CEST)
- Postal codes: 76706
- Dialling codes: 07247 · 07255
- Vehicle registration: KA
- Website: www.dettenheim.de

Dettenheim (South Franconian: Deddene) is a municipality in the district of Karlsruhe in Baden-Württemberg in Germany.

== Geography ==
The city of Dettenheim consists of the former municipalities Liedolsheim and Rußheim (Russheim). Liedolsheim includes the village of Liedolsheim and the inn and farm of Dettenheim. Rußheim includes the village of Rußheim, the site of a former RAD camp, and houses, grinding mill, public low-income housing estate, and lumber mill. In the area of Liedolsheim are the former settlements of Nackheim and Schure.

== History ==
In ancient times various German tribes inhabited the land along the banks of the river Rhine.

=== Alt-Dettenheim ===
The name Dettenheim goes back to an ancient village founded about 788 on the present-day western boundary of the municipality, located directly beside the river Rhine.

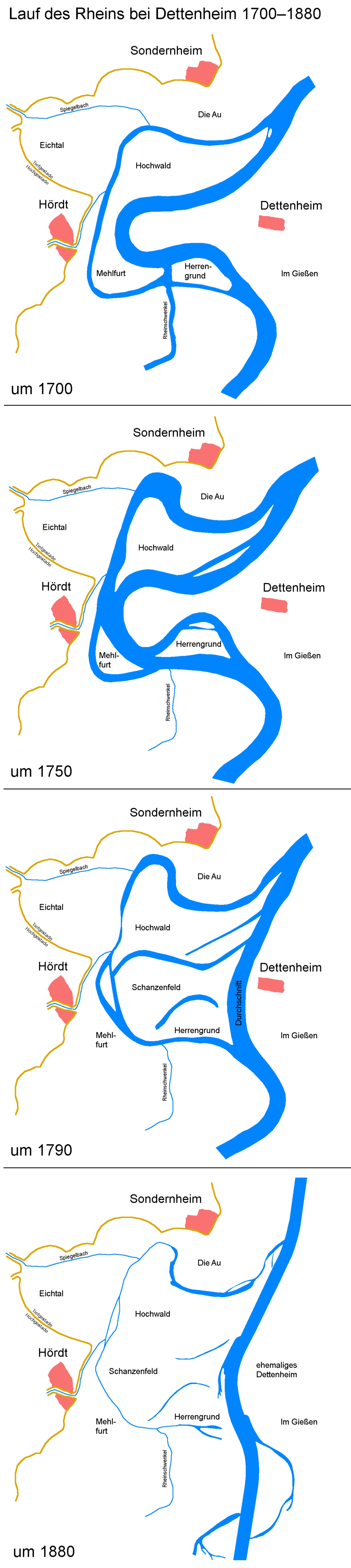
Alt-Dettenheim 1700-1880

The village was destroyed during the Thirty Years War (1618-1648), then rebuilt. Over the decades of the 18th century the course of the Rhine moved east, flooding the little community more frequently. (The Rhine has since been changed to the west in its course so that in 2000 the old settlement was a few hundred meters from the Rhine). Subsequently in 1813 all the villagers migrated about sixteen kilometers east southeast, entered the boundaries of what was then Altenbürg, and founded the village and church of Karlsdorf—now part of the municipality of Karlsdorf-Neuthard. Because Karl, Grand Duke of Baden, had granted approval for the move, the new settlement was named in honour of him. Today the old Dettenheim is called Alt-Dettenheim, which consists of only a few houses, including the Gasthaus Löwen (The Lion Guesthouse), rest building, a former brickworks and a memorial boulder. Alt-Dettenheim is a hamlet so is now within one of Dettenheim's two districts.

=== Liedolsheim ===
Liedolsheim is located at Latitude/Longitude: N 49° 9' 31.50" E 8° 25' 19.99" (49.15875, 8.42222). In the tumultuous time of the short lived Weimar Republic, Liedolsheim was an early stronghold of the Nazis. In the mid-1920s, agriculture dominated Liedolsheim; about 3% of the labor force were industrial workers in Karlsruhe and Hochstetten, or were employed at a local brickyard. Around 84% of farmers cultivated an area of less than two hectares and were therefore on additional farms as day laborers or relied on local trade. According to historian Kurt Hochstuhl, agriculture and handicrafts were exposed to a particular economic pressure, so that the "fear of proletarianization led" to a "collective mental state", "which could easily be exploited for political purposes".

The oldest local Nazi Party group in Baden, the Liedolsheimer group arose from a folkish "reading club for race and the German folk" in 1920 which German Nationalists protected and Trutzbund joined. After its ban in July 1922, the club constituted as a local branch of the Nazi party, which was later also banned in Baden. In July 1923, twenty-four Liedolsheimer residents - including the brothers Albert and Robert Roth and a village teacher named August Kramer - drove to Munich, officially to attend a gymnastics festival participate. In Munich there was a meeting with Hitler in which the formal recording of the Liedolsheimer group was arranged in the party. A "Schlageter celebration" declared Meeting of National Socialists in Liedolsheim in the same month had a police operation that resulted in the arrest of the brothers Roth failed in the face of their popular support. In the general election in May 1924 a Nazi Party associated organization, the Völkisch Social-block, received 51.9% of the vote in Liedolsheim and 6.5% overall. In December 1924 35.9% of the voters voted for the Deutschvolkische Nazi Party, voting for Robert Roth. In all future elections until 1933, at least one third of the voters decided for the Nazis. In the mayoral election in 1925, there were National Socialists provoked riots in which the Nazi Party member Gustav Kammerer was shot. After a major fire in which several houses and several barns were destroyed in August 1927, Hitler visited Liedolsheim.

=== Rußheim ===
Since at least 1653 Rußheim has been a community. It is located at Latitude/Longitude: N 49° 11' 4.99" E 8° 25' 19.99" (49.18472, 8.42222). The Rußheimer Altrhein-Elisabethenwört is a large nature area, with walking trails and meandering bicycle paths. Photographers and painters frequent the area.

=== Liedolsheim-Rußheim renamed Dettenheim ===
On January 1, 1975, the municipalities of Liedolsheim and Rußheim were merged in the course of municipal reform to become the community of Liedolsheim-Rußheim. For simplicity the new municipality was renamed Dettenheim on 1 January 1978 because the lengthy name Liedolsheim-Rußheim had been found to be disadvantageous and the historical name Dettenheim was preferred versus possible artificial names.

The previous separation of Dettenheim is the reason that its districts have different area codes.

=== Coats of Arms of Districts ===
Dettenheim has two Ortsteile i.e. Districts.

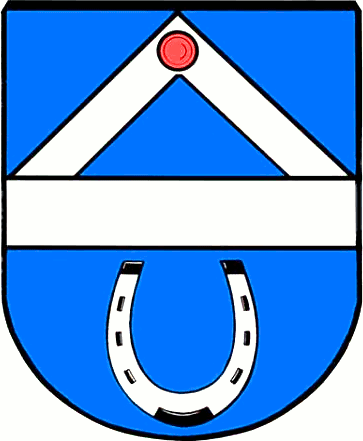
Liedolsheim

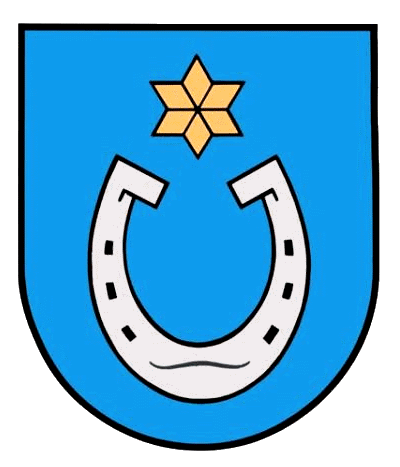
Rußheim
