= Zaisenhausen =

- Municipality
- Coat of arms

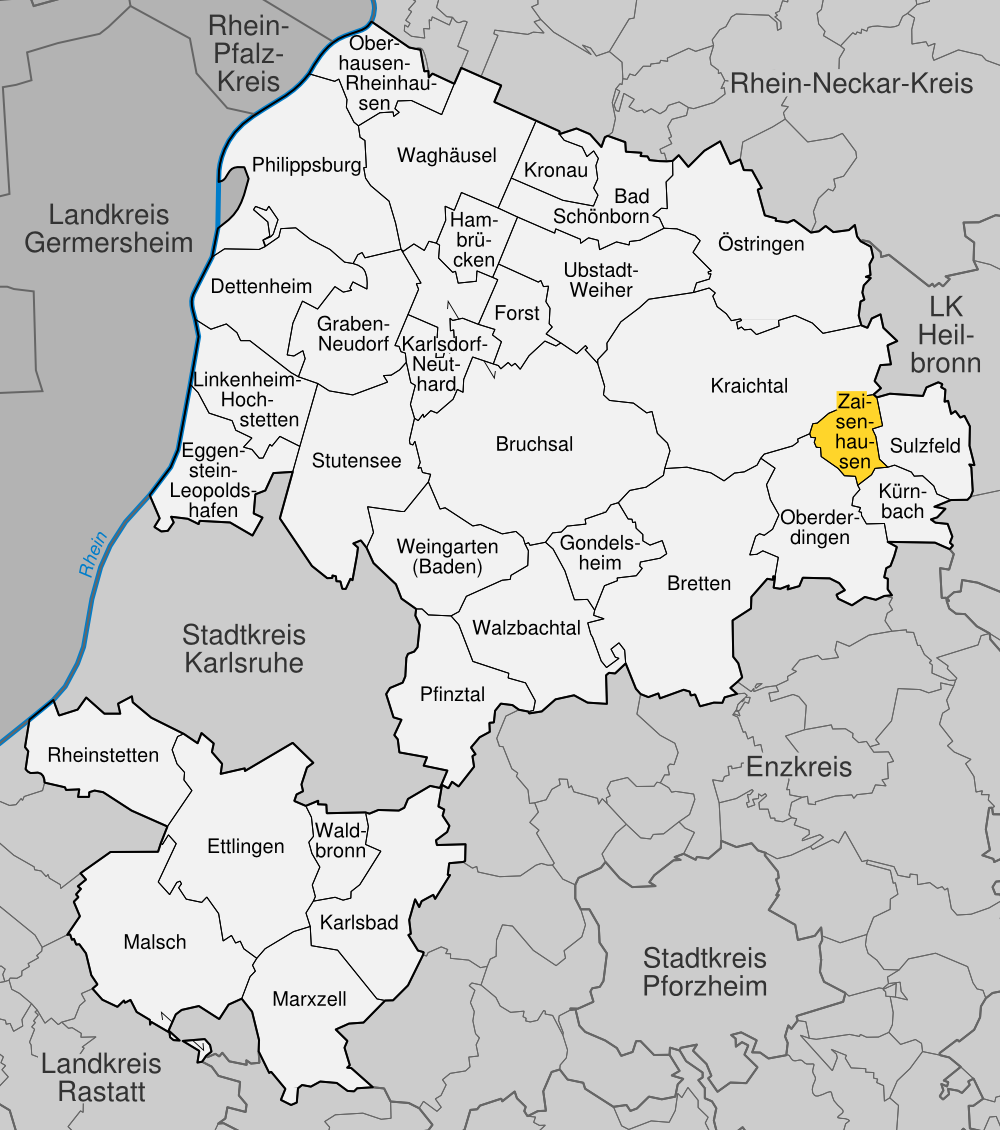
- Location of Zaisenhausen within Karlsruhe district
- Interactive map of Zaisenhausen
- Location within Germany Location within Baden-Württemberg
- Coordinates: 49°06′25″N 08°48′57″E
- Country: Germany
- State: Baden-Württemberg
- Admin. region: Karlsruhe
- District: Karlsruhe

Government
  - Mayor (2021–29): Cathrin Wöhrle

Area
  - Total: 10.11 km^{2} (3.90 sq mi)
- Elevation: 175 m (574 ft)

Population (2025-12-31)
  - Total: 1,885
  - Density: 186.4/km^{2} (482.9/sq mi)
- Time zone: UTC+01:00 (CET)
  - Summer (DST): UTC+02:00 (CEST)
- Postal codes: 75059
- Dialling codes: 07258
- Vehicle registration: KA
- Website: www.zaisenhausen.de

Zaisenhausen is a municipality in the district of Karlsruhe in Baden-Württemberg in Germany.

== Notable people ==
- Erwin Eckert, clergyman and politician
