= Karlsruhe-Land (electoral district) =

Federal electoral district of Germany

272 Karlsruhe-Land
- Former electoral district for the Bundestag
- Karlsruhe-Land in 2025
- State: Baden-Württemberg
- Population: 287,100 (2019)
- Electorate: 209,147 (2021)
- Major settlements: Ettlingen; Bretten; Stutensee
- Area: 718.4 km^{2}

Former electoral district
- Created: 1949; 1980 (re-established)
- Abolished: 1965
- Party: CDU
- Member: Nicolas Zippelius
- Elected: 2021, 2025

Karlsruhe-Land is an electoral constituency (German: Wahlkreis) represented in the Bundestag. It elects one member via first-past-the-post voting. Under the current constituency numbering system, it is designated as constituency 272. It is located in northwestern Baden-Württemberg, comprising the central and southern parts of the Landkreis Karlsruhe district.

Karlsruhe-Land was created for the inaugural 1949 federal election. It was abolished in 1965 and re-established in the 1980 federal election. Since 2021, it has been represented by Nicolas Zippelius of the Christian Democratic Union (CDU).

== Geography ==
Karlsruhe-Land is located in northwestern Baden-Württemberg. As of the 2021 federal election, it comprises the Landkreis Karlsruhe district excluding the municipalities of Bad Schönborn, Bruchsal, Forst, Hambrücken, Karlsdorf-Neuthard, Kronau, Oberhausen-Rheinhausen, Östringen, Philippsburg, Ubstadt-Weiher, and Waghäusel.

== History ==
Karlsruhe-Land was created in 1949. In the 1949 election, it was Württemberg-Baden Landesbezirk Baden constituency 4 in the number system. In the 1953 through 1961 elections, it was number 178. Originally, it comprised the independent city of Pforzheim, the Landkreis Pforzheim district, and the Landkreis Karlsruhe district excluding the municipalities of Bretten, Oberderdingen, and Walzbachtal.

Karlsruhe-Land was abolished in the 1965 election. Its area was divided between the new constituencies of Pforzheim – Karlsruhe-Land I and Bruchsal – Karlsruhe-Land II.

Karlsruhe-Land was re-established in the 1980 election. In the 1980 through 1998 elections, it was constituency 176. In the 2002 and 2005 elections, it was number 273. Since the 2009 election, it has been number 272. In the 1980 through 1998 elections, it comprised the Landkreis Karlsruhe district excluding the municipalities of Ettlingen, Malsch, Oberderdingen, and Rheinstetten. It acquired its current borders in the 2002 election.

Election	No.	Name	Borders
1949	4	Karlsruhe-Land	Pforzheim city; Landkreis Pforzheim district; Landkreis Karlsruhe district (excluding Bretten, Oberderdingen, and Walzbachtal municipalities)
1953	178	Karlsruhe-Land	Pforzheim city; Landkreis Pforzheim district; Landkreis Karlsruhe district (excluding Bretten, Oberderdingen, and Walzbachtal municipalities)
1957	178	Karlsruhe-Land	Pforzheim city; Landkreis Pforzheim district; Landkreis Karlsruhe district (excluding Bretten, Oberderdingen, and Walzbachtal municipalities)
1961	178	Karlsruhe-Land	Pforzheim city; Landkreis Pforzheim district; Landkreis Karlsruhe district (excluding Bretten, Oberderdingen, and Walzbachtal municipalities)
1965	Abolished		
1969	Abolished		
1972	Abolished		
1976	Abolished		
1980	176	Karlsruhe-Land	Landkreis Karlsruhe district (excluding Ettlingen, Malsch, Oberderdingen, and Rheinstetten municipalities)
1983	176	Karlsruhe-Land	Landkreis Karlsruhe district (excluding Ettlingen, Malsch, Oberderdingen, and Rheinstetten municipalities)
1987	176	Karlsruhe-Land	Landkreis Karlsruhe district (excluding Ettlingen, Malsch, Oberderdingen, and Rheinstetten municipalities)
1990	176	Karlsruhe-Land	Landkreis Karlsruhe district (excluding Ettlingen, Malsch, Oberderdingen, and Rheinstetten municipalities)
1994	176	Karlsruhe-Land	Landkreis Karlsruhe district (excluding Ettlingen, Malsch, Oberderdingen, and Rheinstetten municipalities)
1998	176	Karlsruhe-Land	Landkreis Karlsruhe district (excluding Ettlingen, Malsch, Oberderdingen, and Rheinstetten municipalities)
2002	273	Karlsruhe-Land	Landkreis Karlsruhe district (excluding Bad Schönborn, Bruchsal, Forst, Hambrücken, Karlsdorf-Neuthard, Kronau, Oberhausen-Rheinhausen, Östringen, Philippsburg, Ubstadt-Weiher, and Waghäusel municipalities)
2005	273	Karlsruhe-Land	Landkreis Karlsruhe district (excluding Bad Schönborn, Bruchsal, Forst, Hambrücken, Karlsdorf-Neuthard, Kronau, Oberhausen-Rheinhausen, Östringen, Philippsburg, Ubstadt-Weiher, and Waghäusel municipalities)
2009	272	Karlsruhe-Land	Landkreis Karlsruhe district (excluding Bad Schönborn, Bruchsal, Forst, Hambrücken, Karlsdorf-Neuthard, Kronau, Oberhausen-Rheinhausen, Östringen, Philippsburg, Ubstadt-Weiher, and Waghäusel municipalities)
2013	272	Karlsruhe-Land	Landkreis Karlsruhe district (excluding Bad Schönborn, Bruchsal, Forst, Hambrücken, Karlsdorf-Neuthard, Kronau, Oberhausen-Rheinhausen, Östringen, Philippsburg, Ubstadt-Weiher, and Waghäusel municipalities)
2017	272	Karlsruhe-Land	Landkreis Karlsruhe district (excluding Bad Schönborn, Bruchsal, Forst, Hambrücken, Karlsdorf-Neuthard, Kronau, Oberhausen-Rheinhausen, Östringen, Philippsburg, Ubstadt-Weiher, and Waghäusel municipalities)
2021	272	Karlsruhe-Land	Landkreis Karlsruhe district (excluding Bad Schönborn, Bruchsal, Forst, Hambrücken, Karlsdorf-Neuthard, Kronau, Oberhausen-Rheinhausen, Östringen, Philippsburg, Ubstadt-Weiher, and Waghäusel municipalities)
2025	272	Karlsruhe-Land	Landkreis Karlsruhe district (excluding Bad Schönborn, Bruchsal, Forst, Hambrücken, Karlsdorf-Neuthard, Kronau, Oberhausen-Rheinhausen, Östringen, Philippsburg, Ubstadt-Weiher, and Waghäusel municipalities)

== Members ==
The constituency has been held continuously by the Christian Democratic Union (CDU) throughout both its incarnations. It was first represented by Gottfried Leonhard from 1949 until its abolition in 1965. After its re-establishment, it was represented by Klaus Bühler from 1980 to 2002. Axel Fischer was representative from 2002 to 2021. He was succeeded by Nicolas Zippelius in 2021.

Election	Member	Party	%
1949	Gottfried Leonhard	CDU	34.5
1953	Gottfried Leonhard	CDU	52.9
1957	Gottfried Leonhard	CDU	53.8
1961	Gottfried Leonhard	CDU	45.1
Abolished (1965–1980)
1980	Klaus Bühler	CDU	54.5
1983	Klaus Bühler	CDU	51.4
1987	Klaus Bühler	CDU	58.4
1990	Klaus Bühler	CDU	54.7
1994	Klaus Bühler	CDU	53.2
1998	Klaus Bühler	CDU	46.7
2002	Axel Fischer	CDU	47.0
2005	Axel Fischer	CDU	48.3
2009	Axel Fischer	CDU	45.2
2013	Axel Fischer	CDU	53.3
2017	Axel Fischer	CDU	40.5
2021	Nicolas Zippelius	CDU	30.4
2025	Nicolas Zippelius	CDU	39.2

== Election results ==
=== 2025 election ===
Federal election (2025): Karlsruhe-Land
Notes:	Blue background denotes the winner of the electorate vote. Pink background denotes a candidate elected from their party list. Yellow background denotes an electorate win by a list member, or other incumbent. A ✓ or ✗ denotes status of any incumbent, win or lose respectively.						
Party	Candidate	Votes	%	±%	Party votes	%	±%
CDU	✓ Nicolas Zippelius	68,439	39.2	▲8.7	58,135	33.1	▲7.4
AfD	Thomas Möckel	32,290	18.5	▲9.5	33,393	19.0	▲9.5
SPD	Assad Hussain	26,152	15.0	▼7.9	26,361	15.0	▼8.1
Greens	Sebastian Grässer	22,739	13.0	▼3.7	23,378	13.3	▼2.9
Left	Jürgen Creutzmann	8,836	5.1	▲2.6	9,790	5.6	▲2.9
FDP	Sebastian Weber	7,333	4.2	▼7.3	9,721	5.5	▼9.3
FW	Ulrich Stoll	4,592	2.6	0.0	2,329	1.3	▼0.5
dieBasis				▼2.1	458	0.3	▼1.5
Tierschutzpartei					1,774	1.0	▲0.4
PARTEI	Vanessa Schulz	2,083	1.1	▼0.3	889	0.5	▼0.4
Team Todenhöfer							▼0.3
Bündnis C					408	0.2	▼0.1
Volt	Tobias Mexner	2,310	1.3		1,524	0.9	▲0.5
Pirates							▼0.3
ÖDP				▼0.3	255	0.1	▼0.1
Humanists				▼0.3			▼0.1
Bürgerbewegung							▼0.4
Gesundheitsforschung							▼0.1
BD					193	0.1	
BSW					6,744	3.8	
MLPD					50	0.0	0.0
Informal votes		1,476			848		
Total valid votes		174,774			175,402		
Turnout		176,250	85.0	▲4.7			
CDU hold	Majority			▲8.7			

=== 2021 election ===
Federal election (2021): Karlsruhe-Land
Notes:	Blue background denotes the winner of the electorate vote. Pink background denotes a candidate elected from their party list. Yellow background denotes an electorate win by a list member, or other incumbent. A ✓ or ✗ denotes status of any incumbent, win or lose respectively.						
Party	Candidate	Votes	%	±%	Party votes	%	±%
CDU	Nicolas Zippelius	50,581	30.4	▼10.0	42,831	25.7	▼9.7
SPD	Patrick Diebold	37,948	22.8	▲3.1	38,474	23.1	▲6.0
Greens	Sebastian Grässer	27,755	16.7	▲5.3	26,969	16.2	▲3.9
FDP	Hans-Günther Lohr	19,066	11.5	▲2.4	24,660	14.8	▲2.0
AfD	René Rotzinger	14,963	9.0	▼2.7	15,869	9.5	▼3.0
FW	Steffen Schmid	4,358	2.6	▲1.0	3,001	1.8	▲0.9
Left	Jörg Rupp	4,040	2.4	▼2.1	4,483	2.7	▼2.8
dieBasis	Ralf Baßler	3,505	2.1		2,991	1.8	
Tierschutzpartei					2,287	1.4	▲0.5
PARTEI	David Braitmaier	2,437	1.5	▲0.1	1,478	0.9	0.0
Team Todenhöfer					569	0.3	
Bündnis C					548	0.3	
Volt					532	0.3	
Pirates					525	0.3	▼0.1
ÖDP	Georg Austermann	562	0.3		330	0.2	0.0
Independent	Heidemarie Mund	548	0.3				
Humanists	Niklas Goerke	496	0.3		245	0.1	
Bürgerbewegung					198	0.1	
Gesundheitsforschung					197	0.1	
NPD					143	0.1	▼0.1
DiB					128	0.1	▼0.1
Bündnis 21					69	0.0	
LKR					60	0.0	
MLPD					26	0.0	0.0
DKP					20	0.0	0.0
Informal votes		1,687			1,313		
Total valid votes		166,259			166,633		
Turnout		167,946	80.3	▼0.2			
CDU hold	Majority	12,633	7.6	▼13.1			

=== 2017 election ===
Federal election (2017): Karlsruhe-Land
Notes:	Blue background denotes the winner of the electorate vote. Pink background denotes a candidate elected from their party list. Yellow background denotes an electorate win by a list member, or other incumbent. A ✓ or ✗ denotes status of any incumbent, win or lose respectively.						
Party	Candidate	Votes	%	±%	Party votes	%	±%
CDU	✓ Axel Fischer	67,396	40.4	▼12.9	59,137	35.4	▼11.3
SPD	Patrick Diebold	32,886	19.7	▼6.2	28,591	17.1	▼4.0
AfD	Alexander Arpaschi	19,512	11.7		20,887	12.5	▲6.5
Greens	Pascal Haggenmüller	19,076	11.4	▲3.6	20,489	12.3	▲2.7
FDP	Christian Jung	15,138	9.1	▲6.2	21,441	12.8	▲6.8
Left	Klaus Huska	7,627	4.6	▲0.8	9,119	5.5	▲1.4
Tierschutzpartei					1,479	0.9	▲0.1
FW	Heinz Schammert	2,657	1.6	0.0	1,475	0.9	▲0.1
PARTEI	Lars Hannemann	2,261	1.4		1,420	0.8	
Pirates					660	0.4	▼2.0
Tierschutzallianz					429	0.3	
NPD					309	0.2	▼0.6
ÖDP					297	0.2	0.0
BGE					275	0.2	
DiB					261	0.2	
DM					244	0.1	
Menschliche Welt					207	0.1	
V-Partei³					185	0.1	
DIE RECHTE	Christian Worch	187	0.1		120	0.1	
MLPD					67	0.0	0.0
DKP					34	0.0	
Informal votes		2,061			1,675		
Total valid votes		166,740			167,126		
Turnout		168,801	70.5	▲4.2			
CDU hold	Majority	34,510	20.7	▼6.7			

=== 2013 election ===
Federal election (2013): Karlsruhe-Land
Notes:	Blue background denotes the winner of the electorate vote. Pink background denotes a candidate elected from their party list. Yellow background denotes an electorate win by a list member, or other incumbent. A ✓ or ✗ denotes status of any incumbent, win or lose respectively.						
Party	Candidate	Votes	%	±%	Party votes	%	±%
CDU	✓ Axel Fischer	83,848	53.3	▲8.1	73,805	46.7	▲10.6
SPD	Vanessa Rieß	40,735	25.9	▲0.3	33,416	21.1	▲0.8
Greens	Danyal Bayaz	12,298	7.8	▼2.3	15,175	9.6	▼2.2
Left	Heinz-Peter Schwertges	5,896	3.7	▼1.9	6,461	4.1	▼2.4
FDP	Patrick Meinhardt	4,490	2.9	▼8.7	9,553	6.0	▼13.1
AfD					9,473	6.0	
Pirates	Christian Alkemper	4,374	2.8		3,761	2.4	▲0.2
FW	Henning Gaus	2,537	1.6		1,205	0.8	
NPD	Karl Däschner	1,853	1.2	▼0.3	1,301	0.8	▼0.2
Tierschutzpartei					1,278	0.8	▲0.1
REP	Ursula Holzwarth	1,224	0.8		730	0.5	▼0.3
PBC					491	0.3	▼0.3
RENTNER					386	0.2	
ÖDP					346	0.2	0.0
Volksabstimmung					258	0.2	▼0.1
PRO					196	0.1	
Party of Reason					151	0.1	
BIG					62	0.0	
MLPD					41	0.0	0.0
BüSo					16	0.0	0.0
Informal votes		2,737			1,887		
Total valid votes		157,255			158,105		
Turnout		159,992	76.3	▲1.7			
CDU hold	Majority	43,113	27.4	▲7.8			

=== 2009 election ===
Federal election (2009): Karlsruhe-Land
Notes:	Blue background denotes the winner of the electorate vote. Pink background denotes a candidate elected from their party list. Yellow background denotes an electorate win by a list member, or other incumbent. A ✓ or ✗ denotes status of any incumbent, win or lose respectively.						
Party	Candidate	Votes	%	±%	Party votes	%	±%
CDU	✓ Axel Fischer	68,951	45.2	▼3.1	55,285	36.1	▼4.6
SPD	Ingo Juchler	39,021	25.6	▼10.0	31,160	20.3	▼10.3
FDP	Patrick Meinhardt	17,668	11.6	▲6.6	29,292	19.1	▲7.1
Greens	Jörg Rupp	15,506	10.2	▲4.3	18,066	11.8	▲2.6
Left	Thurid Feldmann	8,569	5.6	▲2.9	9,935	6.5	▲3.0
Pirates					3,307	2.2	
NPD	Nico Schiemann	2,310	1.5	0.0	1,567	1.0	0.0
REP					1,228	0.8	0.0
Tierschutzpartei					1,107	0.7	
PBC					896	0.6	▼0.1
Independent	Paul Zundel	506	0.3				
Volksabstimmung					406	0.3	
ÖDP					390	0.3	
DIE VIOLETTEN					263	0.2	
DVU					95	0.1	
BüSo					71	0.0	0.0
MLPD					67	0.0	0.0
ADM					48	0.0	
Informal votes		2,991			2,339		
Total valid votes		152,531			153,183		
Turnout		155,522	74.5	▼6.3			
CDU hold	Majority	29,930	19.6	▲6.9			

=== 2005 election ===
Federal election (2005): Karlsruhe-Land
Notes:	Blue background denotes the winner of the electorate vote. Pink background denotes a candidate elected from their party list. Yellow background denotes an electorate win by a list member, or other incumbent. A ✓ or ✗ denotes status of any incumbent, win or lose respectively.						
Party	Candidate	Votes	%	±%	Party votes	%	±%
CDU	✓ Axel Fischer	78,578	48.3	▲1.3	66,466	40.7	▼2.6
SPD	Jörg Tauss	57,983	35.6	▼3.3	50,046	30.7	▼4.7
Greens	Jörg Rupp	9,599	5.9	▼1.4	14,962	9.2	▲0.2
FDP	Patrick Mainhardt	8,182	5.0	▼1.7	19,680	12.1	▲3.9
Left	Niko Fostiropoulos	4,446	2.7		5,649	3.5	▲2.7
NPD	Hubert Jungbauer	2,415	1.5		1,713	1.0	▲0.7
PBC	Heiko Sitzler	1,532	0.9		1,166	0.7	▲0.1
REP					1,360	0.8	▲0.1
Familie					1,237	0.8	
GRAUEN					699	0.4	▲0.3
BüSo					109	0.1	
MLPD					85	0.1	
Informal votes		3,171			2,734		
Total valid votes		162,735			163,172		
Turnout		165,906	80.9	▼9.3			
CDU hold	Majority	20,595	12.7				
