= Klaus Bühler =

German politician (1941–2021)

Member of the Bundestag
- In office 14 December 1976 – 17 October 2002
- Preceded by: Helmut Artzinger
- Succeeded by: Axel Fischer
- Constituency: Bruchsal – Karlsruhe-Land II (1976–1980); Karlsruhe-Land (1980–2002)

Personal details
- Born: 16 January 1941 Bad Sachsa, Germany
- Died: 3 February 2021 (aged 80) Bruchsal, Germany
- Party: Christian Democratic Union

Klaus Bühler (16 January 1941 – 3 February 2021) was a German politician of the Christian Democratic Union (CDU) who served as member of the German Bundestag.

== Life ==
After elementary school, Buhler attended the humanistic grammar school in Bruchsal. This was followed by teacher training in Heidelberg and Karlsruhe. In 1965, he became district chairman of the Junge Union in the district of Bruchsal, which he remained for ten years. From 1968 to 1976, he was a member of the Bruchsal municipal council. From 1971 to 1976, he was also a member of the Bruchsal district council and Karlsruhe district council respectively. He worked as a secondary school teacher until 1974, after which he became head of the Heidelberg branch office for the Karlsruhe administrative district of the Landeszentrale für politische Bildung.

In 1976, he was elected to the Bundestag for the first time and returned to parliament in the following legislative periods. Since 1987, he was the representative of the Federal Republic of Germany in the Parliamentary Assembly of the Council of Europe and at the same time representative in the Assembly of the Western European Union. In 2002, he resigned from the Bundestag.

He died eighteen days after his 80th birthday.
