= Werner Fischer =

German academic and engineer (1939–2025)

PhD Werner Fischer
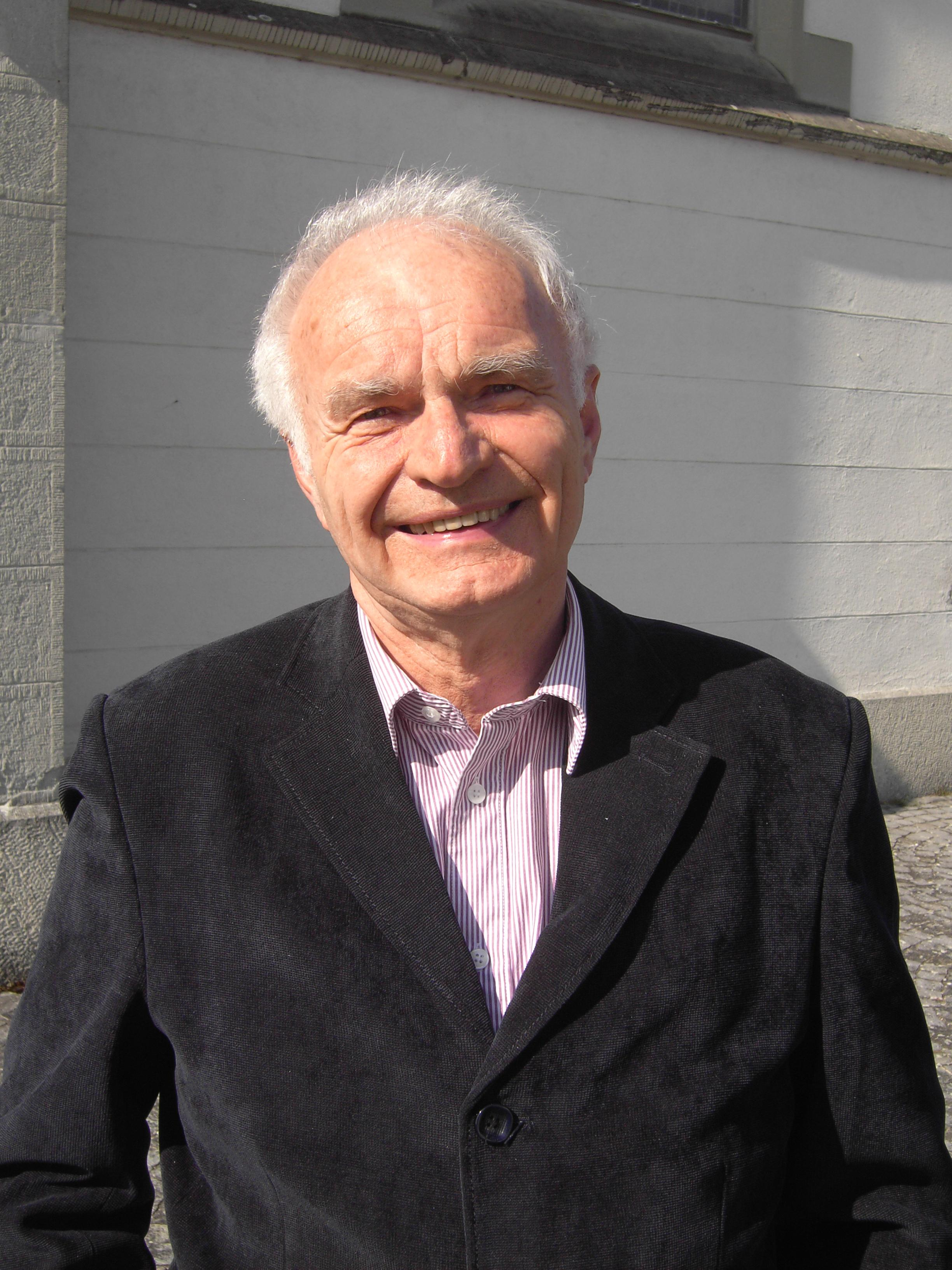
- Born: Werner Fischer; 7 November 1939; Epfenbach, Gau Baden, Germany
- Died: 5 November 2025 (age 85); Karlsruhe, Baden-Württemberg, Germany
- Education: Karlsruhe Institute of Technology
- Occupations: Academic, engineer
- Employer: Karlsruhe University of Applied Sciences
- Children: Axel Fischer, Lutz Fischer
- Awards: Cross of Merit of the Federal Republic of Germany

Werner Fischer (7 November 1939 – 5 November 2025) was a German academic and engineer. Between 1980 and 1990, he served as vice-president and between 1990 and 2005 as the president of Karlsruhe University of Applied Sciences (HAK). In 2005, Fischer was a recipient of the Cross of Merit of the Federal Republic of Germany. He was the father of the politicians Axel Fischer and Lutz Fischer.

== Life and career ==
Fischer was born in Epfenbach, Gau Baden, Nazi Germany (present-day Germany). He completed his Abitur at Wilhelmi-Gymnasium in Sinsheim and then studied mechanical engineering at Karlsruhe Institute of Technology.

Fischer resided in Stutensee. He died on 5 November 2025, at the age of 85.

== Awards ==
- Prize recipient of the International Society of Engineering Pedagogics (1992)
- Honorary Gold Medal of the Community Day of Baden-Württemberg (1994)
- Honorary Doctorate of Georgian Technical University (1997)
- Honorary Doctorate of Nottingham Trent University (1998)
- Golden Badge of Honor of the International Society of Engineering Pedagogics (2003)
- Federal Cross of Merit of the Federal Republic of Germany (2003)
- Honorary Curator of Karlsruhe University of Applied Sciences (2005)
- Cross of Merit of Karlsruhe University of Applied Sciences (2005)
- Medal of Honor of Karlsruhe University of Applied Sciences (2019)
