= Lutz Fischer =

German-born Swiss politician (born 1967)

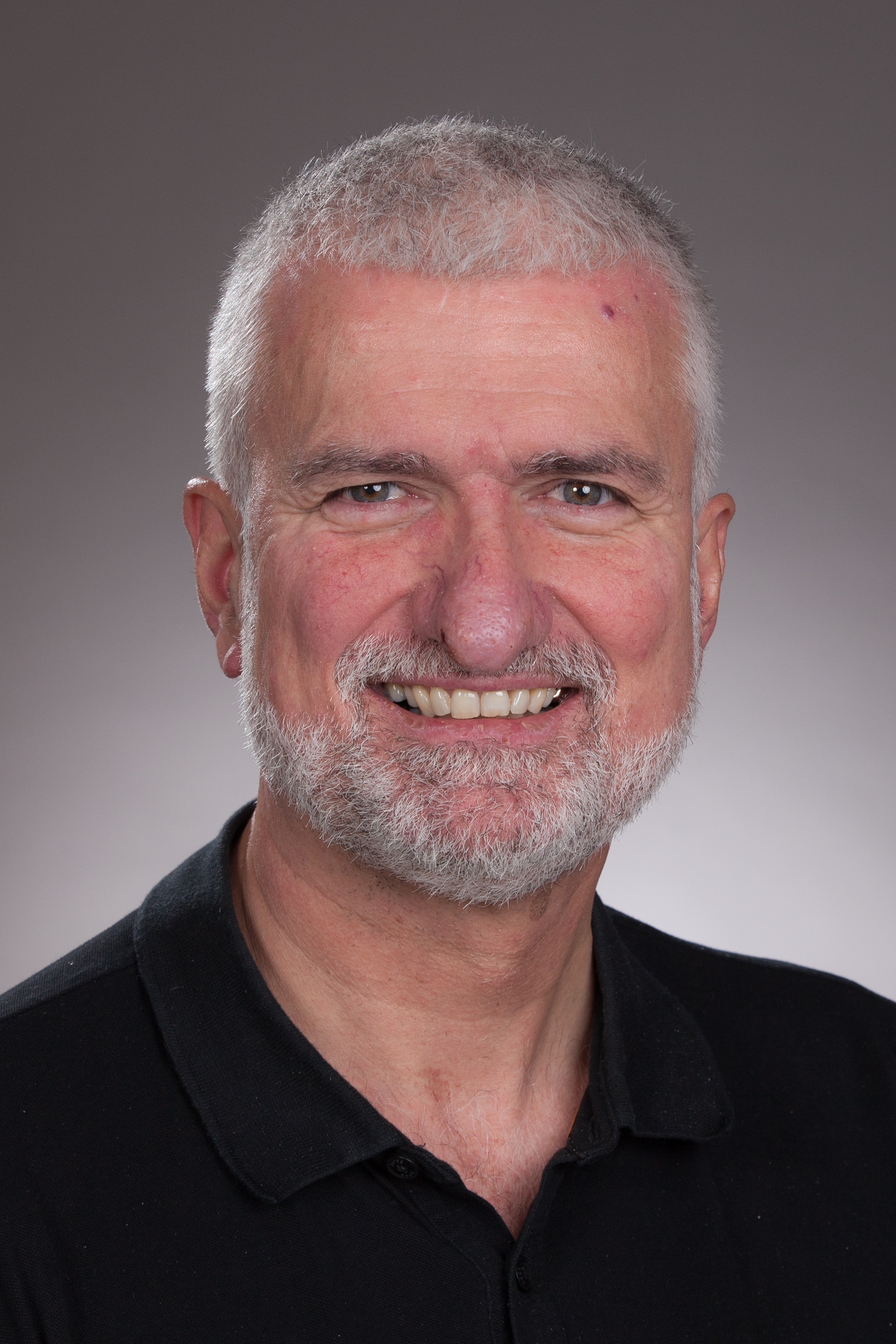
- Portrait, 2024

Member of the Grand Council of Aargau
- Incumbent
- Assumed office 19 November 2019
- Preceded by: Lilian Studer
- Constituency: Baden District

Personal details
- Born: 1 November 1967 (age 58) Karlsruhe, West Germany (now Germany)
- Citizenship: Switzerland; Germany
- Party: Evangelical People's Party of Switzerland
- Spouse: Kristin Lamprecht
- Relations: Axel Fischer (brother)
- Children: 5
- Parent: Werner Fischer (father)
- Website: Official website (in German)

Lutz Fischer (born 1 November 1967) is a German-born Swiss pastor and politician. He serves on the Grand Council of Aargau for the Evangelical People's Party of Switzerland (EVP) since 2019. Additionally he serves on the municipal council of Wettingen where he is also pastor. He is the son of Werner Fischer and brother to German politician Axel Fischer.

== Early life and education ==
Lutz Fischer grew up in Stutensee and attended school there. His father was Werner Fischer, one of his two brothers is Axel Fischer. After graduating from the Thomas Mann Gymnasium (Stutensee), he studied Protestant theology in Neuendettelsau, Marburg and Munich.

== Career ==
From 1995 to 1997, he was vicar in Sandhausen, after which he worked as a self-employed insurance advisor until the end of 1998 and completed his training as an insurance specialist (BWV). He held his first pastoral position in Rechthalten in the Canton of Fribourg and was ordained Verbi Divini Minster (VDM) by the Evangelical Reformed Church of the Canton of Fribourg on 2 July 2000. In August 2002, he joined the Aargau. There he was reformed pastor in Birmenstorf until March 2008, and since then he has been active in the Reformed parish of Wettingen-Neuenhof. Fischer also has a CAS in business administration for non-business administrators from the University of Applied Sciences Northwestern Switzerland.

== Politics ==
Fischer has been a member of the EPP since 2009. The Grand Council elections on 23 October 2016 he brought in the district of Baden, the second most votes of the candidates of the EPP-list. After the resignation of Lilian Studer, who was elected to the Swiss parliament in October 2019, he moved up to the Grand Council on 19 November 2019. He was confirmed in office in the elections on 18 October 2020 and 20 October 2024.
