= Alliance 90/The Greens Baden-Württemberg =

- Chairperson: Pascal Haggenmüller; Lena Schwelling
- Founded: 30 September 1979; 46 years ago
- Ideology: Green politics Social liberalism Pro-Europeanism
- Political position: Centre-left
- National affiliation: Alliance 90/The Greens
- Colours: Green
- Landtag of Baden-Württemberg: 57 / 154

Website
- www.gruene-bw.de

Alliance 90/The Greens Baden-Württemberg is one of the state associations of the German Green Party in Baden-Württemberg. With over 22,000 members, it is the third largest Green Party association in Germany, after North Rhine-Westphalia and Bavaria.

As of 2025, the parliamentary group is the largest in the Baden-Württemberg state parliament with 57 seats and has provided the state's minister-president since 2011.

== History ==
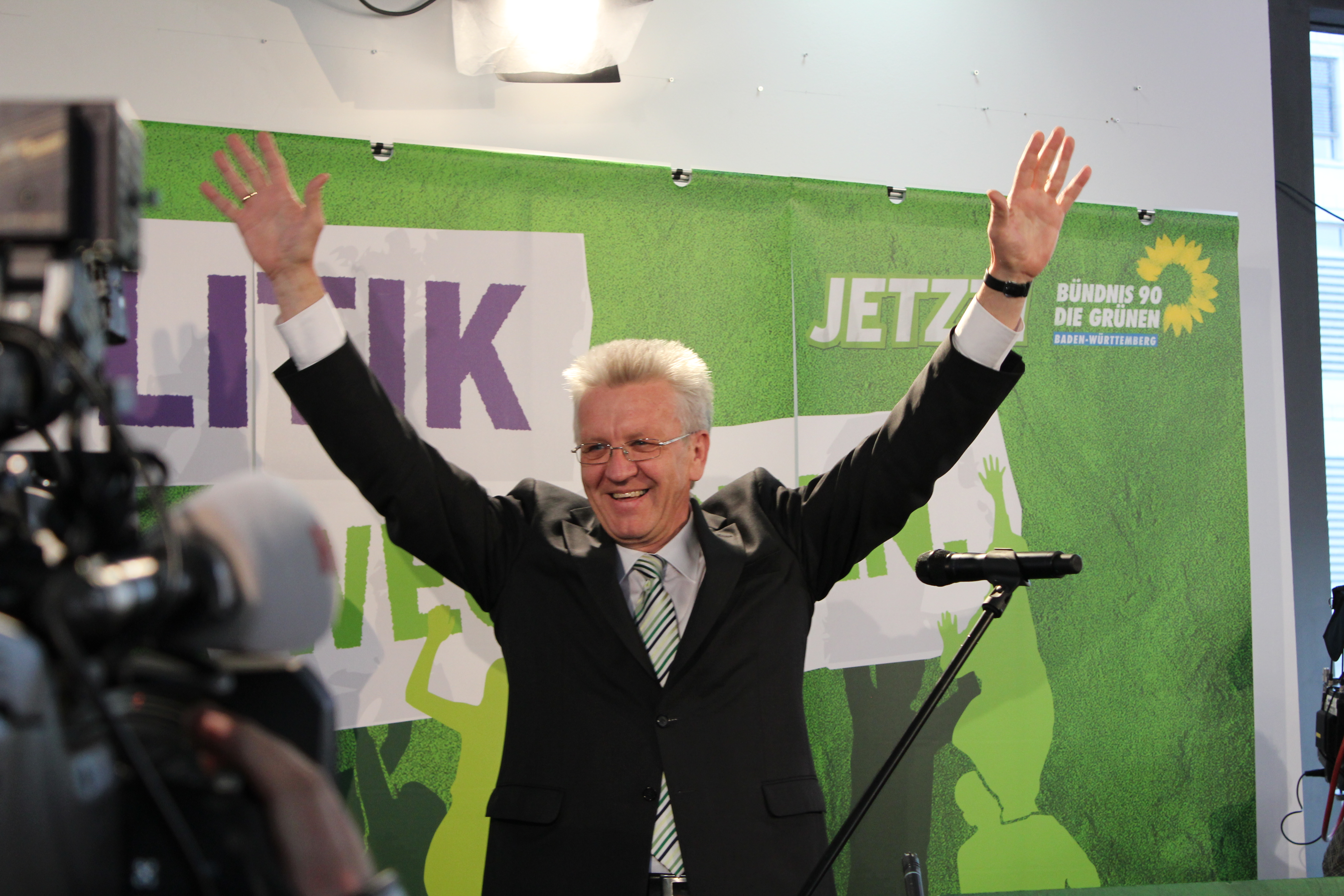
Winfried Kretschmann

The Green Party of Baden-Württemberg was founded on 30 September 1979 in Sindelfingen, emerging from various citizens’ movements, especially the strong anti-nuclear protests around the planned Wyhl nuclear power plant. In 1980 the party entered the state parliament for the first time with 5.3%, marking the first time Greens won seats in a parliament of a German non-city state.

Throughout the 1980s the party was shaped by internal debates between its fundamentalist and pragmatic wings, with leading figures such as Winfried Kretschmann and Fritz Kuhn strengthening the realist camp over time. By the end of the decade, the pragmatists had largely prevailed.

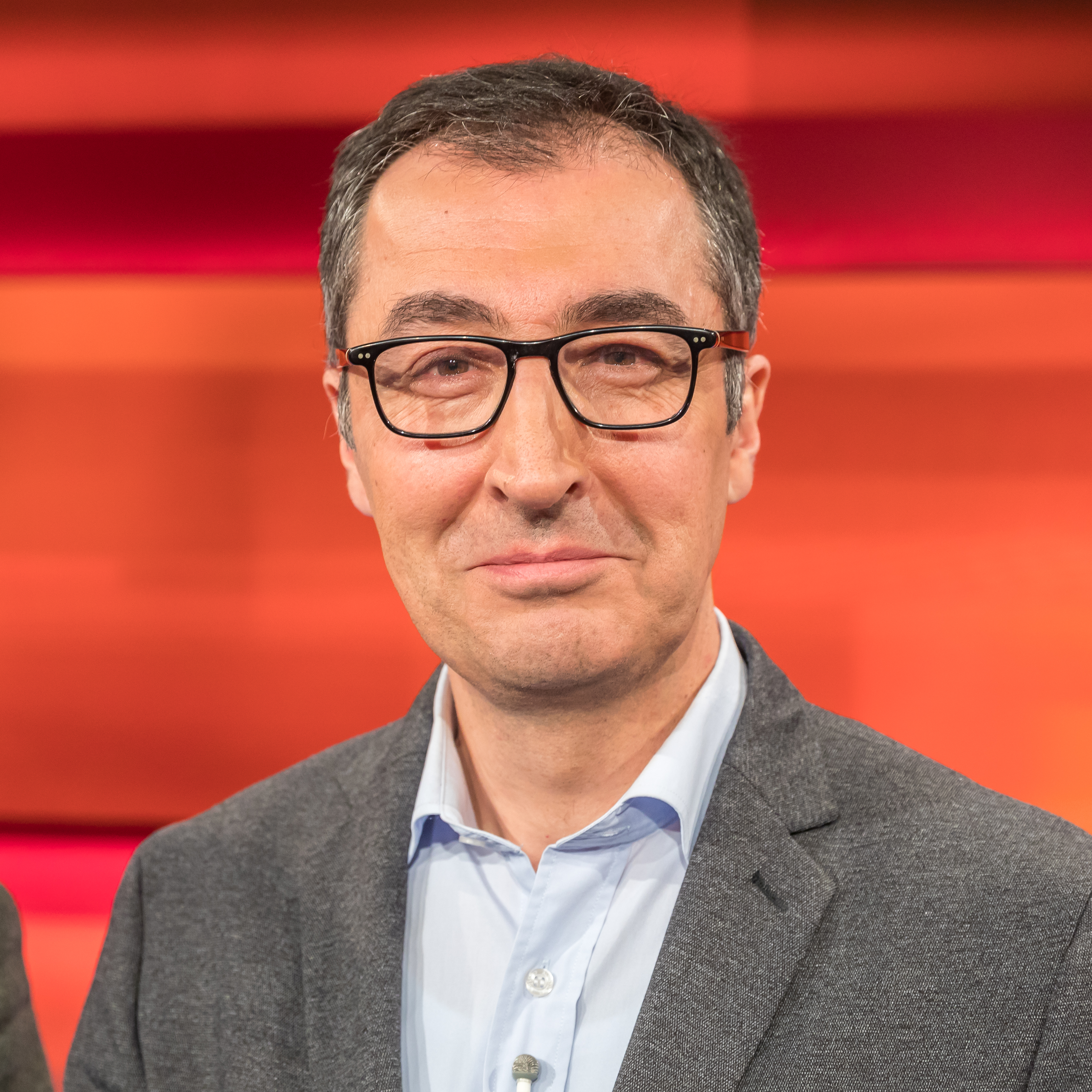
Cem Özdemir

The Greens steadily increased their influence at the municipal level and achieved notable successes in the 1990s, including 12.1% in the 1996 state election. The party played a major role in the protests against the Stuttgart 21 rail project and secured 24.2% in the 2011 state election. On 12 May 2011, Winfried Kretschmann became the first Green minister-president in Germany, leading a Green–Red government. Since 2016 the Greens have been the strongest party in the state, achieving 32.6% in the 2021 election.

Several cities in Baden-Württemberg have been governed by Green mayors, including Freiburg, Konstanz, Tübingen and Stuttgart.

Cem Özdemir was the party's top candidate for the 2026 state election, at which the Greens slightly lowered their seat and vote shares but nonetheless finished first. Özdemir became Baden-Württemberg's next minister-president, and the first one of Turkish descent in any state.

== Chairpersons ==
| Period | Spokespersons / Chairpersons |
| March 1991 – July 1992 | Dagmar Dehmer and Fritz Kuhn |
| July 1992 – April 1993 | Dagmar Dehmer and Winfried Hermann |
| May 1993 – April 1997 | Barbara Graf and Winfried Hermann |
| April 1997 – April 1999 | Monika Schnaitmann and Reinhard Bütikofer |
| April 1999 – June 2001 | Monika Schnaitmann and Andreas Braun |
| June 2001 – June 2003 | Renate Thon and Andreas Braun |
| June 2003 – December 2005 | Sylvia Kotting-Uhl and Andreas Braun |
| December 2005 – November 2006 | Petra Selg and Andreas Braun |
| November 2006 – November 2009 | Petra Selg and Daniel Mouratidis |
| November 2009 – October 2011 | Silke Krebs and Christian Kühn |
| October 2011 – November 2013 | Thekla Walker and Christian Kühn |
| November 2013 – November 2016 | Thekla Walker and Oliver Hildenbrand |
| November 2016 – December 2021 | Sandra Detzer and Oliver Hildenbrand |
| since December 2021 | Lena Schwelling and Pascal Haggenmüller |

== Election results ==
Results of state elections
| Year | Vote share | Seats |
|---|---|---|
| 1980 | 5.3% | 6 |
| 1984 | 8.0% | 9 |
| 1988 | 7.9% | 10 |
| 1992 | 9.5% | 13 |
| 1996 | 12.1% | 19 |
| 2001 | 7.7% | 10 |
| 2006 | 11.7% | 17 |
| 2011 | 24.2% | 36 |
| 2016 | 30.3% | 47 |
| 2021 | 32.6% | 58 |
| 2026 | 30.2% | 56 |
