= Nicolas Zippelius =

German politician

Nicolas Zippelius MdB

Member of the Bundestag; for Karlsruhe-Land
- Incumbent
- Assumed office 26 October 2021
- Preceded by: Axel Fischer

Personal details
- Born: 1 August 1987 (age 39) Karlsruhe, West Germany
- Party: Christian Democratic Union
- Education: Leibniz University Hannover; Goethe University Frankfurt

Nicolas Zippelius (born 1 August 1987) is a German politician of the Christian Democratic Union (CDU) who has been serving as a member of the Bundestag since 2021.

== Early life and education ==
Zippelius was born in the West German city of Karlsruhe and studied political science in Hanover and Frankfurt.

== Political career ==
Zippelius was elected directly to the Bundestag the 2021 elections, representing the Karlsruhe-Land district.

In parliament, Zippelius has since been serving on the Committee on Economic Cooperation and Development and the Committee on Digital Affairs. Since the 2025 elections, he has been his parliamentary group’s spokesperson on economic cooperation and development as well as on bilateral relations with China.

In the negotiations to form a coalition government under the leadership of Cem Özdemir following the 2026 state elections in Baden-Württemberg, Zippelius co-chaired the working group on administrative modernization, alongside Jörg Krauss.

== Other activities ==
- GIZ, Member of the Board of Trustees (since 2025)
