= Heiner Studer =

Swiss politician

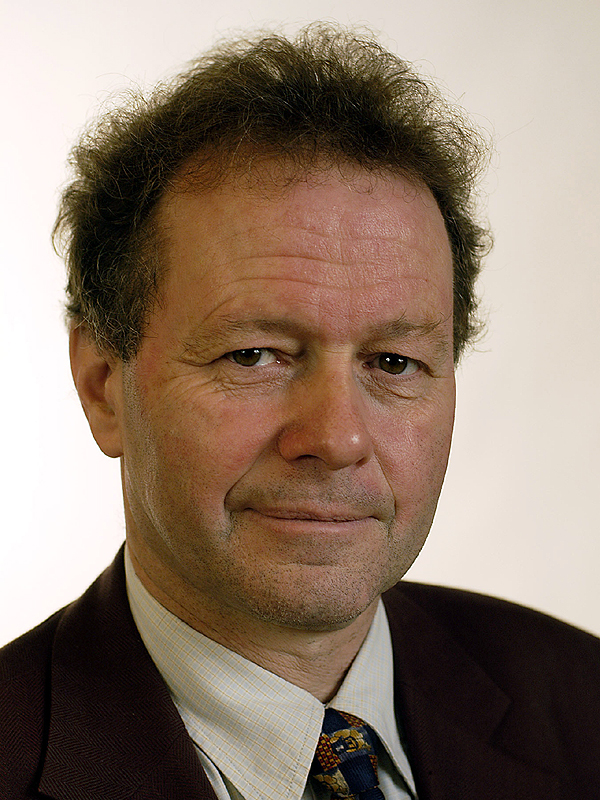
- Official portrait, 2007

Member of the National Council (Switzerland)
- In office 6 December 1999 – 2 December 2007
- Constituency: Canton of Aargau

Member of the Grand Council of Aargau
- In office 1973–1998

Personal details
- Born: Heiner Studer; May 16, 1949 (age 77) Baden, Aargau, Switzerland
- Party: Evangelical People's Party
- Spouse: Marit Andestad (m. 1974)
- Children: 3, including Lilian
- Occupation: Lay preacher, civil servant, politician
- Website: Official website

Heiner Studer (/stuːdər/; stood-er born 16 May 1949) is a Swiss lay preacher, civil servant and former politician who previously served on the National Council (Switzerland) from 1999 to 2007 for the Evangelical People's Party. He previously also served on the Grand Council of Aargau from 1973 to 1998. His daughter, Lilian Studer, currently also serves on the National Council (Switzerland) since 2019.

== Early life and education ==
Studer was born 16 May 1949 in Baden, Aargau, Switzerland and was raised in Wettingen where he attended local schools. In 1969, he completed his commercial maturity, and initially studied a couple semesters of Law and Economics, but did not complete his degree.

== Career ==
Studer started his career in a political environment; in 1970 he became the general secretary of the Evangelical People's Party and in 1976 general secretary of the Swiss Association of Evangelical Workers and Employers. In 1984, Studer was appointed general secretary of International Blue Cross for German-speaking Switzerland, and he served as their managing director and central secretary until 2001.

== Politics ==
From 1973 to 1998, Studer was a member of the Grand Council of Aargau (legislature), where in 1997 at the age of 48 he became the youngest president (longest-serving) in parliamentary history. At the same time, from 1974 to 1985 he was on the municipal council of Wettingen. He was subsequently elected into the executive in 1986 and served as vice mayor there from 1994 to 2013 (part-time deputy mayor). In the 1999 Swiss federal election he was elected to the National Council (Switzerland) for the Evangelical People's Party, where he was a member of the Foreign Policy Committee and the Committee for Science, Education and Culture. In 2007, he was not reelected, and resigned from public office. He served as president of the Evangelical People's Party from 2008 to 2014.

== Personal life ==
Studer married Norwegian-born Marit Andestad in 1974 in Norway. The ceremony was officiated by Kjell Magne Bondevik, who would later serve as Prime Minister of Norway, from 1997 to 2000 and 2001 to 2005. They have three daughters, including Lilian Studer, who serves on the National Council (Switzerland) as well since 2019.
