= Gottfried Leonhard =

German politician (1895–1983)

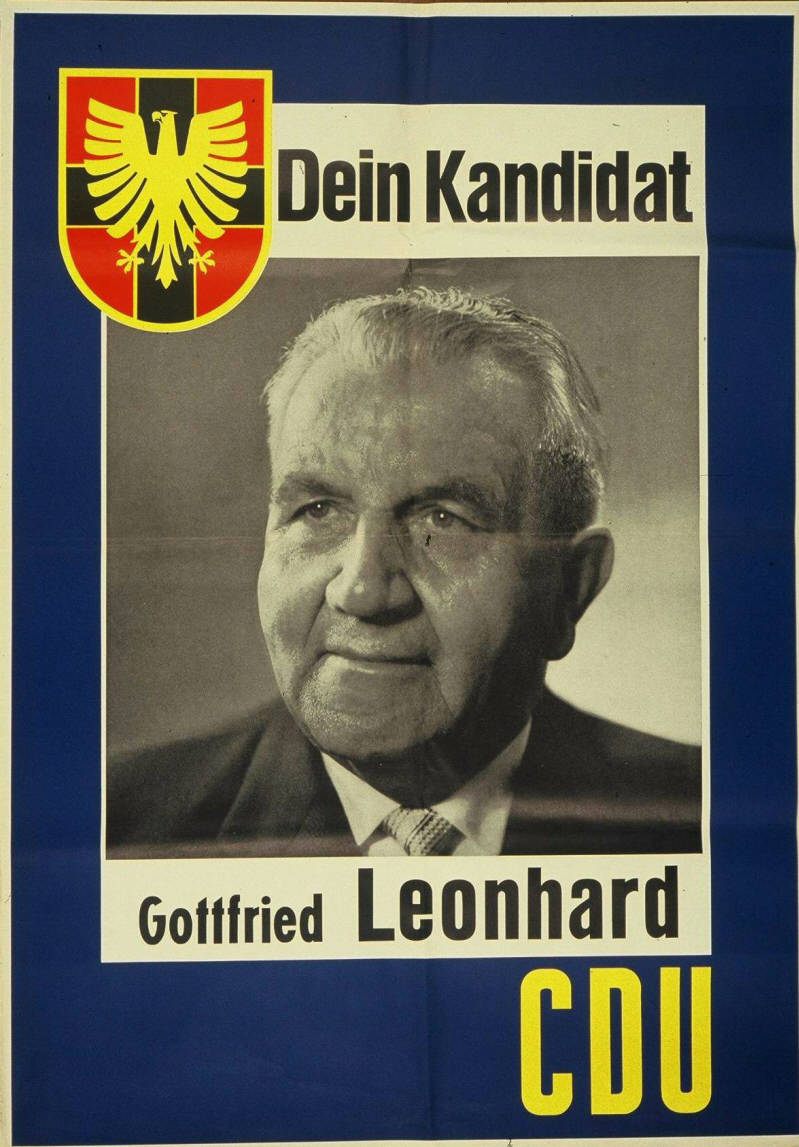
- Gottfried Leonhard on a campaign poster for the 1957 federal elections

Member of the Bundestag; for Karlsruhe-Land
- In office 7 September 1949 – 17 October 1965
- Preceded by: Constituency established
- Succeeded by: Constituency abolished

Personal details
- Born: 14 March 1895 Nöttingen, Grand Duchy of Baden, German Empire
- Died: 7 October 1983 (aged 88) Pforzheim, Baden-Württemberg, West Germany
- Party: Christian Democratic Union

Gottfried Leonhard (14 March 1895 – 7 October 1983) was a German politician of the Christian Democratic Union (CDU) and member of the German Bundestag.

== Life ==
Leonhard was a co-founder of the CDU in Pforzheim in 1945 and was at times the district chairman of the CDU there. After the Second World War, he was initially a member of the city council of Pforzheim. He was a member of the state parliament of Württemberg-Baden for constituency 24 (Pforzheim) from 1946 to 1950.

Leonhard was a member of the German Bundestag from 1949 to 1965 and represented the constituency of Karlsruhe-Land as a directly elected member. From 21 May 1953 until the end of the first legislative period, he was deputy chairman of the Bundestag Committee for Postal and Telecommunications Affairs.

== Literature ==
Herbst, Ludolf; Jahn, Bruno (2002). Vierhaus, Rudolf (ed.). Biographisches Handbuch der Mitglieder des Deutschen Bundestages. 1949–2002 [Biographical Handbook of the Members of the German Bundestag. 1949–2002] (in German). München: De Gruyter - De Gruyter Saur. p. 1715. ISBN 978-3-11-184511-1.
