= Silke Krebs =

German politician (born 1966)

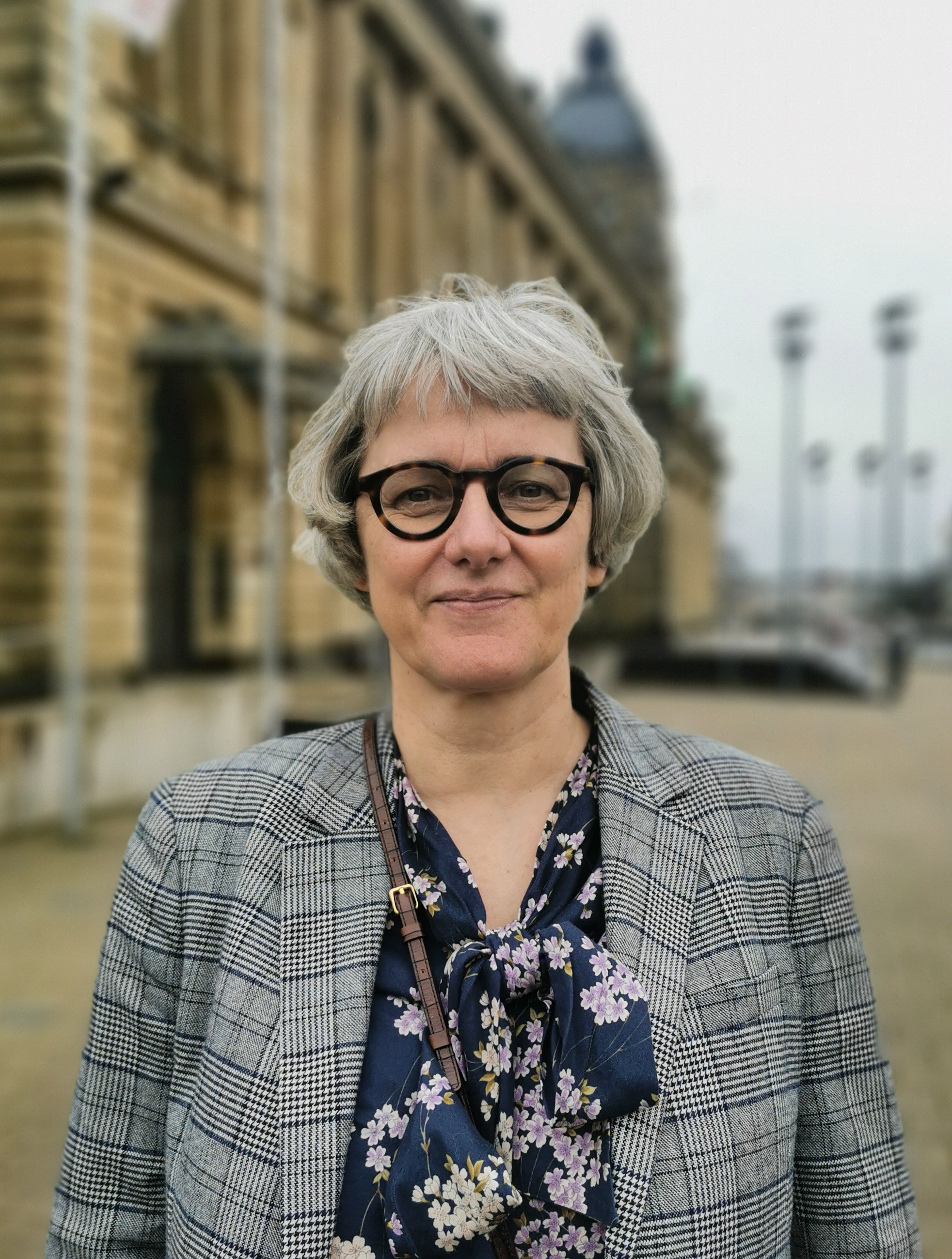
- Krebs in 2023

Minister of the State Ministry of Baden-Württemberg
- In office 12 May 2011 – 18 March 2016
- Minister-President: Winfried Kretschmann
- Preceded by: Helmut Rau
- Succeeded by: Klaus-Peter Murawski

Personal details
- Born: 23 March 1966 (age 60) Aschaffenburg
- Party: Alliance 90/The Greens

Silke Krebs (born 23 March 1966 in Aschaffenburg) is a German politician serving as state secretary for economic affairs, industry, climate action and energy of North Rhine-Westphalia since 2022. From 2019 to 2022, she served as state secretary of finance of Bremen. From 2011 to 2016, she served as minister of the state ministry of Baden-Württemberg. From 2009 to 2011, she served as chairwoman of Alliance 90/The Greens Baden-Württemberg.
