= Lilian Studer =

Swiss politician (born 1977)

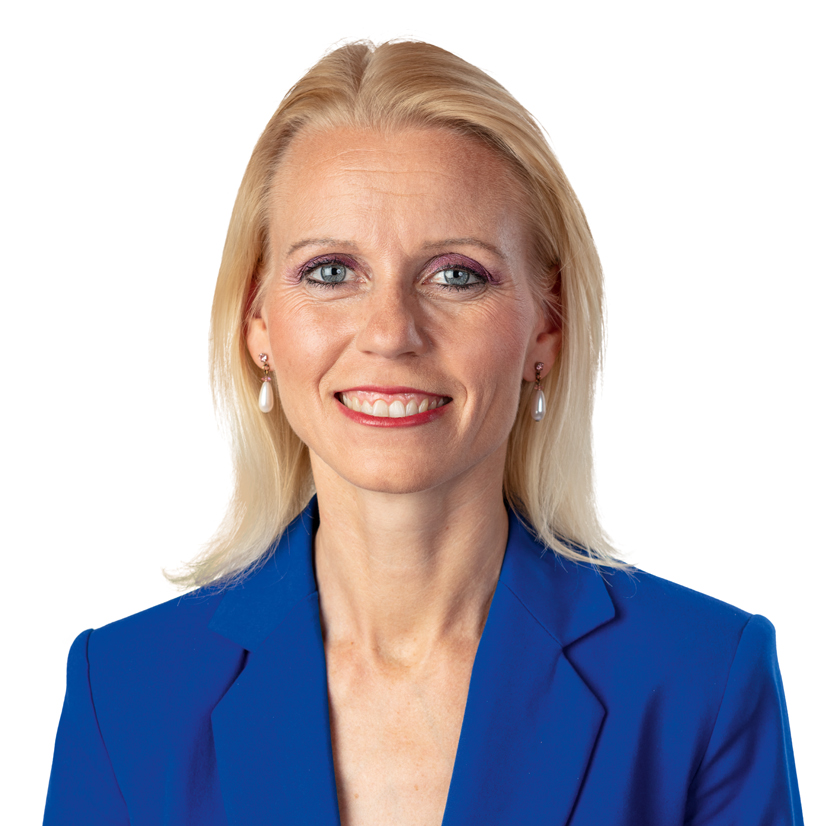
- Lilian Studer (2019)

Member of the National Council (Switzerland)
- In office 2 December 2019 – 4 December 2023

Member of the Grand Council of Aargau
- In office 2002–2019
- Preceded by: Elsbeth Zimmermann
- Succeeded by: Lutz Fischer-Lamprecht

Personal details
- Born: Lilian Studer; December 20, 1977 (age 48) Baden, Aargau, Switzerland
- Relations: Heiner Studer (father)
- Website: lilianstuder.ch (in German)

Lilian Studer (born 20 December 1977) is a Swiss politician. She currently serves as a member of the National Council (Switzerland) for the Evangelical People's Party since 2 December 2019. Since 2021, she also serves as the president of the Evangelical People's Party of Switzerland.

== Early life and education ==
Studer was born on 20 December 1977, in Baden, Switzerland to Heiner and Marit (née Andestad) Studer. Her father was also a former member of the National Council (Switzerland) between 1999 and 2007, and a former member of the Grand Council of Aargau. Her mother is from Norway. Studer is a Swiss-Norwegian dual citizen. She was raised in Wettingen and became a teacher for textile handcrafts at local secondary schools. In 2000, she volunteered in Honduras, before becoming a teacher at the Dietikon schools.

== Career ==
Between 2001 and 2012, Studer worked as a teacher for textile handcrafts at the local schools in Wettingen. Studer was the managing director of Blaues Kreuz Aargau between 2014 and 2021. Since 2021 she has been the president of the Evangelical People's Party of Switzerland.

== Politics ==
In 2002, Studer was elected into the Grand Council of Aargau, succeeding Elsbeth Zimmermann. Studer was ultimately elected into the National Council (Switzerland) in the 2019 Swiss federal election on 20 October 2019. She assumed office on 2 December 2019.
