= Oberderdingen =

- Town
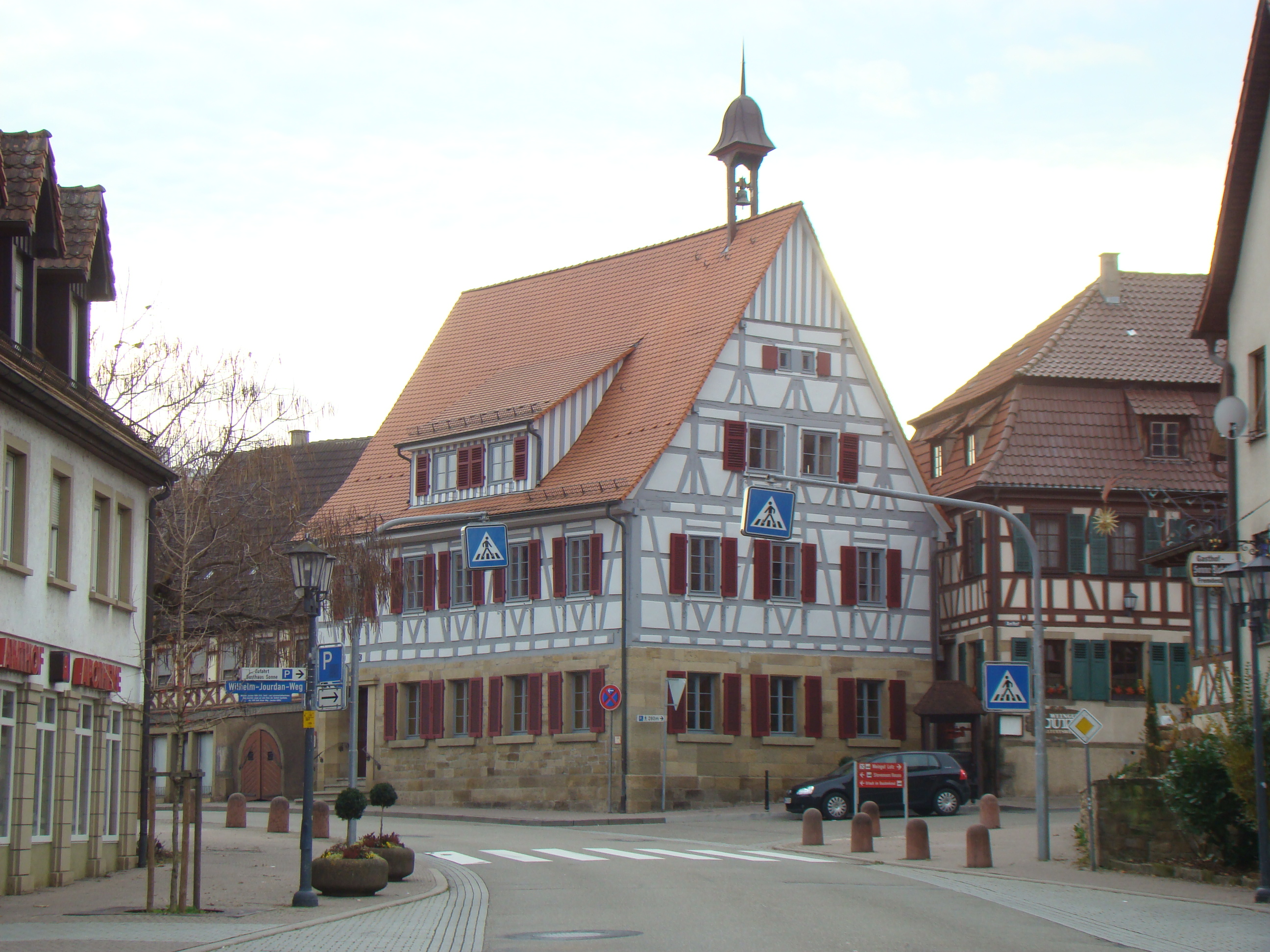
- Old town hall

- Coat of arms

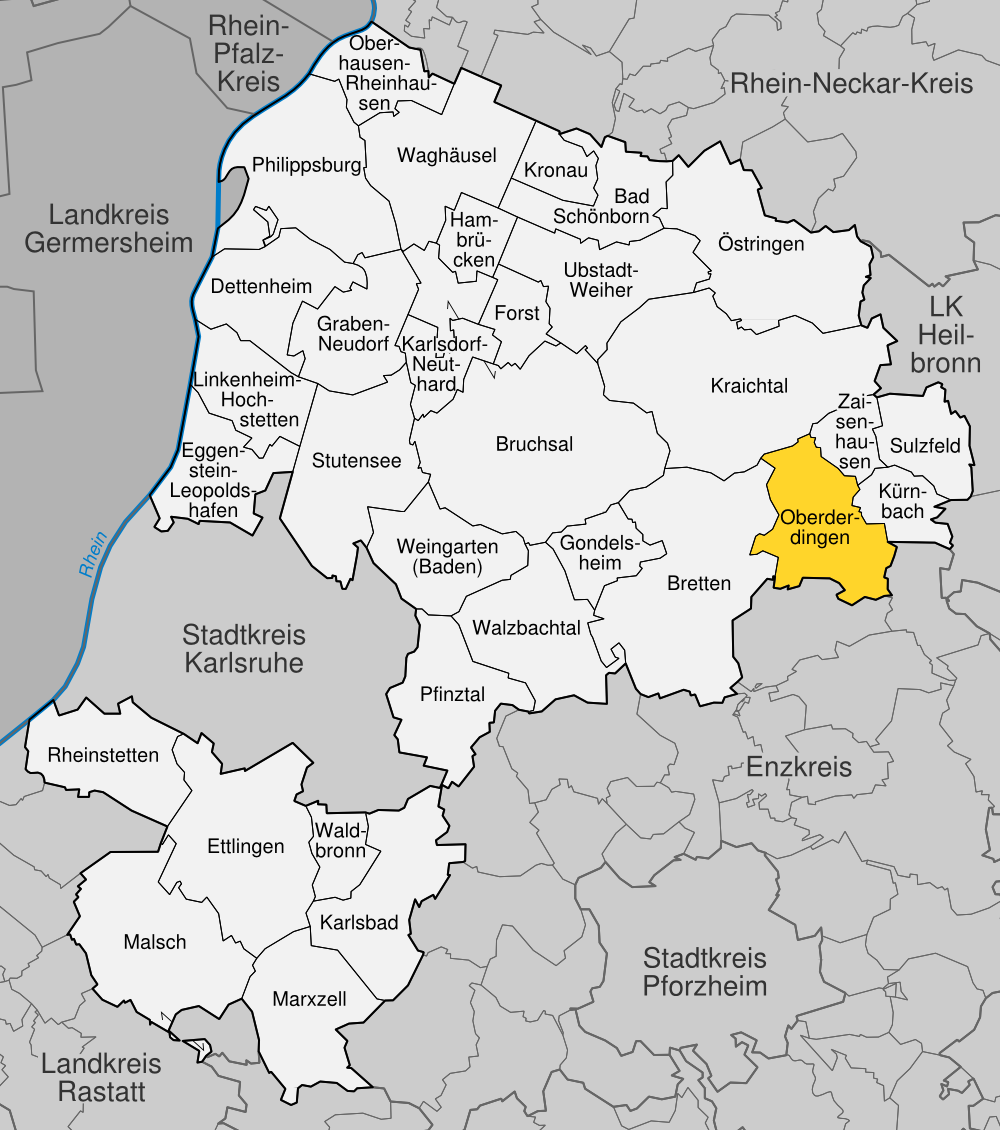
- Location of Oberderdingen within Karlsruhe district
- Interactive map of Oberderdingen
- Location within Germany Location within Baden-Württemberg
- Coordinates: 49°03′45″N 08°48′07″E
- Country: Germany
- State: Baden-Württemberg
- Admin. region: Karlsruhe
- District: Karlsruhe

Government
  - Mayor (2019–27): Thomas Nowitzki

Area
  - Total: 33.57 km^{2} (12.96 sq mi)
- Elevation: 190 m (620 ft)

Population (2025-12-31)
  - Total: 11,753
  - Density: 350.1/km^{2} (906.8/sq mi)
- Time zone: UTC+01:00 (CET)
  - Summer (DST): UTC+02:00 (CEST)
- Postal codes: 75032–75038
- Dialling codes: 07045, 07258
- Vehicle registration: KA, VAI
- Website: www.oberderdingen.de

Oberderdingen (German pronunciation: [oːbɐˈdɛʁdɪŋən]) is a town in the Karlsruhe district of Baden-Württemberg, southwestern Germany. It is located about 30 km east of Karlsruhe and 32 km west of Heilbronn. The town lies within the Kraichgau region, known for its rolling hills and vineyards.

Area: 33.57 km^{2}

Elevation: 190 m above sea level

Population (2023): 11,721

== Geography ==
Oberderdingen is nestled between the Stromberg and Heuchelberg hills, surrounded by forests and agricultural land. The climate is temperate, suitable for viticulture and other agricultural activities.

== History ==
The town's history dates back to at least 1260, when it was mentioned in the Herrenalb Charter for a vineyard in Terdingen. The Herrenalb Monastery, constructed in 1267, highlights the historical significance of the area.

== Economy and Agriculture ==
Oberderdingen is well known for wine production, particularly within the Stromberg-Heckengäu wine region. Viticulture has been practiced since at least 1227. Traditional houses often include underground cellars used for storing wine.

== Landmarks and Attractions ==
St. Peter and St. Paul Church: A Gothic-style church built in the 13th or 14th century, renovated in the 18th century in Baroque style.

Flehningen Water Castle: A Renaissance-era castle in the Flehningen district, formerly the seat of the Flehningen family.

The Guardhouse: Built in 1772 at the entrance of Amthof, it is a protected architectural landmark.

St. Laurentius Church: Constructed between 1571 and 1574, it is one of the oldest Protestant churches in Württemberg.

Old School: Built in 1891/92, used as a school until 1945, now functioning as a conference center known as the Oberderdingen Forum.

== Culture and Events ==
Oberderdingen hosts various cultural events throughout the year, including the Christmas market at Schlossplatz and the “Derdinger Herbst” festival celebrating local traditions and community spirit.

== Transport ==
The town is accessible via dialing codes 07045 and 07258 and falls under the vehicle registration areas KA (Karlsruhe) and VAI (Vaihingen an der Enz).

== Notable residents ==
Matthias Blankenbaker: Early settler in Virginia, USA, married in Oberderdingen, reflecting the town's historical connections to emigration.
