= Pascal Haggenmüller =

German politician (born 1988)

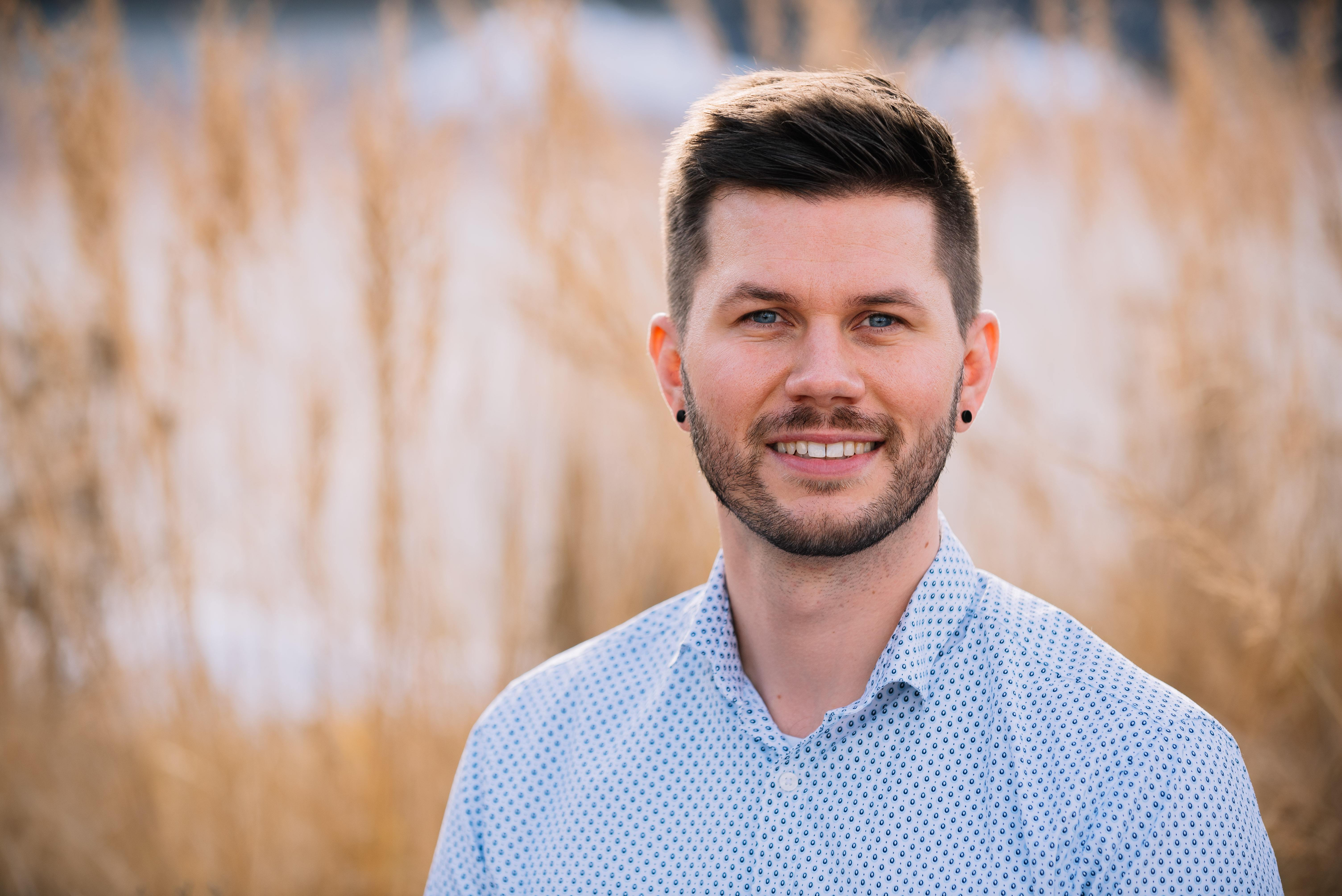
- Haggenmüller in 2021

Member of the Landtag of Baden-Württemberg
- Incumbent
- Assumed office 11 May 2026

Personal details
- Born: 5 October 1988 (age 37)
- Party: Alliance 90/The Greens (since 2006)

Pascal Haggenmüller (born 5 October 1988) is a German politician who was elected member of the Landtag of Baden-Württemberg in 2026. He has served as co-chairman of the Alliance 90/The Greens Baden-Württemberg since 2021.
