= Karlsruhe University of Applied Sciences =

Public university in Karlsruhe, Germany

Coordinates: 49°00′56″N 8°23′27″E

- Hochschule Karlsruhe - HKA
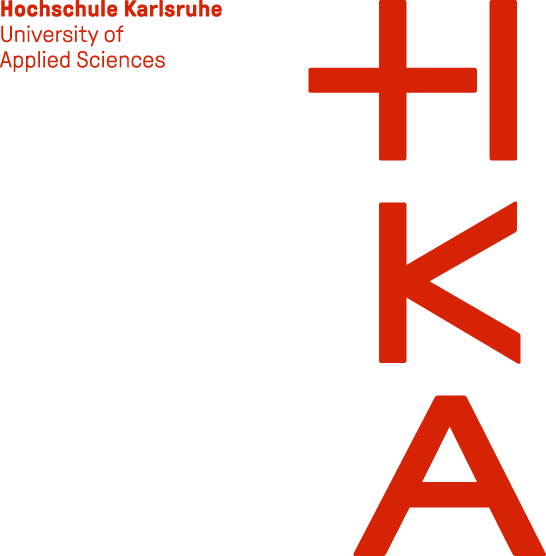
- Type: public higher education institution
- Established: 1878
- Rector: Prof. Dr. Rose Marie Beck
- Administrative staff: 452
- Students: 7000 (approx)
- Location: Karlsruhe, Baden-Württemberg, Germany
- Campus: Urban
- Nickname: HKA
- Website: www.h-ka.de

With around 7,000 students, Karlsruhe University of Applied Sciences (Hochschule Karlsruhe - HKA) is the second largest university of applied sciences in the German federal state of Baden-Württemberg (as of winter semester 2022/2023). It is a founding member of the Doctoral Association of Universities of Applied Sciences Baden-Württemberg established in 2022 and a member of the INGENIUM European University.

== Study Programs ==
The study programs cover engineering, computer science and business management disciplines and lead to Bachelor's and Master's degrees. As the first professional qualification, the Bachelor's degree can be obtained after a standard period of study of seven semesters, the Master's degree after a further three semesters. These degrees were introduced at Karlsruhe University of Applied Sciences in 1999 as part of the Bologna reform.

Laboratory exercises, practical semesters and final theses, which are usually completed in industry, form part of the curricula. Research activities have been increasingly integrated into several degree courses since 2000, and some degree courses are considered research-oriented.

== Faculties ==
Karlsruhe University of Applied Sciences comprises the following six faculties:

- Architecture and Civil Engineering
- Electrical Engineering and IT
- Computer Science and Business Information Systems
- Information Management and Media
- Mechanical Engineering and Mechatronics
- Management Science and Engineering

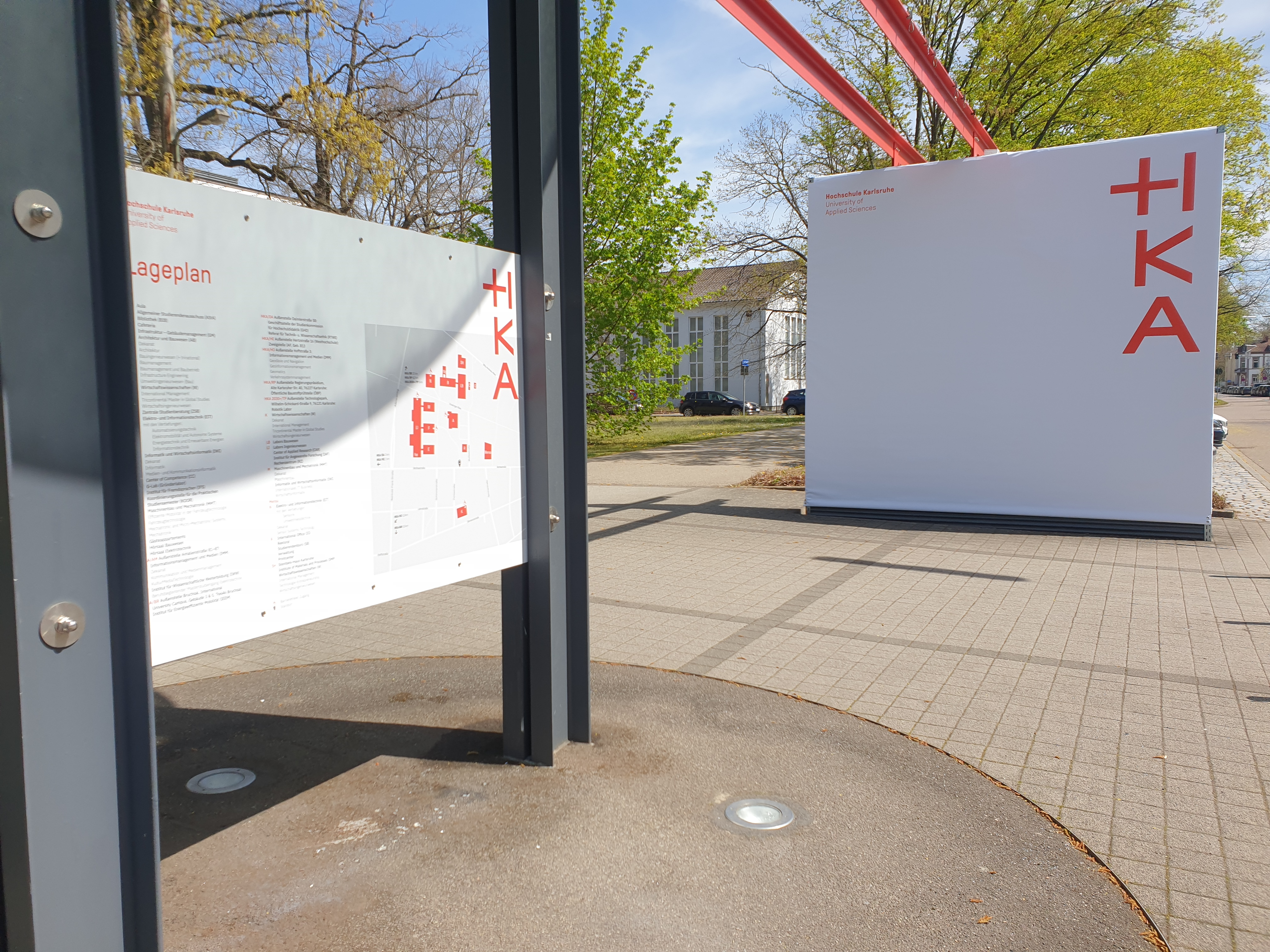
HKA entry portal

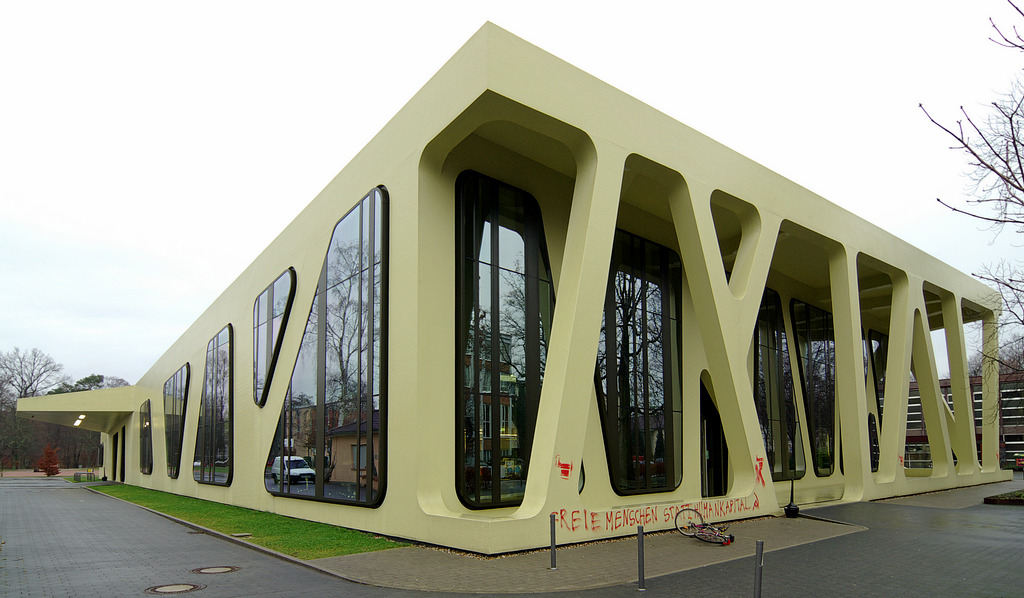
„Mensa Moltke“ student canteen, completed in 2007 based on a design by Jürgen Mayer

== International contacts ==
The university cooperates with around 180 partner universities world-wide. International contacts are managed centrally by the university's International Office. Semesters abroad are possible through exchange programs.

Partnerships with foreign universities are also used to plan and carry out international research projects, and guest lecturers are invited to give lectures. The Bachelor's program Electrical Engineering and Information Technology and the Master's programs Sensor Systems Technology and Tricontinental Master in Global Studies are taught entirely in English, while the Master's program Geomatics is mainly taught in English. Together with partner universities in France and Switzerland, the trinational Bachelor's and Master's degree course in Civil Engineering is also offered, leading to a French and a Swiss university degree in addition to a German one. Numerous other international double or multiple degree programs at Bachelor's or Master's level are offered in cooperation with partner universities in Argentina, France, India, Canada, Malaysia, Scotland, Spain and Taiwan.

The 4-semester ERASMUS Mundus Master's degree program Mechatronic and Micro-Mechatronic Systems (EU4M) started for the first time in the winter semester 2008/09 and takes place at three European universities in Spain, France and Germany. Students can deepen their knowledge of mechatronics and micro-mechatronics and learn the language and culture of the other countries.

In 2023, HKA joined forces with nine partner universities in Bulgaria, Finland, France, Greece, Ireland, Italy, Romania, Sweden and Spain to form the "INGENIUM European University".

== Applied Research ==
HKA receives the largest amount of third-party funding for research amongst the universities of applied sciences in the state of Baden-Württemberg. The focus is on application-oriented research and development projects. The expansion of practice-oriented research is a strategic goal of the university.

In September 2019, the efeuAkademie was launched by the Institute for Energy Efficient Mobility. As part of the EU-funded flagship project efeuCampus[8], the efeuAkademie represents a communicative interface between the project partners and the general public. To this end, it offers regular information events and presents solutions on the topic of smart cities.

In 2020, the Baden-Württemberg Institute for Sustainable Mobility was opened at HKA.

=== Research institutes ===
HKA comprises the following central research institutes:

- Institute of Applied Research
- Institute of Data-Centric Software Systems
- Institute for Digital Materials Science
- Institute of Energy Efficient Mobility
- Institute for Intelligent Interaction and Immersive Experience
- Intelligent Systems Research Group Institute
- Institute of Refrigeration, Air-Conditioning and Environmental Engineering
- Institute for Learning and Innovation in Networks
- Institute of Materials and Processes
- Institute for Sensor and Information Systems
- Institute for Thermo-Fluid Dynamics
- Institute for Transport Systems and Infrastructure
- Institute for Robotics and Autonomous Systems

== Cooperations ==
Within the Karlsruhe Technology Region, the university cooperates with the KIT (the merger of the University of Karlsruhe (TH) and the Karlsruhe Research Center), including a joint graduate college and the link-up of the HKA library to the KIT library. There are also close contacts with the Fraunhofer Institute of Optronics, System Technologies and Image Exploitation (IOSB, formerly IITB) and the Federal Waterways Engineering and Research Institute in Karlsruhe.
