= Axel Fischer =

German politician

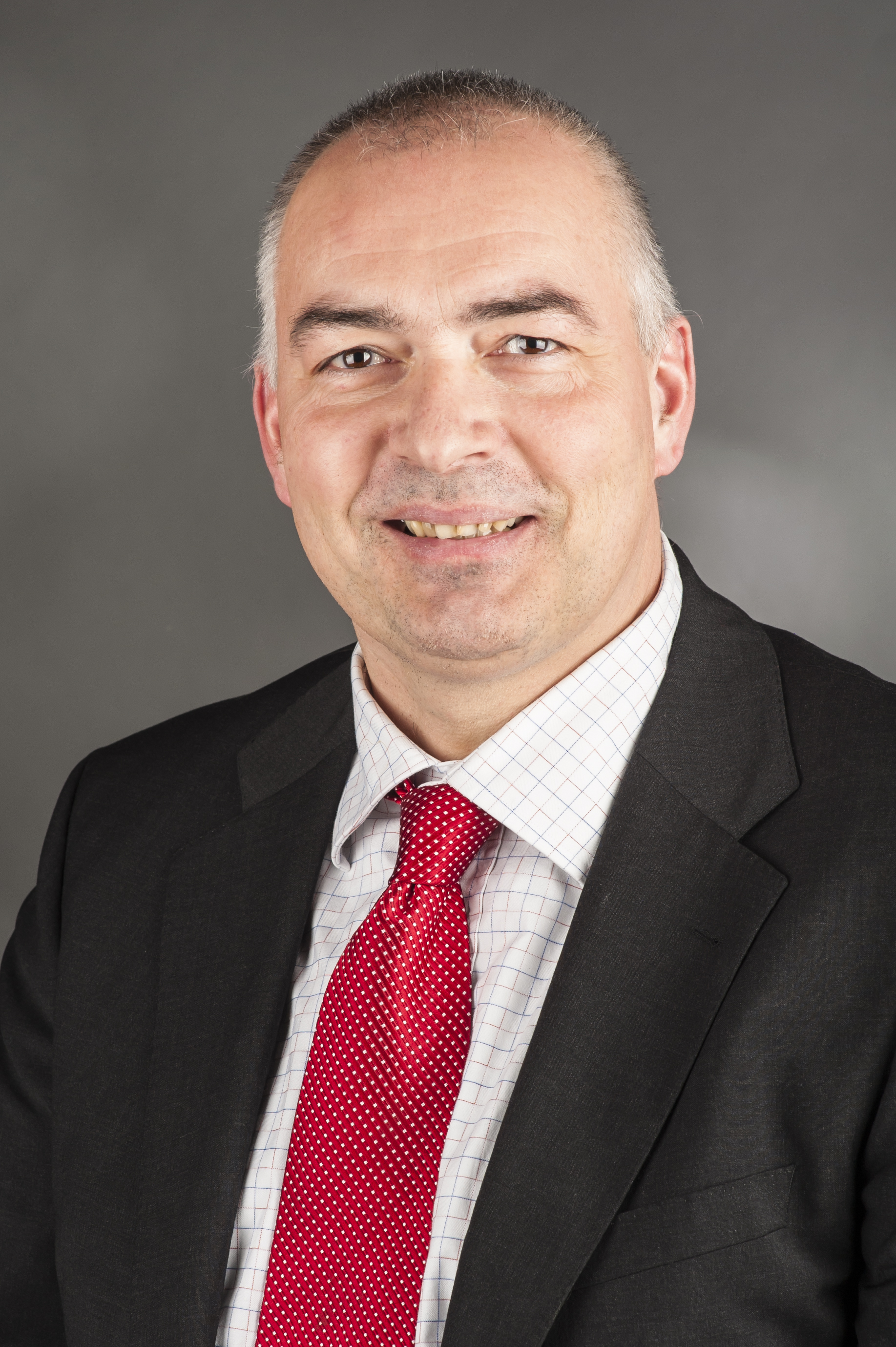
- Fischer in 2014

Member of the Bundestag; from Baden-Württemberg
- In office 26 October 1998 – 26 October 2021
- Preceded by: Multi-member district
- Succeeded by: Nicolas Zippelius
- Constituency: State list (1998–2002); Karlsruhe-Land (2002–2021)

Personal details
- Born: 5 May 1966 (age 60) Karlsruhe, West Germany
- Party: Christian Democratic Union
- Children: 6
- Parent: Werner Fischer (father)
- Relatives: Lutz Fischer (brother)
- Education: University of Karlsruhe

Axel Eduard Fischer (born 5 May 1966) is a German politician. He is a member of the CDU and was a member of the Bundestag from 1998 to October 2021, representing Karlsruhe-Land since 2002. In early 2026 he was found guilty by a court in Munich of having accepted payments in order to campaign for the Azerbaijani government during his involvement with the Parliamentary Assembly of the Council of Europe.

== Early life and education ==
From 1989 until 1995, Fischer studied mechanical engineering at the University of Karlsruhe.

== Political career ==
In parliament, Fischer first served on the Committee on Education, Research and Technology Assessment from 1998 until 2009. From the 2009 elections, he was a member of the Budget Committee and the Audit Committee. In this capacity, he served as rapporteur on the annual budget of the Federal Ministry of Labour and Social Affairs (BMAS) and the Federal Employment Agency (BA). He was also a member of the German Parliament's Berlin-Taipei Parliamentary Circle of Friends.

In addition to his committee assignments, Fischer was member of the German delegation to the Parliamentary Assembly of the Council of Europe (PACE) from 2010 until 2018. In 2009, he succeeded Edward O'Hara as chairman of the Committee on Technology and Aerospace. He also served as rapporteur on Armenia from 2011 until 2014 (alongside John Prescott and later Alan Meale) and on Ukraine in 2017. From 2014 until 2018, he was one of the Assembly's vice-presidents.

Following the 2017 German federal election, the CDU/CSU parliamentary group decided against including Fischer in its list of nominees for Germany's new 18 person-strong delegation to PACE; the decision has been linked in media reports to his alleged role in limiting PACE's efforts to hold the Azerbaijan government under Ilham Aliyev accountable for human rights abuses as well as possible corruption.

In early 2020, Fischer co-founded an informal cross-party group of MPs from the CDU, CSU and FDP parties who opposed a potential coalition government between CDU/CSU and the Green Party.

By March 2021, the CDU/CSU parliamentary group's leadership announced that Fischer would be replaced as chair of the Audit Committee. He was succeeded by Carsten Körber.

In October 2021, Fischer no longer ran as a candidate for Bundestag for the 2021 German federal election.

== Other activities ==
- European Security and Defense Association (ESDA), Vice President
- World League for Freedom and Democracy (WLFD), President of the German chapter

== Political positions ==
In response to the Greek government-debt crisis, Fischer and Rüdiger Kruse proposed in 2015 that German holidaymakers whose holiday spending helps boost the Greek economy should be reimbursed 500 euros by the German state on their return, on condition that the hotel and restaurants they visited have paid their taxes.

In June 2017, Fischer voted against Germany's introduction of same-sex marriage.

== Controversy and Corruption charges ==
In 2017, the Union parliamentary group withdrew Fischer's appointment to the new Bundestag delegation at the Council of Europe because of his implication in the "Caviar Diplomacy" corruption scandal in PACE.

In March 2021, Fischer became the subject of an investigation over allegations that he took payments for political activity in the interests of the Azerbaijani government. On 4 March 2021, following a request from the Munich Public Prosecutor's Office, the German Bundestag lifted Fischer's parliamentary immunity. Subsequently, the BKA conducted a search at his parliamentary office in relation to the public prosecutor's investigation, on the initial suspicion of corruption, into payments from the "Azerbaijani Laundromat" money-laundering scheme to active and former members of the Bundestag for lobbying activities to promote Azerbaijani interests at the Council of Europe.

In January 2024, German prosecutors brought bribery and corruption charges against Axel Fischer and Eduard Lintner (another CDU member implicated in the Azerbaijani laundromat). He failed to appear at his court hearings and checked into a private clinic in Bad Säckingen instead. Since he was unable to produce a medical certificate, an examination by a court-appointed doctor was ordered mid December 2025. Fischer was found fit to stand trial, so the Oberlandesgericht Munich issued a warrant for his arrest and he was taken into custody on 22 December 2025. In january 2026 the court found Fischer guilty and sentecend him to one and a half years. The sentence was suspended. Additionally, Axel Fischer is not allowed to run as a candidate in elections for two years and has to donate Euro 12,000 to the Opferhilfe NGO.

== Personal life ==
Fischer is married for the second time and has six children. His father is the former President of the University of Applied Sciences in Karlsruhe Werner Fischer and one of his brothers is the Swiss politician and pastor Lutz Fischer-Lamprecht.
