= Tonwaren-Industrie Wiesloch =

Coordinates: 49.2960°N 8.6680°E

TIW AG
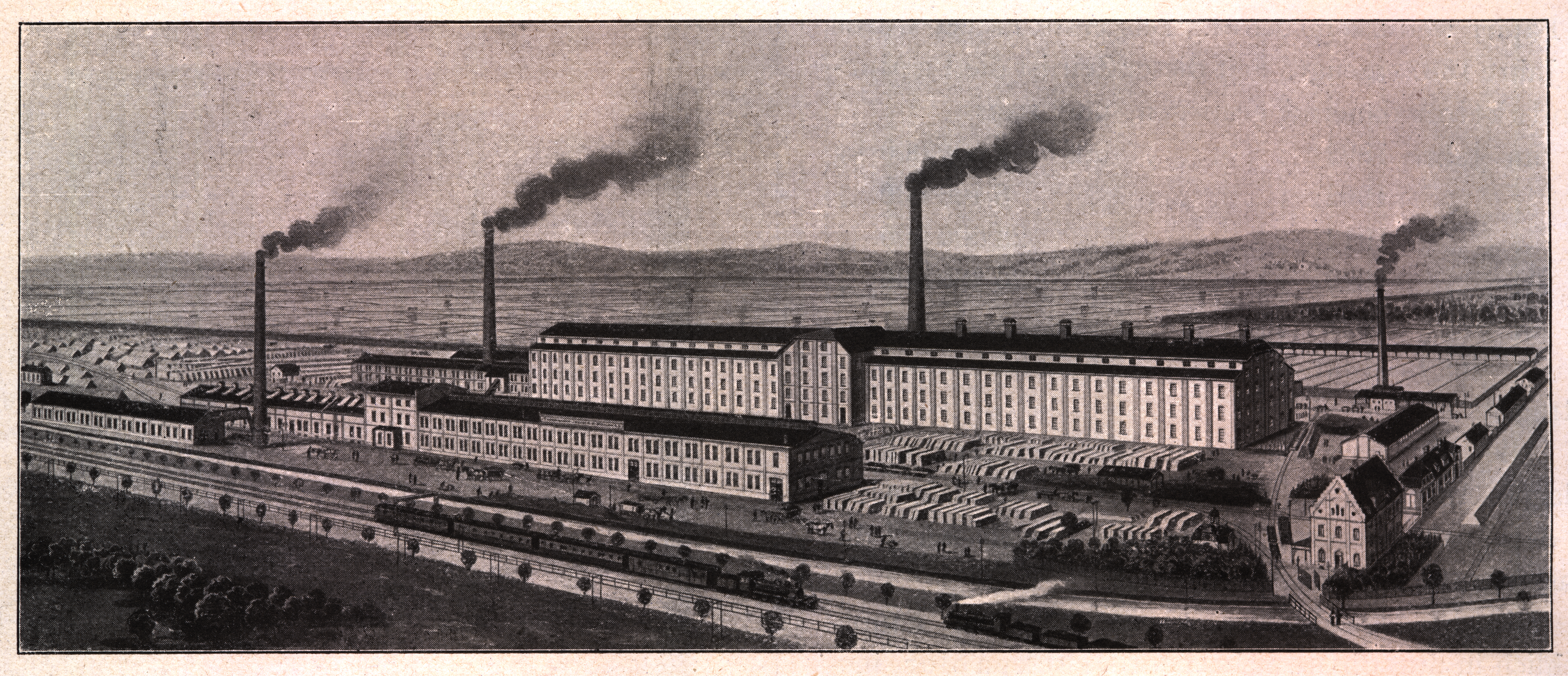
- The factory behind River Leimbach and Mannheim–Karlsruhe–Basel railway just north of Wiesloch-Walldorf station, c.1925. The area would later contain the Wiesloch Feldbahn and Industrial Museum and Leimbach Park.
- Formerly: Thonwaren-Industrie Wiesloch GmbH
- ISIN: DE0007783003
- Industry: Real estate activities on a fee or contract basis Residential care activities for the elderly and disabled human health activities manufacture of clay building materials other mining and quarrying real estate activities residential nursing care activities
- Founded: 15 March 1897; 129 years ago
- Defunct: 14 December 1994
- Fate: Closed 1989
- Successor: City of Wiesloch; Marseille-Kliniken AG
- Headquarters: Wiesloch, Baden
- Products: Roof tiles; Insulated foam

Tonwaren-Industrie Wiesloch (TIW AG, originally Thonwaaren-Industrie Wiesloch GmbH, abbreviated Ton) was a brickworks which existed in Wiesloch, Germany between 1895 and 1989. It was one of the largest and most significant factories in Germany. The factory was located just north of Wiesloch-Walldorf station and was the largest employer in Wiesloch.

Raw clay material was excavated from a clay pit in the Dämmelwald forest on the north-west side of Wiesloch. This clay material was located at an elevation of 120 metres above sea level within the Upper Rhine Graben.

The factory contained one of many industrial 600 mm gauge railways in Germany. Use of the narrow-gauge trains to fetch material from the clay pit finished in 1979. Since 2001 the Wiesloch Feldbahn and Industrial Museum has been based at part of the north end of the site, and since 2016 the Leimbach Park has been built on the south end of the site, with the rest of the area transformed into an industrial zone.

== Location ==
The brickworks was situated in a concentrated node of industry activity around Wiesloch-Walldorf station. In the vicinity were also the Kälberer sand mine (Bausteinwerke Kälberer), the Wiesloch power station (Licht- und Kraftversorgung Wiesloch), the Southern Germany Metal factory (Süddeutschen Metallwerken) and oven manufacturer Welker and Wimmer. In 1912 TIW employed 350 people out of the around one thousand people working in the factories around the station, many of whom lived in the planned village of Frauenweiler.

== Production ==
During the 1920s, the factory produced 12 million roof tiles per year. These were tiles required mining and transport of 31,500 cubic metres (1,110,000 cu ft) of clay, which was turned into slurry. During the frost-free months of the year, this clay-water slurry mixture was distributed in 33,000 square metres (360,000 sq ft) of settling basins. These basins covered 40% of the factory land, as compared to the factory buildings which covered 2.5% of the land.

=== Clay pit ===
In the main years of operation clay was extracted from the Dämmelwald clay pit situation at Parkstraße 6, Wiesloch. In 1988 it was decided to maintain a minimum thickness of 2.5 metres of residual clay as a protection layer for the surrounding ground water. It was decided to not permit hazardous waste to be deposited. In 1992 the pit was re-opened as a landfill site accepting building materials, with 870,000 tonnes of material deposited between 1992 and 2017.

== History ==
On 2 May 1896, Ludwig Schweizer from Bruchsal arranged a contract with the Town of Wiesloch for the extraction of clay. Followed by, on 15 September 1896, an application was made for a private siding connection to the Grand Duchy of Baden State Railway at Wiesloch-Walldorf station.

Starting in 1906, a 2-kilometre narrow gauge railway started operating, using locomotive power. The route of the narrow gauge railway was planned by the Town of Wiesloch. Between 1 and 20 May 1907 the company took part in the International Art and Huge Horticultural Exhibition/Anniversary Exhibition of Mannheim 1907 which took place in the vicinity of the Mannheim Augustaanlage (de).

On 22 July 1916, a fire burnt down most of the factory. In the time period leading up to 1918, production at the factory ceased for approximately three years, during which dividends could not be paid out. At the Annual Meeting, 639 shares were represented and the company's balance and profit were reduced.

On 7 May 1920 an Extraordinary General Meeting was called to increase the capital in the company from 600,000 Marks to 2,350,000 Marks.

In the 1920s the firm allowed free use of their equipment for research by the Geology and Paleontology Institute of the University of Heidelberg.

From 1929 the company had a co-operation with the Carl Ludowici Ziegelwerke (de) at Jockgrim allowing the manufacture based on the Ludowici Ziegelwerke interlocking system.

On 22 March 1945, eighty-percent of the factory burnt down again. One year later oven 3 was restored to operation in March 1946, followed by oven 2 on 6 April 1947 and oven 1 on 23 January 1950.

On 21 July 1991 the fifty-metre-high chimney of the Tonwarenindustrie Wielsoch was demolished.

== Buildings ==
Following closure of the factory and clearing of the site, a few buildings remained:

- TIW Canteen building (Kantine).
- TIW Locomotive Shed (Lokschuppen, or Lokomotivschuppen, Building 16), built in 1905 and restored by the Wiesloch Feldbahn and Industrial Museum.

Three further buildings were advertised for sale by the City of Wiesloch in May 2006.

- TIW Administration building (Verwaltungsgebäude), built in 1899, with five floors (including a basement) and a total of 1,121 square metres (12,070 sq ft) of floor space.
- TIW Director's Villa house (Direktorenvilla, or Wohnhaus), built in 1928, with four floors (including a basement) and a total of 464 square metres (4,990 sq ft) of floor space.
- TIW Gatehouse building (Pförtnerhaus), built in 1949, with a single ground floor of 46 square metres (500 sq ft).

== Locomotives ==
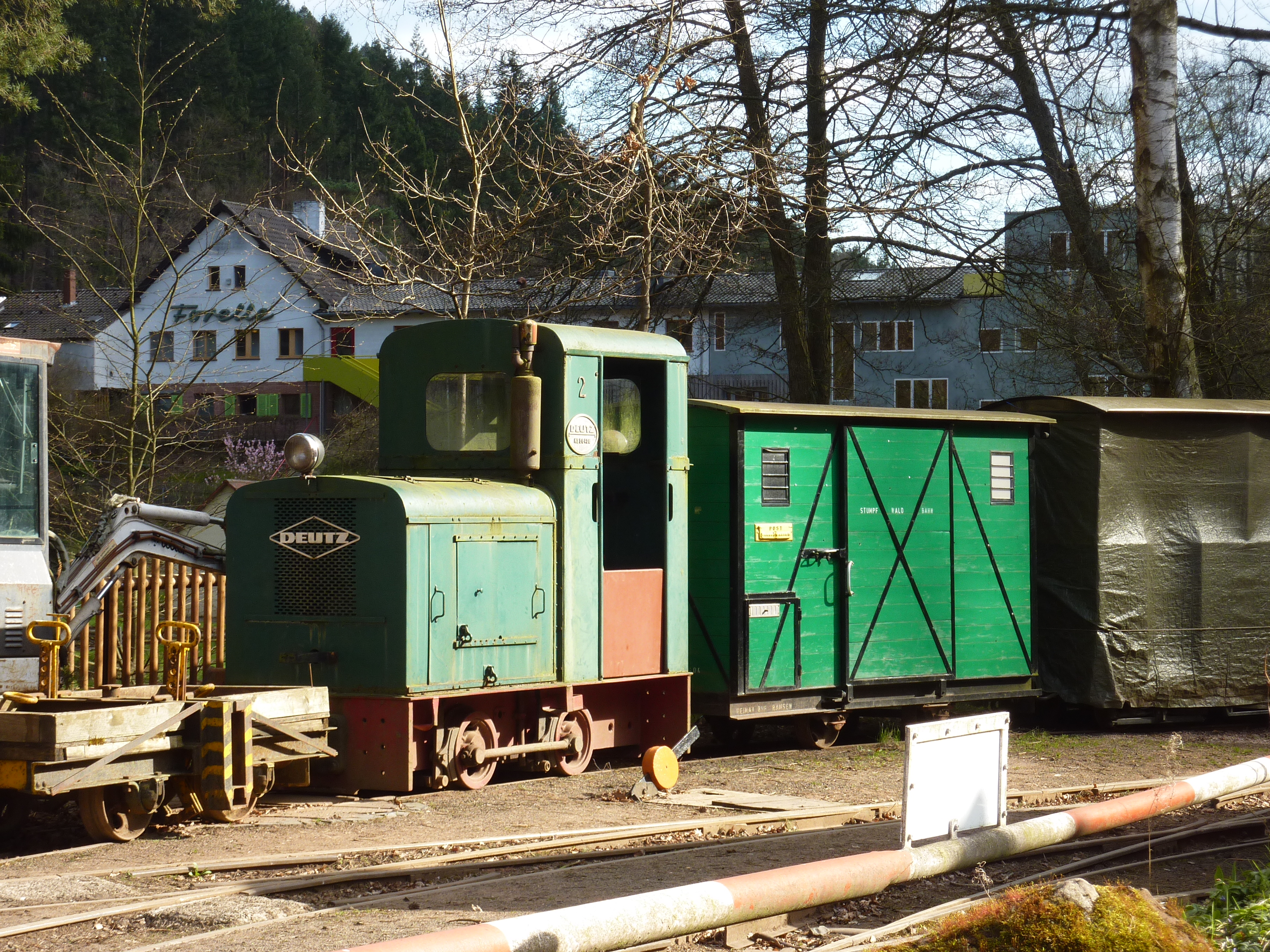
TIW Deutz locomotive 56406, on the Stumpfwald Railway in 2010

The factory used a large number of narrow gauge locomotives, the first steam locomotive from Orenstein & Koppel arriving in 1905, and a second in 1921. From the mid-1930s onwards these were replaced by diesel-powered narrow gauge locomotives. When the narrow gauge system stopped operating there were seven locomotives.

Locomotives of the Tonwaren-Industrie Wiesloch (TIW)
TIW	Gauge	Manufacturer	Model	Number	Built	Status
		MAN AG		1027	1898	stationary steam engine, power generation
		MAN AG			1934	stationary steam engine, power generation
		MAN AG	LE 5 a	5081	1935	stationary steam engine, power generation, scrapped 1985
	600	Orenstein & Koppel	Bt	1792	1905	30 horsepower steam locomotive
	600	Orenstein & Koppel	Bt	9169	1921	steam locomotive
	1435	Breuer	I-III		~1927	
276	1435	Breuer	V	3011	1948	1980‒ out-of-use; spare parts donor, Neustadt/Weinstrasse Railway Museum
	600	Deutz AG	OMZ122 F	11781	1934	
	600	Deutz AG	F2M414 F	47032	1950	Scrapped outside Locomotive Shed in Wiesloch (‒February 1979)
	600	Deutz AG	A2L514 F	56406	1956	Preserved, Stumpfwald Railway (1990–); under restoration (2017)
10	600	Diema	DS40	1930	1956	Preserved, Wiesloch Feldbahn and Industrial Museum (2016–)
6/9	600	Diema	DS28	2690	1964	Preserved, Britzer Garten (–2006); whereabouts unknown (2006–) (Note: Diema 2690 was operated by Klaus Gränert on the Berlin Britzer Garten Museum Railway (Britzer Museumsbahn) until sold via Ebay in 2006. Prior to going to Berlin the original correct Diema DS28 2690/1964 builder's plate was exchanged c.1990 with the builder's plate from another locomotive: that of former-Stumpfwald Railway Emma 1—Diema DL8 number 1904, built in 1956.)
	600	Henschel & Son	DG 26 II	1766	1939	
	600	Henschel & Son	DG 26 II	1775	1939	Preserved, Guldental/Heddesheim Feldbahn Museum (June 1988–)
	600	Henschel & Son	DG 13 IV	2174	1954	
	600	Henschel & Son	DG 26 IV	2261	1952	Preserved, Lengerich, Westphalia (1989–)

== See also ==
- Diepholzer Maschinenfabrik Fritz Schöttler (Diema)
