= Waldangelbach =

River in Germany

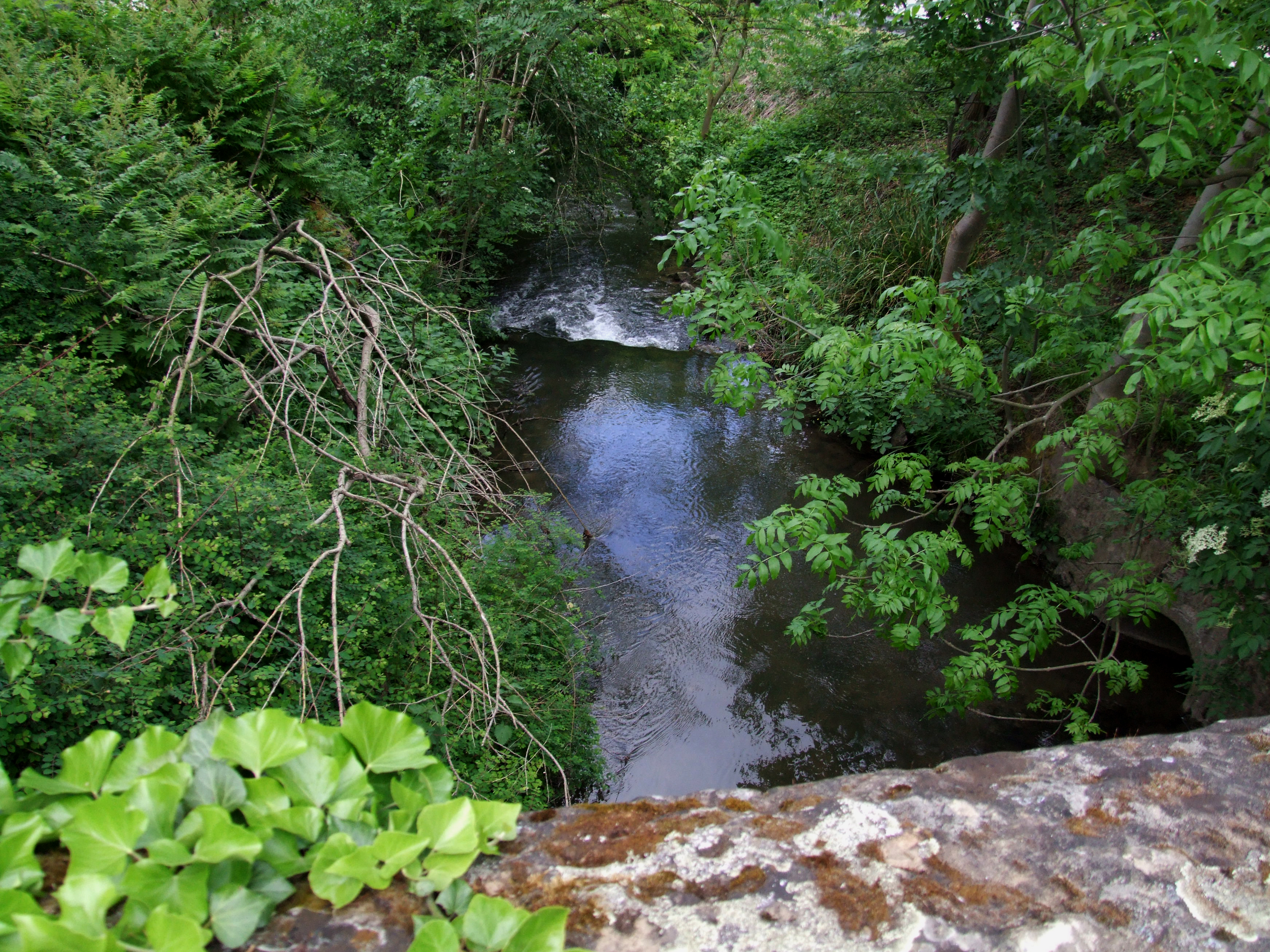

Location
- Country: Germany
- State: Baden-Württemberg

Physical characteristics
- Mouth
  - location: Leimbach
  - coordinates: 49.2915°N 8.6850°E
- Length: 17.1 km (10.6 mi)

Basin features
- Progression: Leimbach→ Rhine→ North Sea

Waldangelbach is a river of Baden-Württemberg, Germany. It flows into the Leimbach in Wiesloch.

During 2017, a €2.4-million project took place to redevelop 210 metres of the Waldangelbach through the Mühlhausen city centre.

In mid-2019, the bed of Waldangelbach between the former Wellpappe factory in Wiesloch, and where the stream flows into Leimbach started to be redeveloped. As part of the construction work, the railway bridge carrying the former local railway between Wiesloch-Walldorf station and Wiesloch city centre was due to be dismantled and relocated to the Wiesloch Feldbahn and Industrial Museum. The bridge arrived at the museum on 8 October 2019.

== See also ==
- List of rivers of Baden-Württemberg
