= TIWAG =

TIWAG may refer to:

- Tiroler Wasserkraft, electric power company in Austria
- Tonwaren-Industrie Wiesloch, brickworks in Germany
