= Wiesloch Feldbahn and Industrial Museum =

Railway and industrial heritage museum in Wiesloch, Germany

Coordinates: 49.29807°N 8.66838°E

- Feldbahn- und Industriemuseum Wiesloch
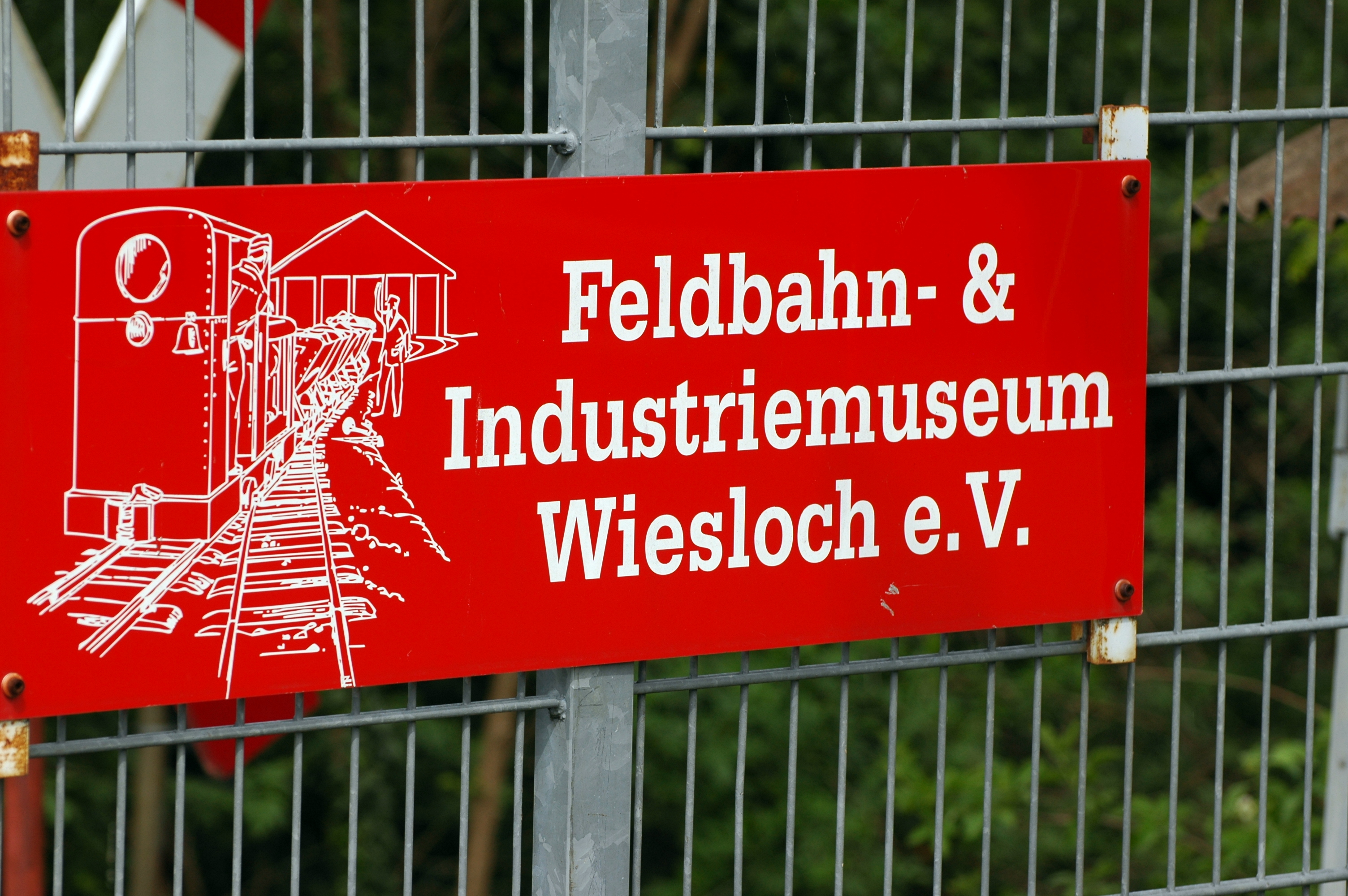

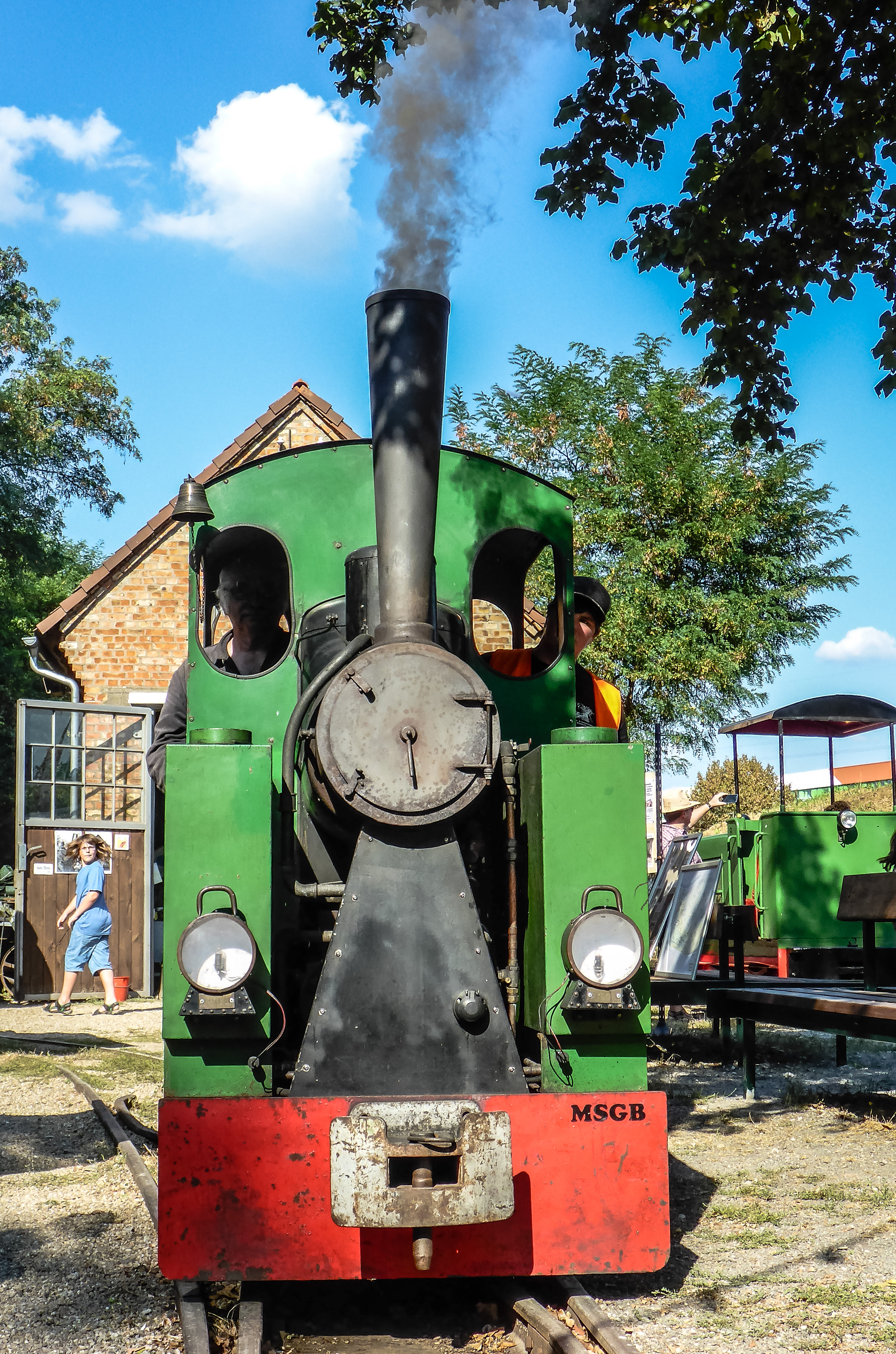
- Locomotive shed and visiting steam engine in 2016
- Established: 2001
- Location: Wiesloch, Germany
- Type: Industrial museum; Narrow-gauge railway
- Key holdings: Bucket chain excavator
- Owner: Feldbahn- und Industriemuseum Wiesloch e.V
- Public transit access: Wiesloch-Walldorf station
- Parking: REWE (opposite; free on open days)
- Website: www.feldbahnmuseum-wiesloch.de

The Wiesloch Feldbahn and Industrial Museum (German: Feldbahn- und Industriemuseum Wiesloch, FIW) is a narrow-gauge railway and industrial heritage open-air museum established in 2001, at Wiesloch, Germany. The museum is centred around the former locomotive shed of the Tonwaren-Industrie Wiesloch (TIW) brickworks, and houses industrial equipment from large excavators to small machine tools, plus large and small locomotives.

It is 650 metres (0.4 mi) north of Wiesloch-Walldorf station, lying between the Leimbach creek and mainline Mannheim–Karlsruhe–Basel railway to the west, and the Bundesstraße 3 and REWE supermarket Group's south-west central warehouses to the east.

== History ==
The museum is based partly on the site of the former Tonwaren-Industrie Wiesloch brickworks which closed in 1989 and had been served by a 600-millimetre narrow-gauge railway network. During the 1960s the brickworks employed approximately 320 people and the narrow-gauge trains were used for transporting raw material from the Dämmel clay pit to the brickworks. Following the completion of clay mining the area was backfilled, burying the narrow-gauge locomotive shed and raising the area of the surrounding landscape. Further heavy development on the subsequent site of the museum would have required twelve-metre deep foundations, which would have been uneconomical, ultimately leading to the preservation of the site.

The museum area covers two hectares, and is covered with mature trees, and this woodland area is kept for shade and enjoyment. The land is home to wild animals, including lizards, hares and occasionally deer. Two ex-Deutsche Bahn railway wagons serve as a workshop and club house, on their own length of standard gauge track.

A plan for restoration of the locomotive shed and operation of narrow-gauge passenger trains were presented to the City of Wiesloch in 2000. The estimated costs for the plan were 100,000 DM (€50,000). Narrow gauge trains were additionally seen as an attraction for a planned garden festival (Landesgartenschau) proposed in Wiesloch/Walldorf at the time.

The museum is operated by the Feldbahn- und Industriemuseum Wiesloch e.V registered association (eingetragener Verein), with the management board (Vorstand) elected by the members of the organisation. The museum society was founded on 7 September 2001. A new management board was elected in March 2012, March 2015, and adjusted in early 2019. Approximately fifty volunteer members maintain the museum, of which fifteen were actively involved in 2014. In 2005 the Locomotive shed had its 100th birthday and in 2006 the museum society had its fifth birthday.

=== Locomotive shed ===
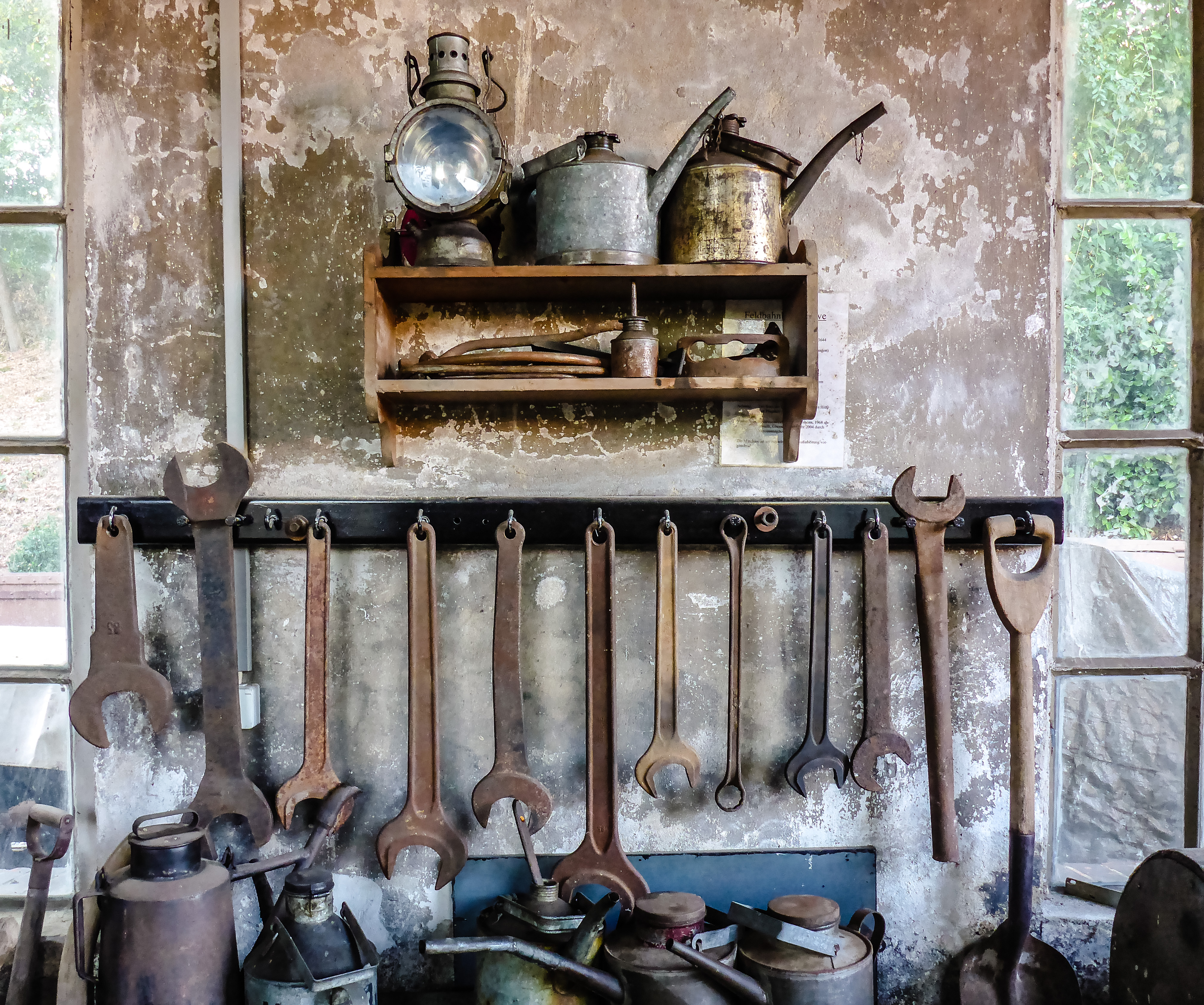
Tools hanging in original part of the historic locomotive shed

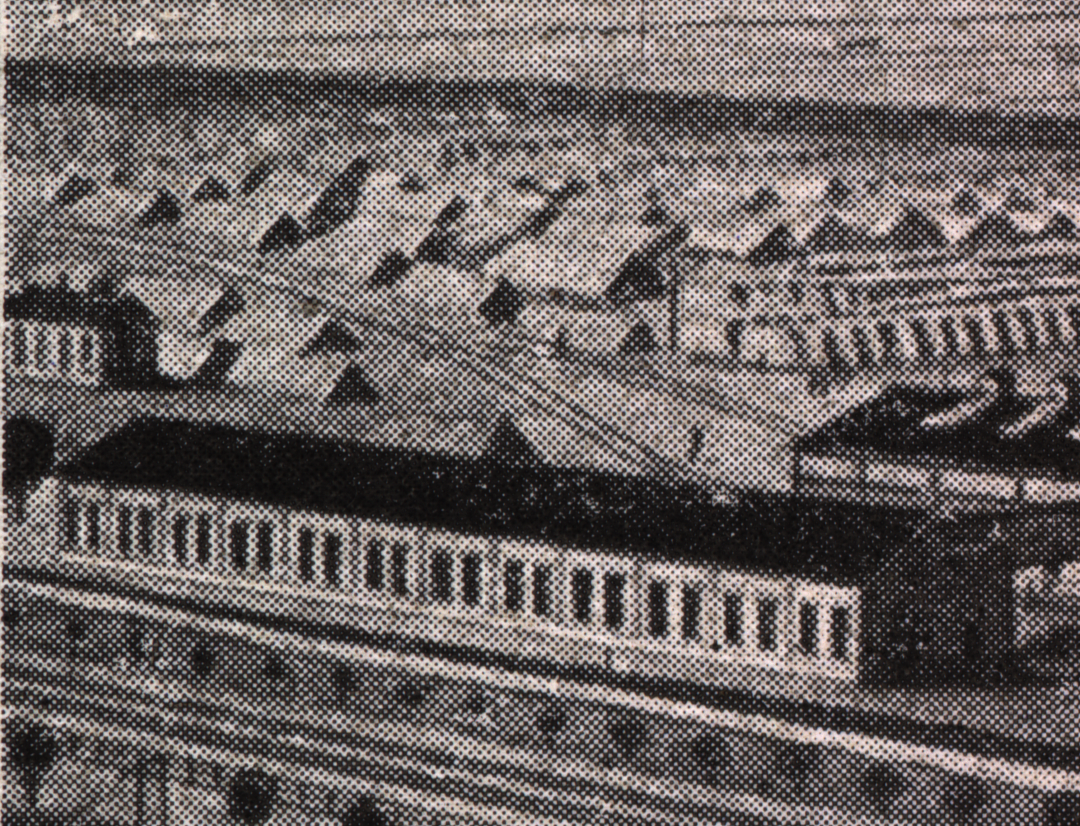
Engraving showing narrow gauge tracks and small locomotive shed c.1925, prior to extension (left)

The narrow gauge locomotive workshop (Lokschuppen) was built from brick (Klinkerbauweise) in 1905 to house stream locomotives, and later diesel locomotives. The locomotive shed retains two chimney flues originally used to enable lighting up of steam locomotives undercover. It is a listed historic industrial monument (industriegeschichtliches Denkmal) and unique in southern Germany.

Text stating "TIW 1905" is embossed in the roof tiles. The shed was extended after World War II and this remains visible in the brickwork. In its later operational years it housed seven narrow-gauge diesel locomotives that operated between the clay pit and the brickworks. Commercial operation of the narrow gauge locomotives ended in 1979.

The locomotive shed is at the lowest level of the site, representing the original land level of the whole area. During the 1990s the area covered by the brickworks was transformed into a new industrial area, with the locomotive shed one of four original TIW buildings to survive. The building was left empty and started to decay. By 2000 the locomotive shed had been buried under the ground with its windows broken.

==== Restoration ====
Firstly the locomotive shed had to be excavated by the members of the museum. The rest of the museum site was then constructed on a gradual basis. As of 2016 the building had been refitted out with traditional machinery used for milling metal, pillar drills, and metal lathes.

Also in 2016 there were plans to construct a new locomotive shed to store all of the museum's locomotives, and to allow the original historic shed to be more easily viewed by visitors. The new shed was planned to have two tracks for storing locomotives, and had been awaiting planning permission since 2014 with construction occurring during 2017.

=== Construction equipment ===
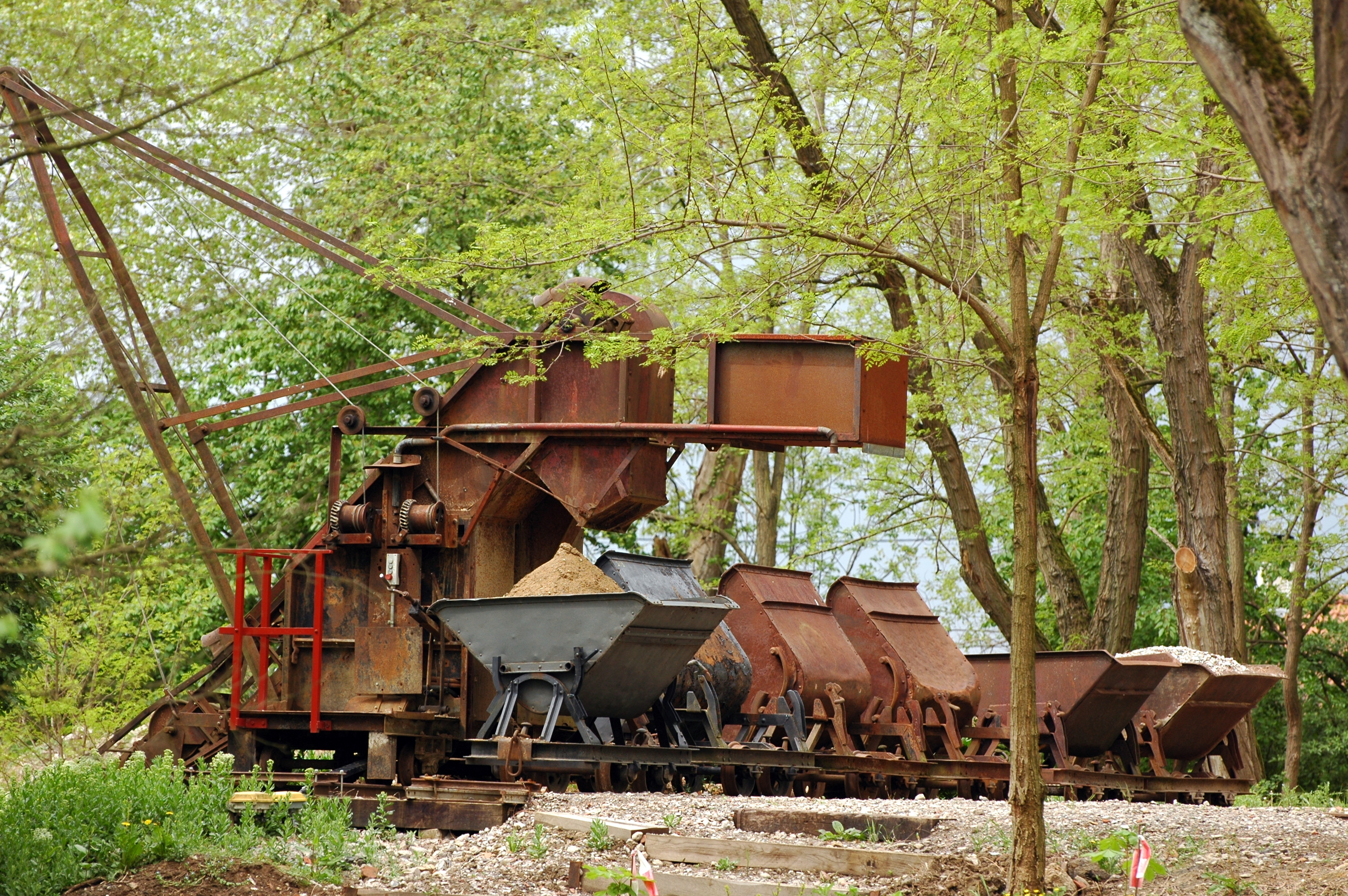
Bucket chain excavator from Bavaria loading wagons

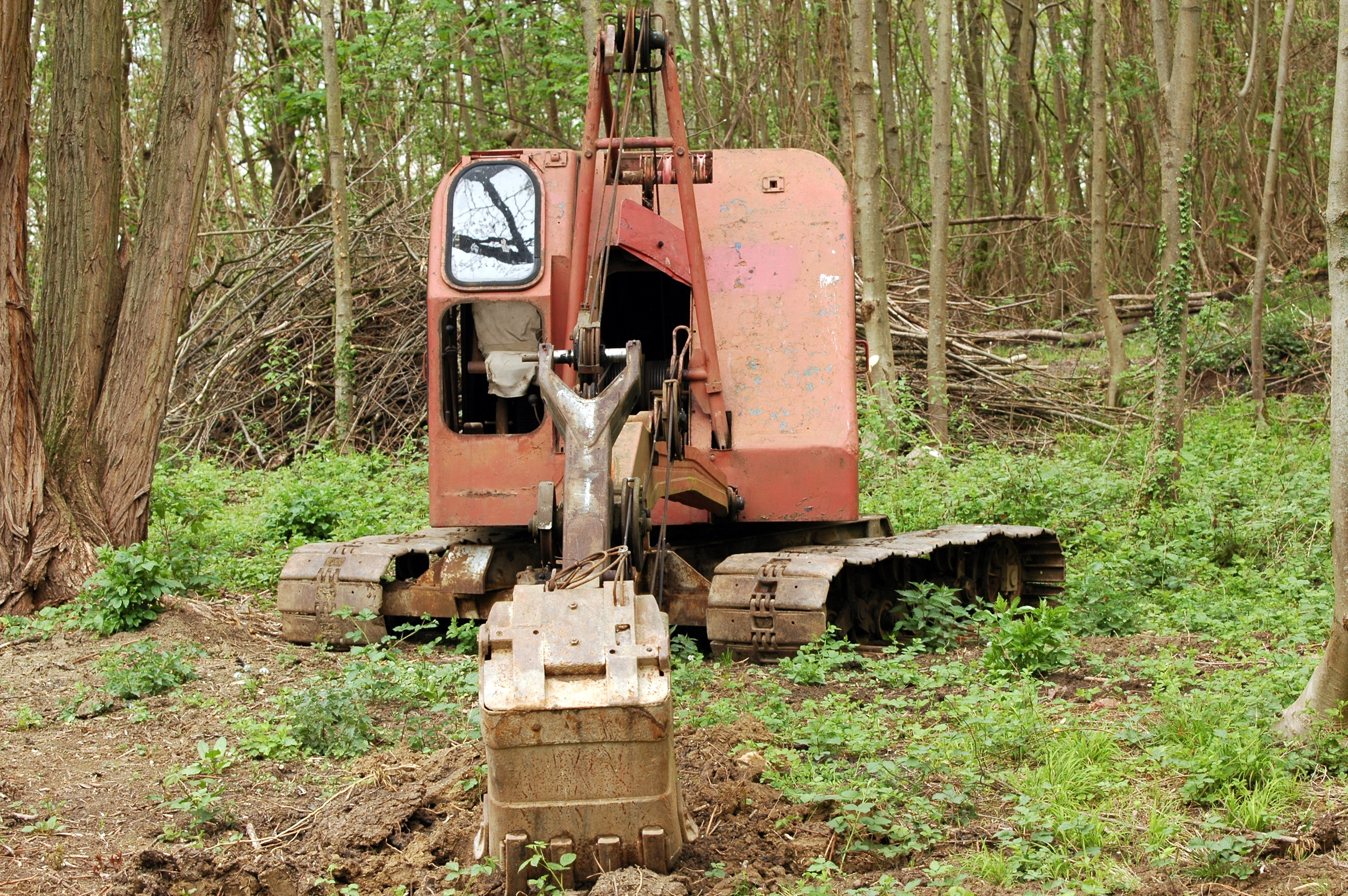
Part of the museum's collection of working construction machinery

As of 2012 the museum collection included half-a-dozen cranes, diggers, and excavators, including an Orenstein & Koppel L 051 power shovel that arrived in May 2012. In 2014 a crawler excavator rescued by Walter Ofenloch was added to the collection. By 2017 there were ten construction machines with eight restored and working.

At the highest point of the museum there is a working bucket chain excavator built in 1948 and previously used by a mine in Wasserberg, Bavaria until 1976. The bucket chain excavator arrived at the museum in October 2010, allowing the opening of a clay pit exhibition area in 2012, and is now operated by a three-phase electric motor. These machines can be used to demonstrate traditional clay, sand and gravel mining techniques.

In 2015 Weiland Crane and Transport Group brought a Pekazett TK 5 crane owned by the Rattelsdorf Crane and Construction Museum to the site.

=== Narrow gauge railway ===
The museum site has a 600-millimetre (2 ft) narrow-gauge railway (Feldbahn) network, one of several 600 mm gauge railways in Germany. This connects the original 1905 locomotive shed to the rest of the site.

Part of the museum railway track extends 400 metres (0.25 mi) southwards through the old brickworks to the Landratsamt district offices opposite Leimbach Park. This section uses the former standard gauge railway siding linking the REWE central warehouse to Wiesloch-Walldorf station and so track gauge conversion to narrow gauge was necessary. An earlier plan had been for conversion of the REWE siding to dual gauge using a three- or four-rail arrangement. By late-2002, the gauge conversion to 600 millimetre, and connection to the tracks around the locomotive shed allowed a significant expansion of the railway activities.

Beginning in 2011 a second route was opened, running through woodland to the museum's bucket chain excavator. On 30 September 2013 this was inspected by the TÜV Rheinland technical inspection agency to certify it for passenger use. During 2015–2016 additional track was laid increasing the drivable distance to 1.4 kilometres (0.9 miles). In September 2016 the circular Waldstrecke (Woodland route) was opened by Mayor of Wiesloch Ludwig Sauer, with politicians Karl Klein and Claudia Martin attending.

==== Locomotives ====
The museum has a large collection of Gmeinder diesel locomotives, including the last locomotive delivered by the Gmeinder company—Gmeinder #5366—a 4.5-tonne diesel locomotive manufactured in the nearby town of Mosbach in 1965 and rescued from Spain. A Gmeinder locomotive and associated passengers wagons originally used for the 1990 Landesgartenschau garden festival were obtained on permanent loan from the City of Würzburg. Another Gmeinder locomotive was rescued from the Vatter stone quarry in Dossenheim, along with some tipper wagons.

As of 2012 the museum had a Henschel & Son locomotive awaiting restoration of a type that originally worked at the Tonwaren-Industrie Wiesloch brickworks, as well as a six-tonne Diema locomotive matching a type originally used at the TIW brickworks. As of 2014 the Diema was awaiting repairs to its suspension.

In early-2014 a Deutz AG Diesel locomotive made in 1938 arrived from Belgium.

In November 2016 the museum received an original Diema locomotive that had been delivered to the TIW brickworks in 1956. Up until the end of the 1970s the Diema DS40 locomotive had for many decades transported wagons between the Dämmelwald clay pit and the TIW brickworks. The museum planned to restore and repaint the seven-tonne locomotive in its original green colour for 2017. After being withdrawn in the 1980s, the Diema locomotive had travelled around Germany and ended up at a museum in Klütz.

During 2017, the museum received a Deutz OME 117 F locomotive, of the same type that also used to work in the Tonwarenindustrie Wiesloch brickworks. A donation to help with the restoration was received at the end of 2019.

=== Mine ===
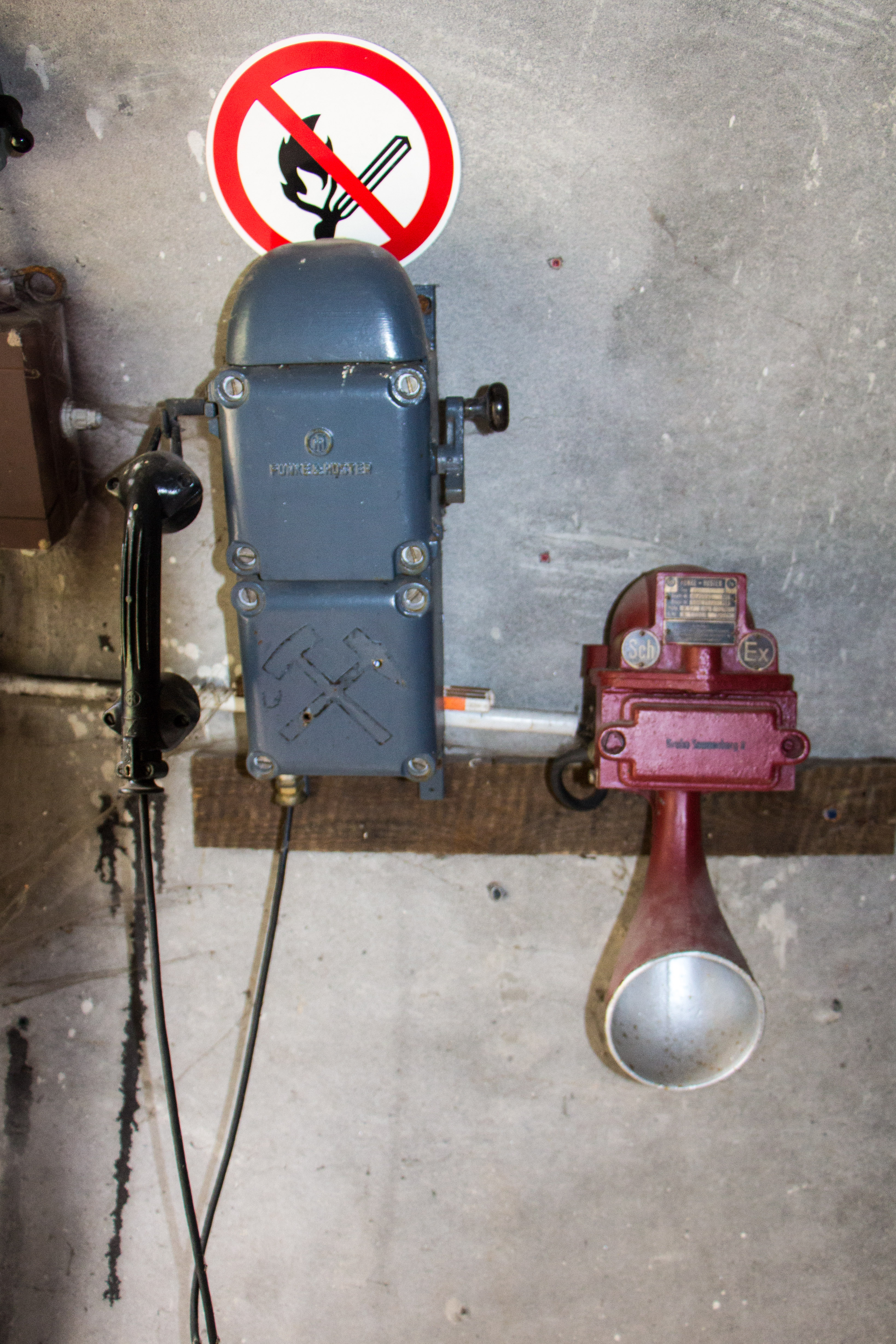
Underground telephone in one of the mineshafts

In 2002 a tunnel to demonstrate traditional mining around Wiesloch was planned. This led to the construction of an underground mining area with two adits leading into it to demonstrate iron ore mining.

=== Other exhibits ===
The Model Railway Club of the Palatinate (German: Modelleisenbahnfreunde Kurpfalz) had been temporarily based at the museum, between its original home in Rauenberg and moving to the Session building, also near Wiesloch-Walldorf station. In March-2012 the club moved to a new permanent home inside the old Wiesloch City railway station building (Wiesloch Stadtbahnhof). On the occasion of the move Franz Stier, from the Feldbahn museum, presented the model railway club with a carriage destination sign that had been used for the last mainline steam locomotive trip to the old station on 31 March 1980.

== Open days ==
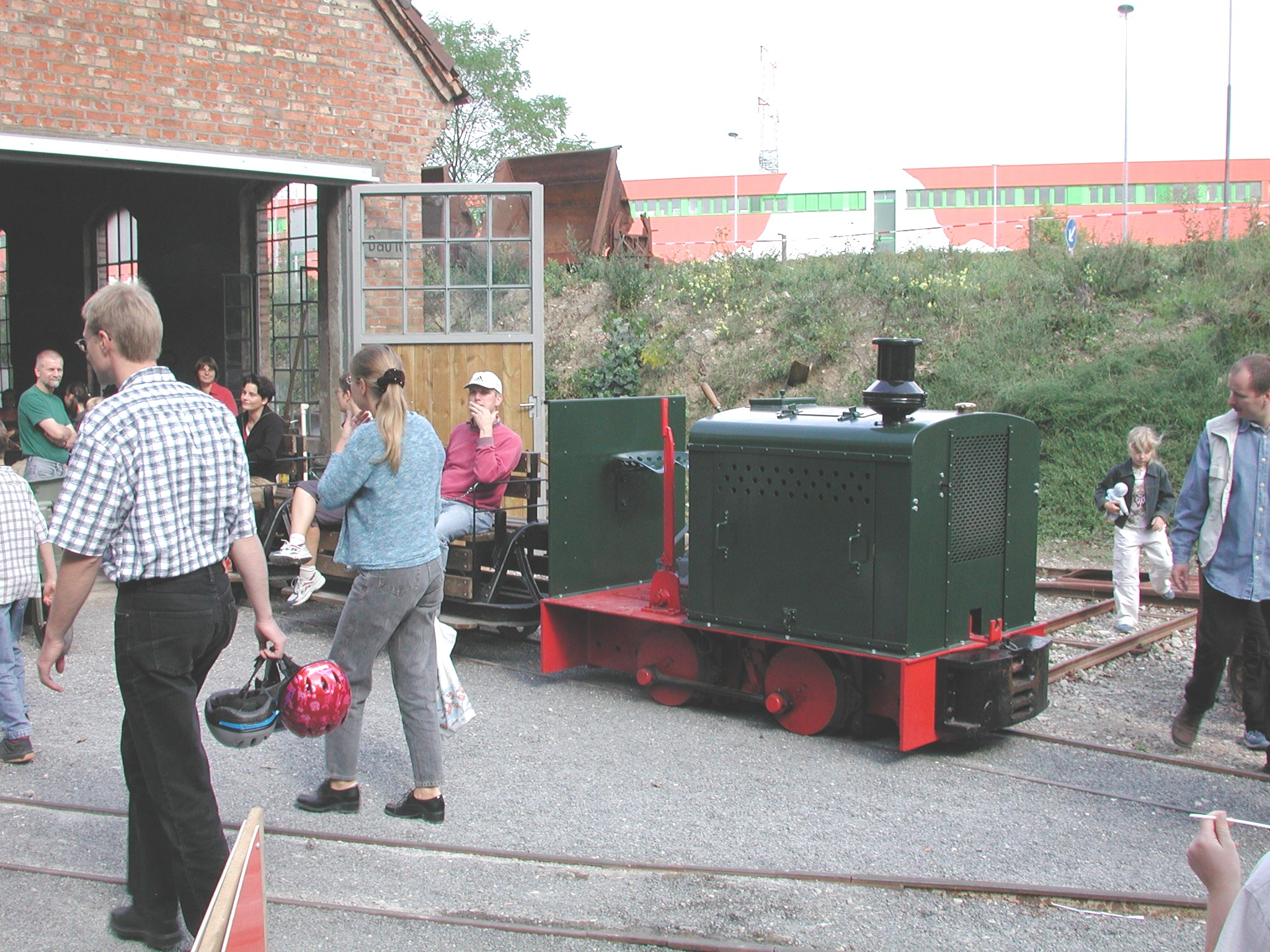
Passenger train ready to depart from the 1905-locomotive shed

The museum has four-to-six scheduled open days each year, plus additional dates for school children and groups:

- Journey into Springtime (Fahrt in den Frühling/Frühlingsfahrtag) in March/April
- May Day/Labour Day (Fahrt in den Mai/Tag der Arbeit)
- Digger day (Baggertag) in June
- September: Tag des offenen Denkmals coordinated by the Deutsche Stiftung Denkmalschutz, in 2012, 2013, 2014, 2015, 2016 and 2018
- Lantern-evening (Funzel- und Laternenabend), in October 2010 or Halloween/Ghost train, in 2017
- Saint Nicholas Day-themed open days were held in December 2012, 2013, and 2014.

The museum has free entrance for visitors. As of 2014 train trips were €0.60 for children and €1.20 for adults. A Tablet-based cashier system is used and was originally developed for the museum.

=== Special events ===
In June 2002 the museum held a Locomotive Shed Festival (Lokschuppenfest) jointly coordinated with an open day at the bus depot of the Südwestdeutsche Verkehrs-Aktiengesellschaft (SWEG) transport company in Wiesloch.

In June 2003 children who had been unable to go on holiday visited the museum as part of a holiday programme.

On 6–7 June 2009 a steam locomotive made by Henschel & Son visited from the Stumpfwald Railway for the Steam Days weekend (Dampftage im Feldbahnmuseum). On 25 June 2009 the museum held a lecture by historian Thomas Adam on "Exploring the Region" (Streifzüge durch die Region).

During 26–27 June 2010 two steam-themed days (Dampftage im Feldbahnmuseum) were held. On 18 September 2010 the museum hosted a volunteering day as part of the "We create something" (Wir Schaffen was) regional volunteering scheme.

On 25 September 2011 children and parents from the Rauenberg Music Society (Musikverein Rauenberg) visited the museum as part of their tour. The children tested both a rail bike, and a pump trolley, and visited the underground mine.

On 25 May 2012, owners of classic BMW Motorrad motorbikes visited the museum.

On 12 August 2013 children and adults from the Rauenberg Art and Local History Association (Freunde der Kunst und der Heimatgeschichte Weinstadt Rauenberg e. V.) visited the museum, with children testing out a railbike (Schienfahrrad) at the museum. On 2 October 2013 the museum hosted a themed-reading afternoon for 76 children based on the children's literature book Jim Button and Luke the Engine Driver by German author Michael Ende. On 13 October 2013 members of the Heidelberg Railway Society (Eisenbahnfreunde Heidelberg) visited both the Wiesloch Feldbahn museum and the Sonderheim Brickworks Museum Ziegeleimuseum Sondernheim. On 9 November 2013 the museum hosted the south-west regional meeting of the Bundesverband Deutscher Eisenbahn-Freunde (BDEF).

On 4 October 2014, children and parents of the Astrid-Lindgren school in Bad Schönborn visited the museum.

==== 2015 onwards ====
In August 2015 children from the Rauenberg Music school visited and learnt how to make nails in the museum's forge prior to creating music with the nails. On 17 October 2015 children and parents from the Wiesloch Schiller School (Förderverein der Schillerschule Wiesloch e.V) walked to the museum for their annual outing and saw a demonstration of the bucket chain excavator. On 5 December 2015 local school students visited the Feldbahn museum for inspiration as part of their "Students make newspapers" project (Schüler machen Zeitung) run by the Rhein-Neckar-Zeitung newspaper.

In August 2016 twenty children visited for a holiday programme run by the German Green Party. Train trips were offered in conjunction with the opening of the Leimbach Park on 22 October 2016. During 9–11 September 2017 the Museum held a 15th-year Jubilee Festival, coinciding with the 111th anniversary of the narrow gauge locomotive shed. On the first evening the Mayor of Wiesloch ceremonially opened the new Waldstrecke forest route. On 8 October 2016 the museum again hosted the regional meeting of the BDEF.

On 25 June 2017 the members of the museum ran round trips from the train from the edge of the Leimbach Park as part of the Wiesloch/Walldorf "Day of the Open Gardens" 2017. A bicycle transport wagon was specially prepared for the Mayors of Wiesloch and Walldorf on their cycling trip. On 12 August 2017, children from the Mannaberg School in Rauenberg visited the museum, seeing the turntable, locomotive shed, diggers, mineshafts. Children rode on the cycle draisine and along the planned extension route before playing football, Twister and coconut shy on the museum grounds. On 16 September 2017, during the Oldies im Park exhibition of historic vehicles in the Wiesloch Gerbersruhpark, the volunteer fire brigade operating a shuttle service with old fire engines to transport visitors to and from the Museum.

On 31 March 2018, eighty family members from the Wiesloch Fire Brigade visited the museum for their Easter Sunday outing. In August 2018, children from Hockenheim visited the museum as part of a holiday programme, then one week later members of the Hockenheim Local History Society cycled as a group from Hockenheim to Wiesloch to visit the museum. In mid-2019 children from Hockenheim again visited the museum as part of a holiday programme, making use of a new covered picnic area.

== Recognition ==
In April 2011 the museum received an award from the Citizen's Foundation of Wiesloch (Bürgerstiftung Wiesloch) for its dedication to promoting culture and education. In 2012 the museum had a youth exchange programme with the Frankfurt Feldbahn Museum.

On 7 December 2013 the museum was featured in the 800th episode of the SWR Fernsehen television series Eisenbahn-Romantik, in the episode "From small trains and big plans – on the narrow gauge track" (German: "Von kleinen Zügen und großen Plänen - der Feldbahn auf der Spur"). Filming for the episode occurred in July 2012.

In 2014 the museum entered the "Museum has a Future" (Heimatmuseum hat Zukunft) awards run by the Working Group for Fostering Local Culture in the district of Karlsruhe (Arbeitskreis Heimatpflege Regierungsbezirk Karlsruhe) and reached the top ten. Based on the presented future plans and educational work the museum was selected as the winner of the Förderpreis advancement award of €5,000, which was awarded at Schloss Bruchsal in June 2015. The prize money was targeted for construction of the new locomotive shed, and restoration of the Diema DS40 locomotive. On 26 October 2016 president of the region of Karlsruhe Nicolette Kressl held a press conference at the museum.

During 2016‒2019, various parts of the museum were recreated in a model railway using 12-millimetre-gauge track (0.47 in) and 1:43-scale O scale feldbahn ("Of") models. The replica of the locomotive shed was constructed from 8,000 individual model bricks.

In November 2019, Wiesloch's Carnival club (Karnevalsgesellschaft Blau-Weiss Wiesloch) unveiled a medal for the 2019/2020 season, featuring the locomotive shed of the museum. In December 2019, in recognition of volunteer effort, the museum received a donation from mtMax, a software company that had originally developed and tested the "Kasse Speedy" cash register at the museum.

=== City of Wiesloch ===
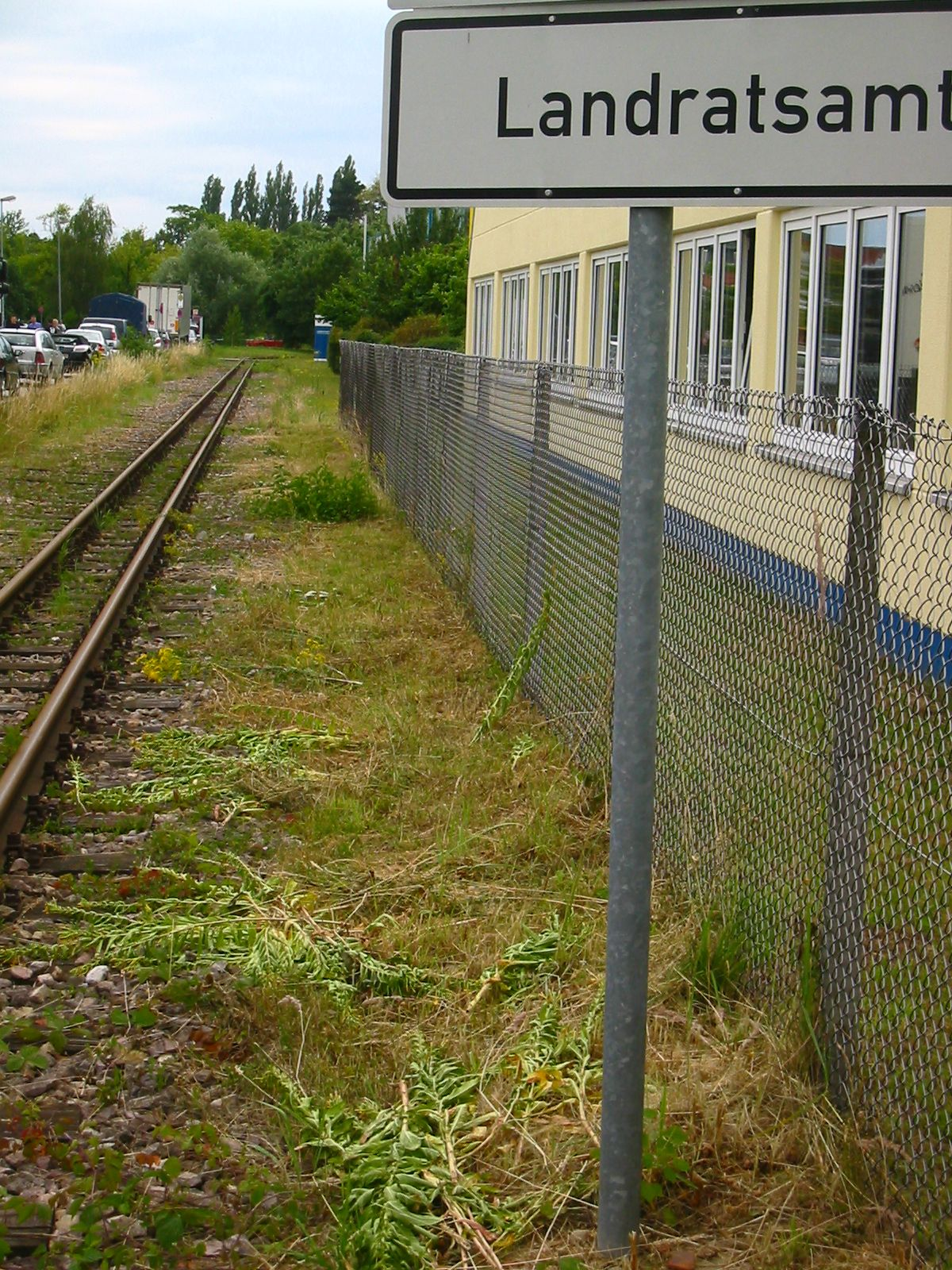
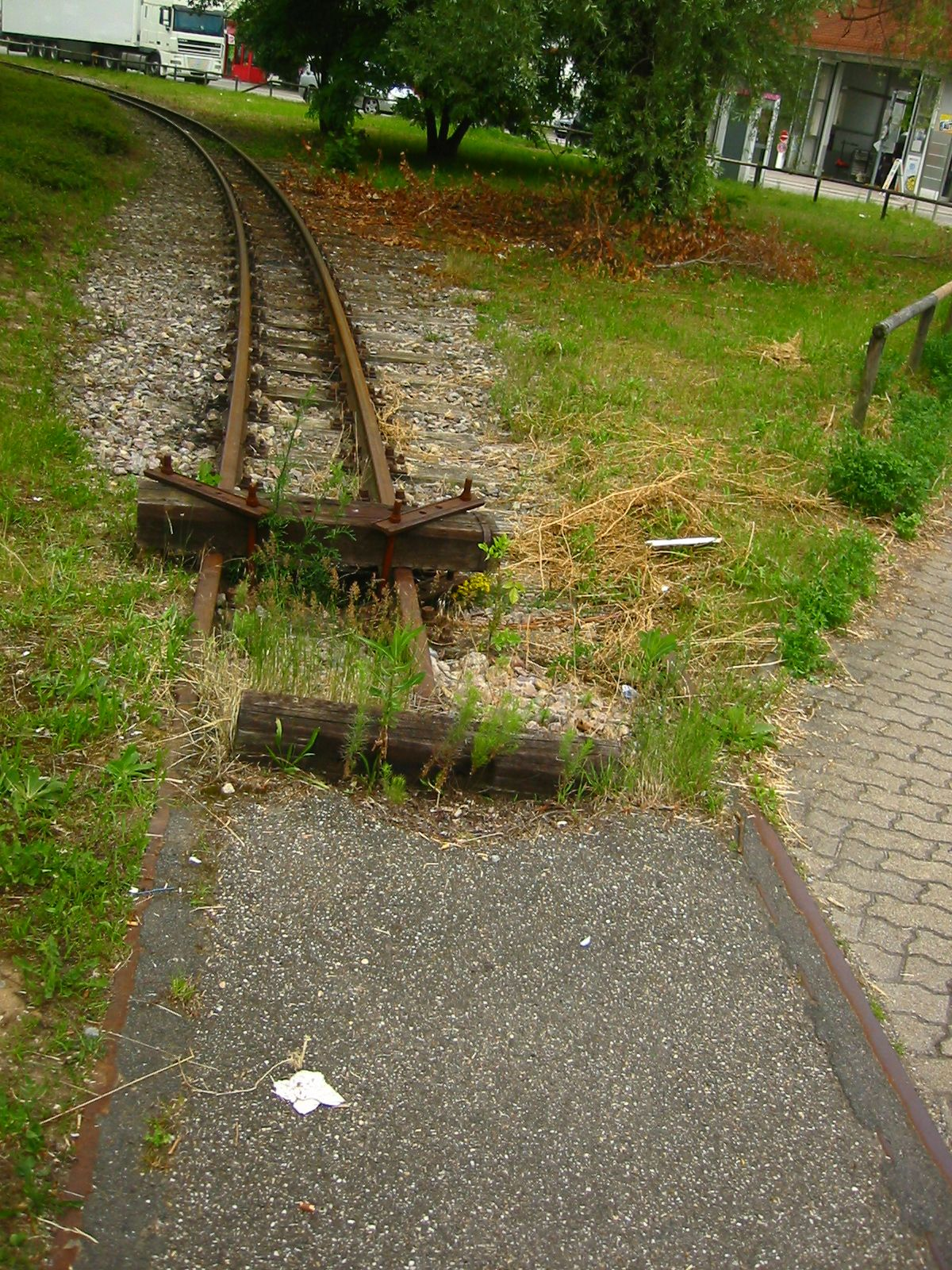
Landratsamt (district office) route with end of track, awaiting extension into the Leimbach Park

The City of Wiesloch owns the land the museum is built on, and has enlarged the area leased to the museum on several occasions. The 1985 outline development plan for the Weinäcker zone covering the brickworks stated that the raised area used as a tip between the brickworks and the sewage works should be held back as natural compensation for other development in the area. A 1987 plan for expansion of the sewage works described the Feldbahn route as overgrown with bushes and trees; the variation in flora detected along the Feldbahn route was used to divide the land on either side of the route into multiple areas for individual construction. The land used by the museum was purchased by the city in 1989 after the closure of the Tonwaren-Industrie Wiesloch brickworks.

==== 2000s ====
In June 2001 the city agreed an initial lease for 1,400 square metres (0.14 hectares; 15,000 sq ft) to enable protection of the locomotive shed and the immediate surroundings. In March 2004 a new five-year lease was agreed, plus an additional access agreement allowing the museum to use a strip of land that had originally been reserved to enable main line railway access to the AVR recycling centre. In October 2009 the lease was extended and enlarged by an extra 3,320 square metres (0.33 hectares; 36,000 sq ft) to the south of the locomotive shed, plus approximately 3,000 square metres (0.30 hectares; 32,000 sq ft) on a short-term lease.

==== 2010s ====
In January 2010 a geological survey showed that the land parcel surrounding the locomotive shed would be unsuitable for commercial development. In late-2010 a 2,500-square-metre-area (0.25-hectare; 27,000 sq ft) area was allocated for backfilling 6,000 cubic metres (7,800 cu yd) of sand and other material from the construction of the central bus station at Wiesloch-Walldorf station the following year.

In May 2011 Feldbahn- und Industriemuseum Wiesloch e.V submitted an outline conceptual proposal to the City of Wiesloch for significantly expanding the museum. In November 2011 the museum and City of Wiesloch agreed a supplementary lease covering a total of 27,500 square metres (2.8 hectares; 300,000 sq ft) in conjunction with the planned flood protection works to the River Leimbach north of the Leimbach Park. This lease included a specified 10-to-15-metre (35 to 50 ft) riparian buffer zone reserved for vegetation facing towards the river. In recognition of the duty of care in conservation and management of the site and large demonstrated volunteer work, the City of Wiesloch awarded a cost-free peppercorn rent for fifteen years.

In recognition for long voluntary service since 2001 to the museum, Franz Stier as technical director of the museum, received the honorary medal of the City of Wiesloch on 2 July 2019.

==== Leimbach Park ====
In January 2017 the Environment and Technical committee of the City of Wiesloch unanimously agreed a proposal for extension of the narrow gauge museum tracks into the Leimbach Park (Park am Leimbach). The proposal would use grassed track in the meadow areas of the park. By June 2017, work had already begun on the extension into the Leimbach Park. On 25 June 2017, the members of the museum had an information stand at the edge of the Leimbach Park with the extension plans the joint Wiesloch–Walldorf Day of the Open Gardens (Tag der offenen Gärten und Höfe). During winter 2018/2019 approximately 200 metres of track were laid into the Park.

==== Railway bridge ====
In mid-2019, the City of Wiesloch and the Wiesloch/Walldorf Sewage and Flood Protection Association (AHW, Abwasser- und Hochwasserschutzverband) donated a railway bridge to the museum. The bridge had been constructed in 1901 from steel and sandstone, and had stood for nearly 120 years carrying the standard gauge branch line over the Waldangelbach stream in Wiesloch, next to the former corrugated cardboard factory.

== See also ==
- Diepholzer Maschinenfabrik Fritz Schöttler (Diema)
