= Mannheim–Karlsruhe–Basel railway =

Rail line in Germany

Rhine Valley Railway
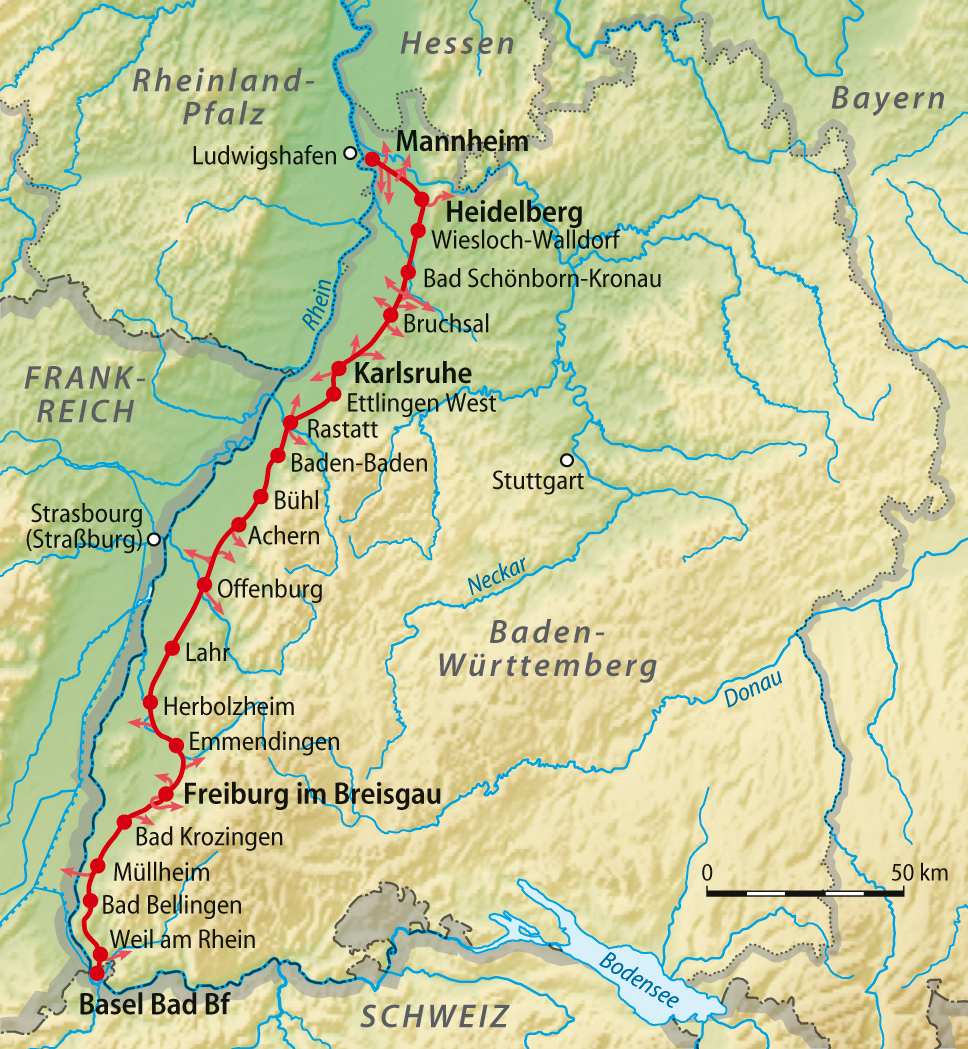

Overview
- Native name: Rheintalbahn
- Line number: 4002 (Mannheim–Heidelberg); 4000 (Heidelberg–Karlsruhe); 4280 (Karlsruhe–Basel)
- Locale: Baden-Württemberg, Germany
- Termini: Mannheim Hbf; Basel Bad

Service
- Route number: 665 (Mannheim–Heidelberg); 701 (Heidelberg–Karlsruhe); 702 (Karlsruhe–Basel)

Technical
- Line length: 270.7 km (168.2 mi)
- Track gauge: 1,435 mm (4 ft 8 1/2 in) standard gauge
- Electrification: 15 kV/16.7 Hz AC overhead catenary
- Operating speed: 250 km/h (160 mph) (max)

The Mannheim–Karlsruhe–Basel railway is a double-track electrified mainline railway in the German state of Baden-Württemberg. It runs from Mannheim via Heidelberg, Bruchsal, Karlsruhe, Rastatt, Baden-Baden, Offenburg and Freiburg to Basel, Switzerland. It is also known as the Rhine Valley Railway (German: Rheintalbahn) or the Upper Rhine Railway (Oberrheinbahn).

The line was built as part of the Baden Mainline (Badische Hauptbahn). Between Mannheim and Rastatt it runs parallel to the Baden Rhine Railway (Rheinbahn). The Karlsruhe–Basel high-speed railway, called the Ausbau- und Neubaustrecke Karlsruhe–Basel in German (literally: "Upgraded and new line Karlsruhe–Basel"), has been under construction since April 1987. This includes upgrading the current line to four-tracks in places and the construction of new line elsewhere. It was originally envisaged as being completed in 2008. The new construction work will be completed by 2035. The existing Rhine Valley Railway will then be expanded in the Offenburg – Hügelheim section by 2041 for speeds of up to 200 km/h.

The Mannheim–Basel railway is one of the most important routes in the Deutsche Bahn network.

== History ==
=== Baden main line ===
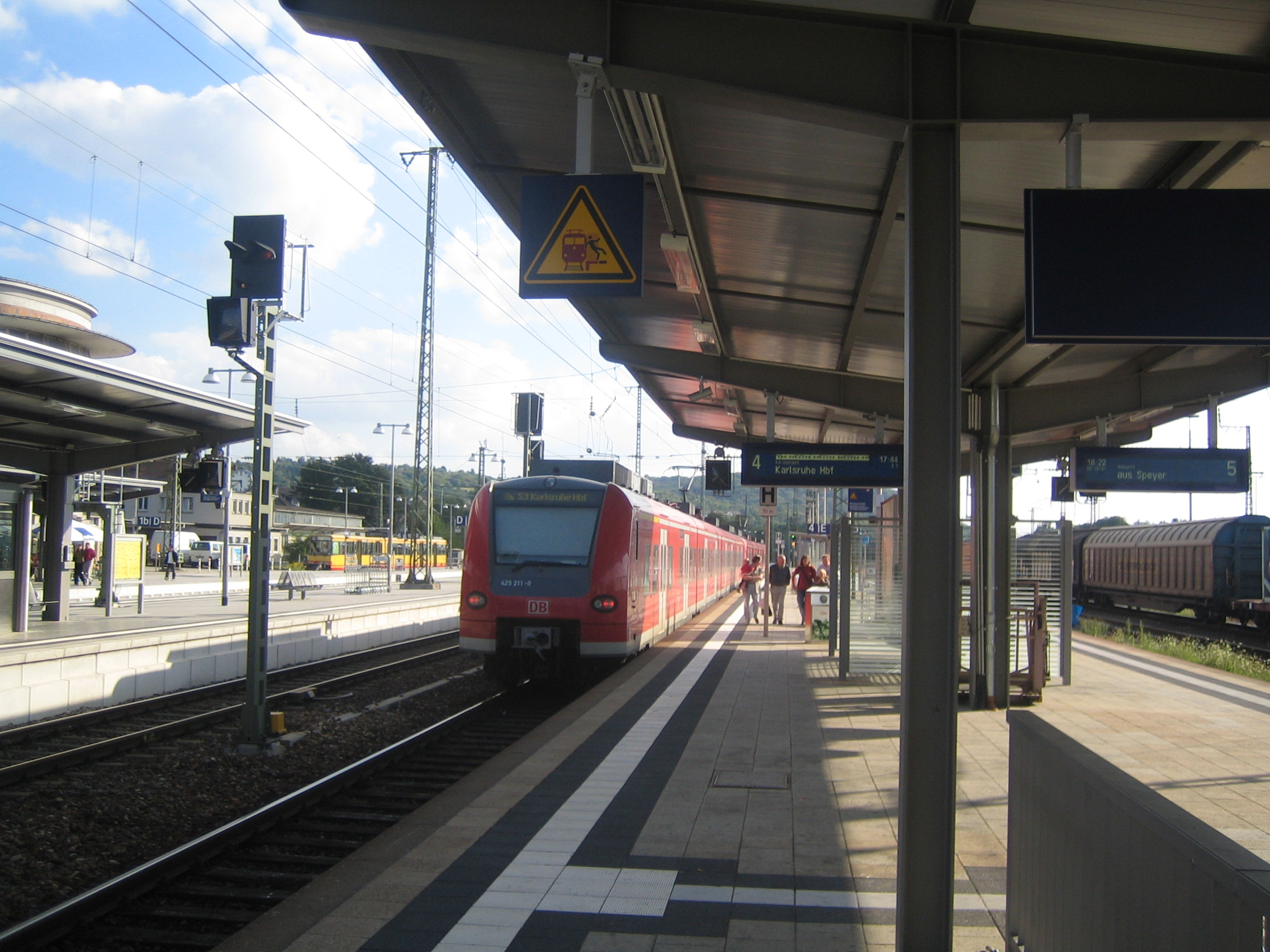
Bruchsal station

The railway on the German side of the Rhine was financed and built by the Grand Duchy of Baden State Railway (Großherzogliche Badische Staatsbahn). At the enactment of the Baden law permitting the construction of the Baden main line on 28 March 1838, only the starting point in Mannheim and the end point in Basel had been determined. The route was determined by the Technischen Baukommission (“Technical Building Commission”), which was formed in 1837. It adopted as its basic aims that the construction cost should be as low as possible as was consistent with good running times and that the line should be built as straight as possible to connect the major cities. It decided that the should be built, if possible, in the Upper Rhine Plain. The first section between Mannheim and Heidelberg was opened in 1840 and the line was completed in several section to Basel until 1855. The first route designs provided for a route from Heidelberg via Schwetzingen to Karlsruhe. After the then third largest city in the Grand Duchy of Baden, Bruchsal learned of these plans, the Baden Parliament sat to consider a connection via Bruchsal and Durlach. On 2 January 1846, two trains ran into each other in St. Ilgen, a village near Leimen. One person died and 16 others were injured. This was one of the first fatalities in a rail accident in Germany.

The line was originally built to 5 ft 3 in (1,600 mm) Irish gauge, but since the surrounding countries built their railways to 1,435 mm (4 ft 8 1/2 in) standard gauge, the line was converted to standard gauge between 1854 and 1855.

Date	Start of section	End of section
12 September 1840	Mannheim Hbf	Heidelberg Hbf
10 April 1843	Heidelberg Hbf	Karlsruhe Hbf
1 May 1844	Karlsruhe Hbf	Rastatt
6 May 1844	Rastatt	Baden-Oos
1 June 1844	Baden-Oos	Offenburg
1 August 1845	Offenburg	Freiburg Hbf
1 June 1847	Freiburg Hbf	Müllheim (Baden)
15 June 1847	Müllheim	Schliengen
8 November 1848	Schliengen	Efringen
22 January 1851	Efringen	Haltingen
1855	Haltingen	Basel

Since Schwetzingen and Hockenheim were not on the line through Heidelberg, another line was opened in 1870 on the Mannheim–Schwetzingen–Graben–Eggenstein–Karlsruhe route. A shorter and more direct line from Graben to Karlsruhe via Blankenloch was added in 1895 as a strategic railway. This converted the Karlsruhe–Eggenstein–Graben section of the old line into a branch line, now known as the Hardt Railway and partly incorporated into the Karlsruhe Stadtbahn.

=== Developments in the 20th century ===
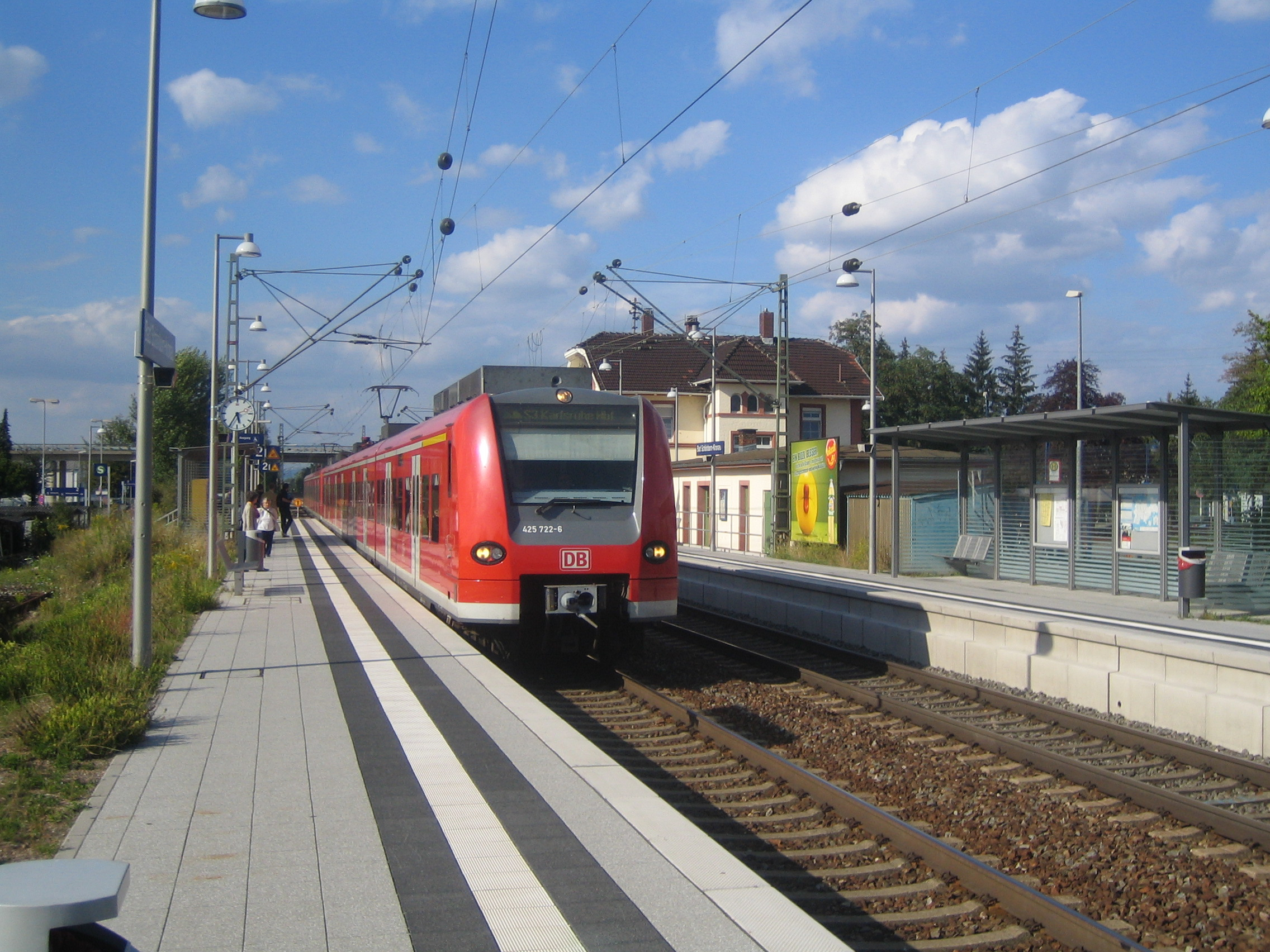
Bad Schönborn-Kronau station

In the northern section between Mannheim and Karlsruhe there are two different lines, the Mannheim–Graben-Neudorf–Karlsruhe line (the Baden Mainline as such) as well as the Mannheim–Heidelberg–Bruchsal–Durlach–Karlsruhe line (the Baden-Kurpfalz Railway). Particularly after World War I it became a major line for international traffic. Beginning in the 1950s, the Rhine Valley line was progressively electrified, with the line fully electrified by the middle of 1958.

In the late 1960s, a fundamental renewal of signaling installations began on the 120 km-long section between Offenburg and Basel. The line, which was previously equipped with mechanical interlockings—with the exception of Freiburg Hauptbahnhof—was converted to control by relay interlockings. By the late 1960s the line was already being used by well over 100 trains per day in each direction.

With the commissioning of the first section of the Mannheim–Stuttgart high-speed railway between Mannheim and Graben-Neudorf, the Rhine Valley Railway was relieved, making an integrated regular interval service possible. The signal boxes in Achern and Freiburg were built as electronic interlockings. The signal boxes at Leutersberg, Bad Krozingen, Heitersheim and Müllheim (Baden) have been modified under CIR ELKE and equipped with LZB.

The current Baden-Baden station was originally called Oos, between 1906 and the closure of the old Baden-Baden town station in 1977 it was called Baden-Oos and then it received its current name.

=== Developments in the 21st century ===
As part of the construction of the Karlsruhe–Basel high-speed railway, it was planned in 1990 to upgrade the railway between Karlsruhe and Offenburg for continuous operations at 160 km/h. Under a German-Swiss convention, the entire line was supposed to be converted to at least four lines by 2008, so that it could serve as the main northern approach route to the new Gotthard Base Tunnel line to Italy. As a result, Deutsche Bahn is building a high-speed line from Karlsruhe to Basel, including new and upgraded sections.

Between Karlsruhe and Rastatt two lines run relatively near each other, effectively providing four tracks. The double-track section between Rastatt station and Rastatt-Niederbühl is to be increased to four lines with the construction of the Rastatt Tunnel. Between Rastatt-Niederbühl and Offenburg, two new high-speed tracks have been completed next to the old double-track line. A new section of line from Schliengen to Haltingen between Freiburg and Basel, including the 9,385-metre-long (30,791 ft) Katzenberg Tunnel, was opened on 9 December 2012 to avoid a narrow, winding section between the Rhine and the Isteiner Klotz hills. The remaining sections between Offenburg, Freiburg and the Katzenberg Tunnel are still being planned.

== Operations ==
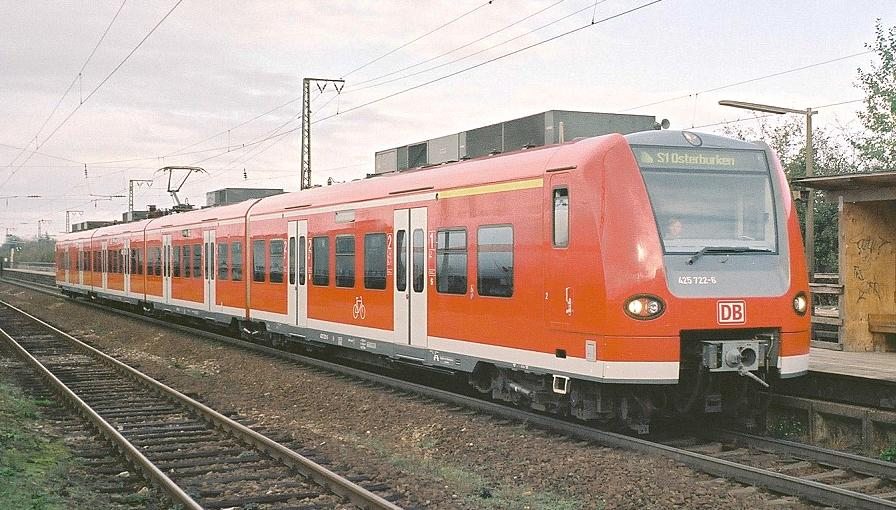
Rhine-Neckar S-Bahn train between Mannheim and Heidelberg

The Rhine Valley Railway is now one of the most important lines of Germany both for passenger and goods traffic, including international traffic to and from Switzerland and France. An investigation by the Hochschule Kehl (a school of public administration) estimated the traffic to be up to 286 trains a day.

The line is overloaded and was considered to have an occupancy rate of 126 percent in 2011. Trains have to run at especially close intervals. All long-distance services stop at Mannheim, Heidelberg, Karlsruhe, Freiburg and Basel Bad Bf, some stop at Wiesloch-Walldorf, Bruchsal, Karlsruhe-Durlach, Rastatt, Baden-Baden and Offenburg.

Since December 2003, line S3 of the Rhein-Neckar S-Bahn has operated on the Mannheim–Karlsruhe section of line and S4 (Speyer–Bruchsal) on the (Speyer–Karlsruhe) section. Lines S31, S32, S4 and S41 of the Stadtbahn Karlsruhe operate between Bruchsal and Achern. Lines S32 and S4 continue from Rastatt to Achern. Regional-Express (RE) services of the Black Forest Railway have run hourly between Karlsruhe and Offenburg since December 2009; at times they run every half-hour; RE and Regionalbahn services together provide a half-hourly service between Offenburg and Basel.

At each end of the line are two of the largest marshalling yards in Europe: Mannheim marshalling yard and Basel SBB marshalling yard in Muttenz. One marshalling yard of this line—in Heidelberg—has been closed and the new district of Bahnstadt has been built on its site. There are still DB freight yards in Karlsruhe, Offenburg, Freiburg and Basel. Karlsruhe freight yard is equipped with electronic interlocking and is controlled from the control centre in Karlsruhe. The other are still operated locally, some using electromechanical interlocking.

The double-track high-speed line through the Katzenberg Tunnel between Schliengen and Haltingen has been in operation since 9 December 2012. This will be complemented in the future by the segregation of fast long-distance passenger traffic and freight traffic in the Basel area. This will be made possible by the construction of another bridge over the Rhine on the so-called Connecting Line (Verbindungsbahn) between Basel Badischer Bahnhof (north of the Rhine) and Gellert junction (south of the Rhine).

The section between Schliengen and Haltingen via Bad Bellingen was completely renovated while it was completely closed in the summer of 2014. Its tracks, sleepers and the tunnels were renewed.

As part of the expansion of the operations of the Rhine-Neckar S-Bahn, a three-track section is planned between Mannheim Hauptbahnhof and Mannheim-Friedrichsfeld Süd. Any further quadruplication towards Heidelberg is at the design phase (as of 2012). In March 2014, the EU provided grants amounting to 30 to 40% of the cost.

Operations between Rastatt and Baden-Baden were blocked from 12 August 2017 as a result of subsidence caused by the boring of the Rastatt Tunnel under the line.

== Rolling stock ==
The long-distance services towards Hamburg and Berlin are operated with ICE 1 trains and towards Dortmund with ICE 3 trains. EuroCity and Intercity services are mostly hauled by class 101 locomotives and regional services consist of class 146 and class 111 locomotives hauling double-decker coaches or Silberling coaches.

In central Baden, the Albtal-Verkehrs-Gesellschaft (AVG) operates the Karlsruhe Stadtbahn services. Two system light rail vehicles of the GT8-100C/2S and GT8-100D/2S-M classes are used; some have toilets and panoramic windows.

In the Upper Rhine, Regionalbahn services often use class 425 EMUs and occasionally they are operated with class 111 locomotives hauling Silberling coaches. Südwestdeutsche Verkehrs-Aktiengesellschaft and the Breisgau S-Bahn operate Stadler Regio-Shuttle RS1 and Talent 2 EMUs. The Ortenau S-Bahn also operates Regio-Shuttle EMUs.

The Swiss Federal Railways operate Stadler Flirt EMUs between Basel SBB and Basel Badischer Bahnhof. SNCF operates TGV Duplex sets between Bruchsal and Appenweier and between Freiburg and Müllheim, stopping in Karlsruhe, Freiburg and some also in Baden-Baden.

== Rail services ==
=== Long-distance services ===
The Rhine valley Railway is traversed by several Intercity-Express and Intercity services.

Line	Route
ICE 12	Berlin – Braunschweig – Kassel-Wilhelmshöhe – Frankfurt (Main) – Karlsruhe – Basel (– Bern – Interlaken Ost)
ICE/ECE 20	Hamburg – Kassel-Wilhelmshöhe – Frankfurt (Main) – Karlsruhe – Basel (– Bern – Interlaken Ost)
ICE 43	(Amsterdam – Duisburg or Dortmund –) Cologne – Frankfurt Airport – Karlsruhe – Basel
ICE 60	Basel Bad Bf – Baden-Baden – Bruchsal – Stuttgart – Munich
ICE/TGV 83	Paris – Karlsruhe – Stuttgart (– Munich)
ICE/TGV 84	Frankfurt – Mannheim – Karlsruhe – Baden-Baden – Strasbourg – Mulhouse-Ville – Belfort-Montbéliard – Besançon – Chalon – Lyon-Part-Dieu – Avignon – Aix-en-Provence – Marseille-Saint-Charles
ECE 85	Frankfurt – Mannheim – Karlsruhe – Ringsheim – Freiburg – Basel Bad – Basel SBB – Olten – Lucerne – Arth-Goldau – Bellinzona – Lugano – Chiasso – Como – Monza – Milan
TGV	Freiburg – Emmendingen – Lahr – Offenburg – Straßburg – Paris Est
NJ	Hamburg – Hannover – Frankfurt – Mannheim – Karlsruhe – Freiburg – Basel – Zürich
NJ	Berlin – Magdeburg – Frankfurt – Mannheim – Karlsruhe – Freiburg – Basel – Zürich
NJ	Amsterdam – Köln – Mainz – Frankfurt – Mannheim – Karlsruhe – Freiburg – Basel – Zürich
FlixNight	Hamburg – Hannover – Karlsruhe – Freiburg – Lörrach

=== Regional services ===
The Rhine valley Railway is used by two Interregio-Express services and a variety of Regional-Express, Regionalbahn, S-Bahn and Stadtbahn services.

Line	Route
DB Regio
RE 2	Karlsruhe – Baden-Baden – Offenburg – Hausach – Villingen – Konstanz
RE 40	Karlsruhe – Rastatt – Gaggenau – Gernsbach – Forbach – Baiersbronn – Freudenstadt
RE 7	(Karlsruhe – Rastatt – Baden-Baden –) Offenburg – Lahr – Emmendingen – Freiburg – Bad Krozingen – Müllheim – Weil am Rhein – Basel Bad Bf (– Basel SBB)
RE 73	Karlsruhe – Bruchsal – Wiesloch-Walldorf – Heidelberg (– Mannheim)
RB 68	Frankfurt am Main – Darmstadt – Bensheim – Weinheim – Neu-Edingen/Friedrichsfeld – Heidelberg – Wiesloch-Walldorf
RB 26	Offenburg – Lahr – Riegel-Malterdingen – Emmendingen – Denzlingen – Freiburg
RB 27	Freiburg – Bad Krozingen – Müllheim – Weil am Rhein – Basel Bad Bf
RB 27	(Freiburg – Bad Krozingen –) Müllheim – Neuenburg
RB 41	Karlsruhe – Rastatt – Gaggenau – Gernsbach – Forbach (– Baiersbronn – Freudenstadt – Eutingen (Gäu) – Herrenberg)
RB 44	Karlsruhe – Rastatt – Baden-Baden – Bühl – Achern
Südwestdeutsche Verkehrs-Aktiengesellschaft
RE 10a	Mannheim – Heidelberg – Eberbach – Mosbach-Neckarelz – Bad Friedrichshall – Heilbronn
RE 10b	Mannheim – Heidelberg – Meckesheim – Sinsheim – Bad Friedrichshall – Heilbronn
S2	(Elzach –) Bleibach – Waldkirch – Denzlingen – Freiburg
S3	(Freiburg –) Bad Krozingen – Staufen – Staufen Süd (– Münstertal)
RB 20	Bad Griesbach – Oppenau – Oberkirch – Appenweier – Offenburg – Hausach (– Hornberg/Freudenstadt)
RB 24	(Offenburg – Appenweier –) Achern – Kappelrodeck – Ottenhöfen
RB 25	Offenburg – Appenweier – Kehl – Straßburg
Rhine-Neckar S-Bahn:
S1	Homburg – Kaiserslautern – Mannheim – Heidelberg – Mosbach – Osterburken
S2	Kaiserslautern – Mannheim – Heidelberg – Mosbach
S3	Germersheim – Mannheim – Heidelberg – Bruchsal – Karlsruhe
S4	Germersheim – Mannheim – Heidelberg – Bruchsal
S9	Groß-Rohrheim – Mannheim – Schwetzingen – Graben-Neudorf – Karlsruhe
Karlsruhe Stadtbahn:
S 31	Odenheim – Bruchsal – Karlsruhe – Ettlingen West – Rastatt – Freudenstadt
S 32	Menzingen – Bruchsal – Karlsruhe – Ettlingen West – Rastatt – Baden-Baden – Achern
S 7	Karlsruhe Tullastraße/Verkehrsbetriebe – Karlsruhe Marktplatz – Rastatt – Baden-Baden – Achern
S 71	Karlsruhe – Ettlingen West – Rastatt – Baden-Baden – Achern
S 8	Karlsruhe Tullastraße/Verkehrsbetriebe – Karlsruhe Marktplatz – Durmersheim – Rastatt – Freudenstadt – Eutingen im Gäu
S 81	Karlsruhe – Ettlingen West – Rastatt – Freudenstadt
Basel trinational S-Bahn:
S5	(Schopfheim –) Steinen – Lörrach – Weil am Rhein
S6	Zell im Wiesental – Basel Bad Bf – Basel SBB

In November 2015, the operation of a group of services called Netz 4 Rheintal, was tendered as three lots. The transport contracts for regional services on the line would cover a total of approximately 4.7 million kilometres per year and run from December 2019 to December 2032. The investment of €250 million has been earmarked for its new rolling stock, which must be suitable for the Katzenberg Tunnel.

In December 2015, the operational concept of a regional transport timetable between Offenburg and Basel was presented. It provided an hourly service over the whole route with stops at all stations as a backbone. In addition, two Regional-Express services would run every two hours: a faster regional train would run every two hours between Offenburg and Basel in less than 90 minutes, with stops in Offenburg, Lahr, Hebolzheim, Kenzingen, Riegel-Malterdingen, Emmendingen, Denzingen, Freiburg Hauptbahnhof, Bad Krozingen, Heitersheim, Müllheim, Weil am Rhein and Basel SBB. A slower RE would stop in addition at Orschweier, Ringheim, Schallstadt, Bad Bellingen, Efringen-Kirchen and Haltingen. For many stations, the number of train stopping would significantly increase.

The tendering of the Freiburger Y network (Netz 9b) is also provided.

The target concept for rail services in 2025 of the state of Baden-Württemberg, which provides—three trains each hour and in each direction between Offenburg and Freiburg and four between Riegel-Malterdingen and Freiburg—cannot be implemented because of the congestion of the line. The infrastructure needed for this is expected to be opened in 2031.

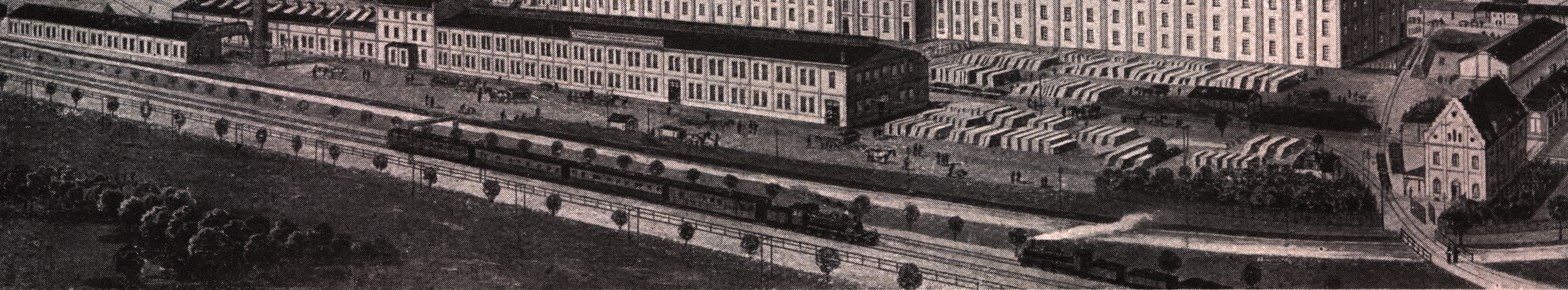
Southbound steam train parallel to the River Leimbach, with Tonwaren Industrie Wiesloch siding at the north end of Wiesloch-Walldorf station, c. 1925. The area would later contain the Wiesloch Feldbahn and Industrial Museum and Leimbach Park.
