= Leimbach (Rhine) =

River in Germany

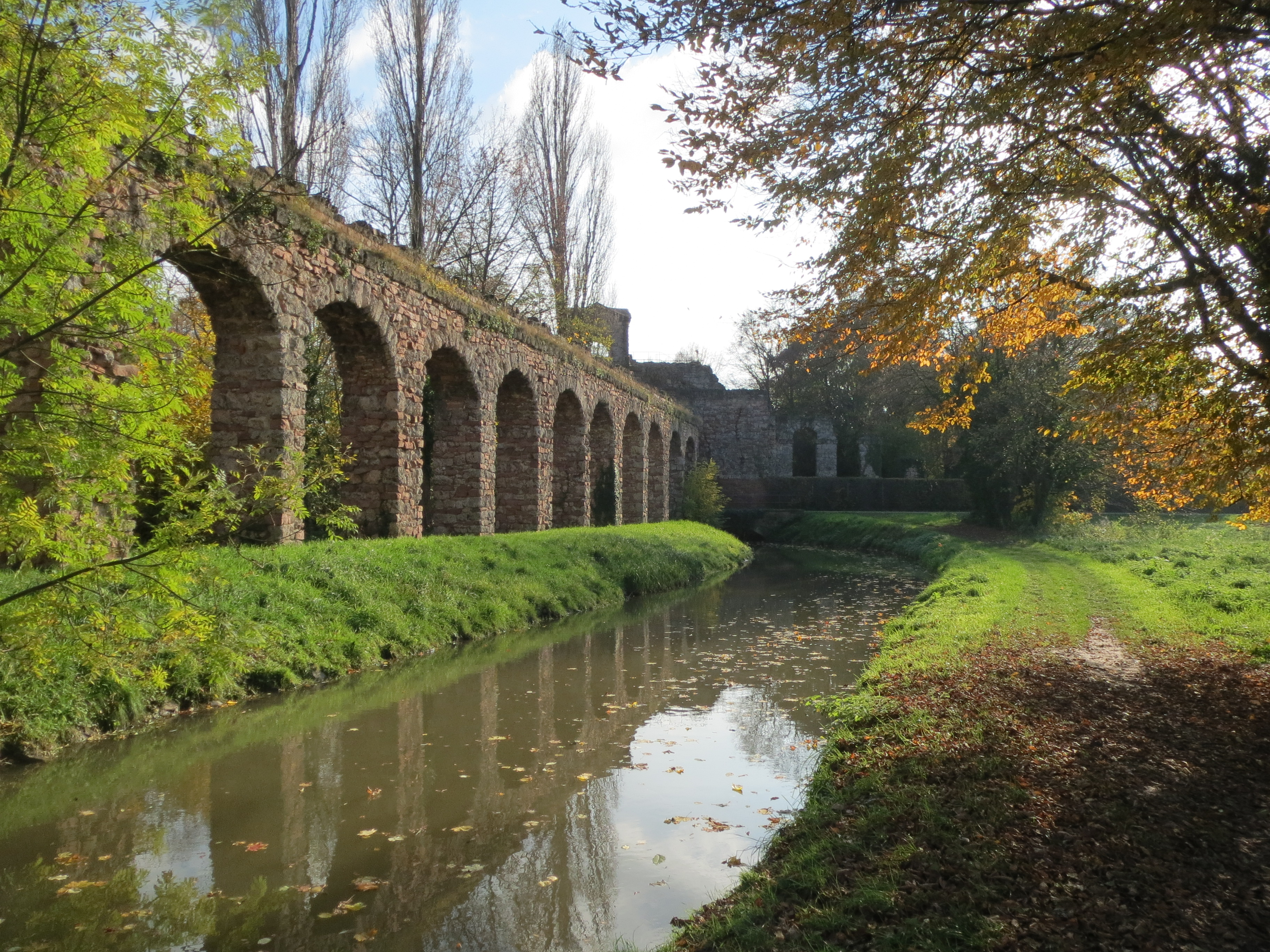

Location
- Country: Germany
- State: Baden-Württemberg

Physical characteristics
- Mouth
  - location: Rhine
  - coordinates: 49°23′46″N 8°30′00″E
- Length: 37.8 km (23.5 mi)
- Basin size: 200 km^{2} (77 sq mi)

Basin features
- Progression: Rhine→ North Sea

Leimbach is a river of Baden-Württemberg, Germany. It passes through Wiesloch, Nußloch and Schwetzingen, and flows into the Rhine in Brühl.

Between the cities of Wiesloch and Walldorf the river flows through the Leimbach Park linear-park close to Wiesloch-Walldorf station before flowing northwards between the Mannheim–Karlsruhe–Basel railway and Wiesloch Feldbahn and Industrial Museum.

== See also ==
- List of rivers of Baden-Württemberg
