= Leimbach Park =

Linear park in Wiesloch, Germany

Coordinates: 49.29267°N 8.66691°E

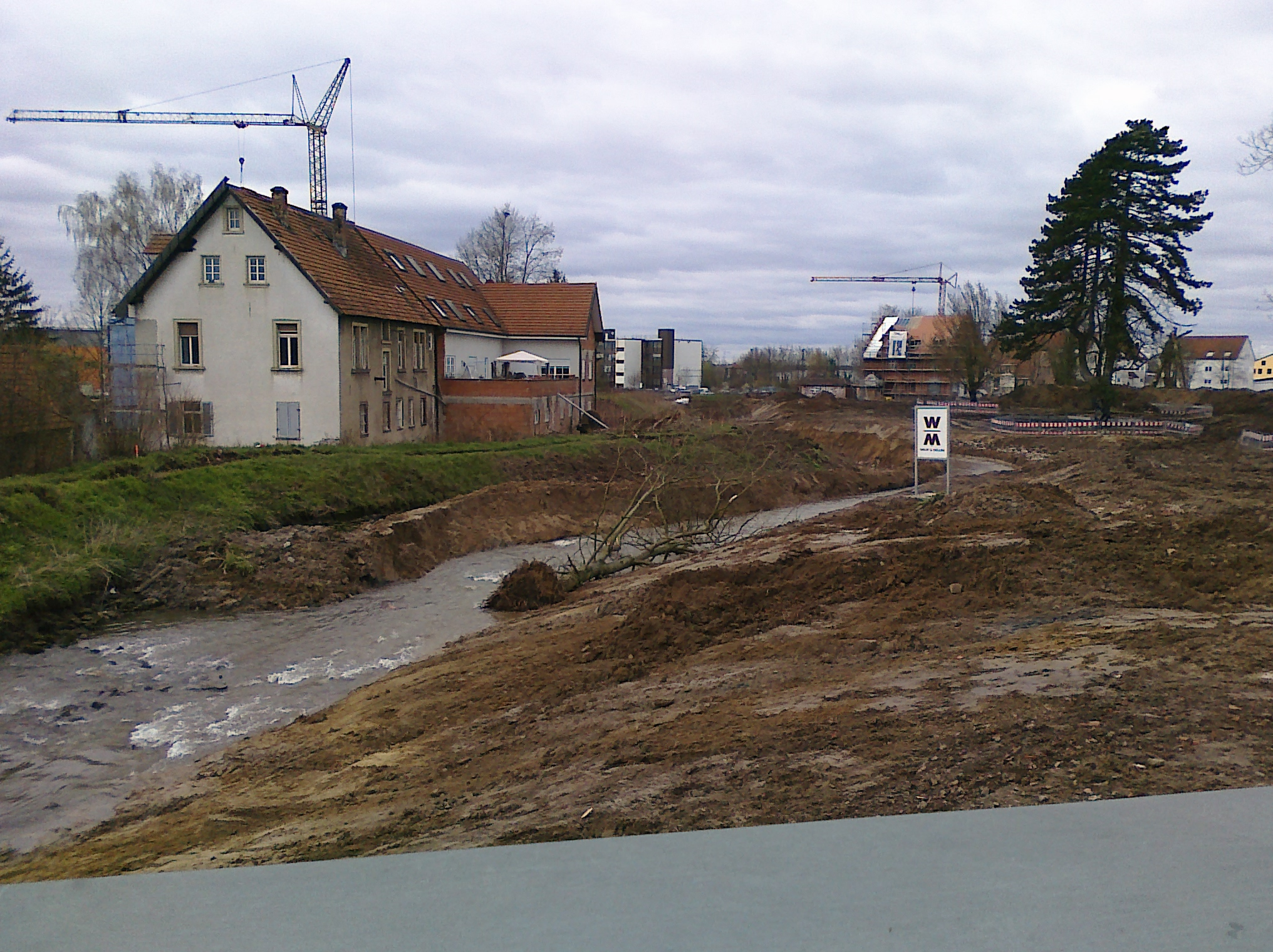
Park during construction, showing diversion of the River Leimbach around the old mill, viewed from "In den Weinäckern" bridge

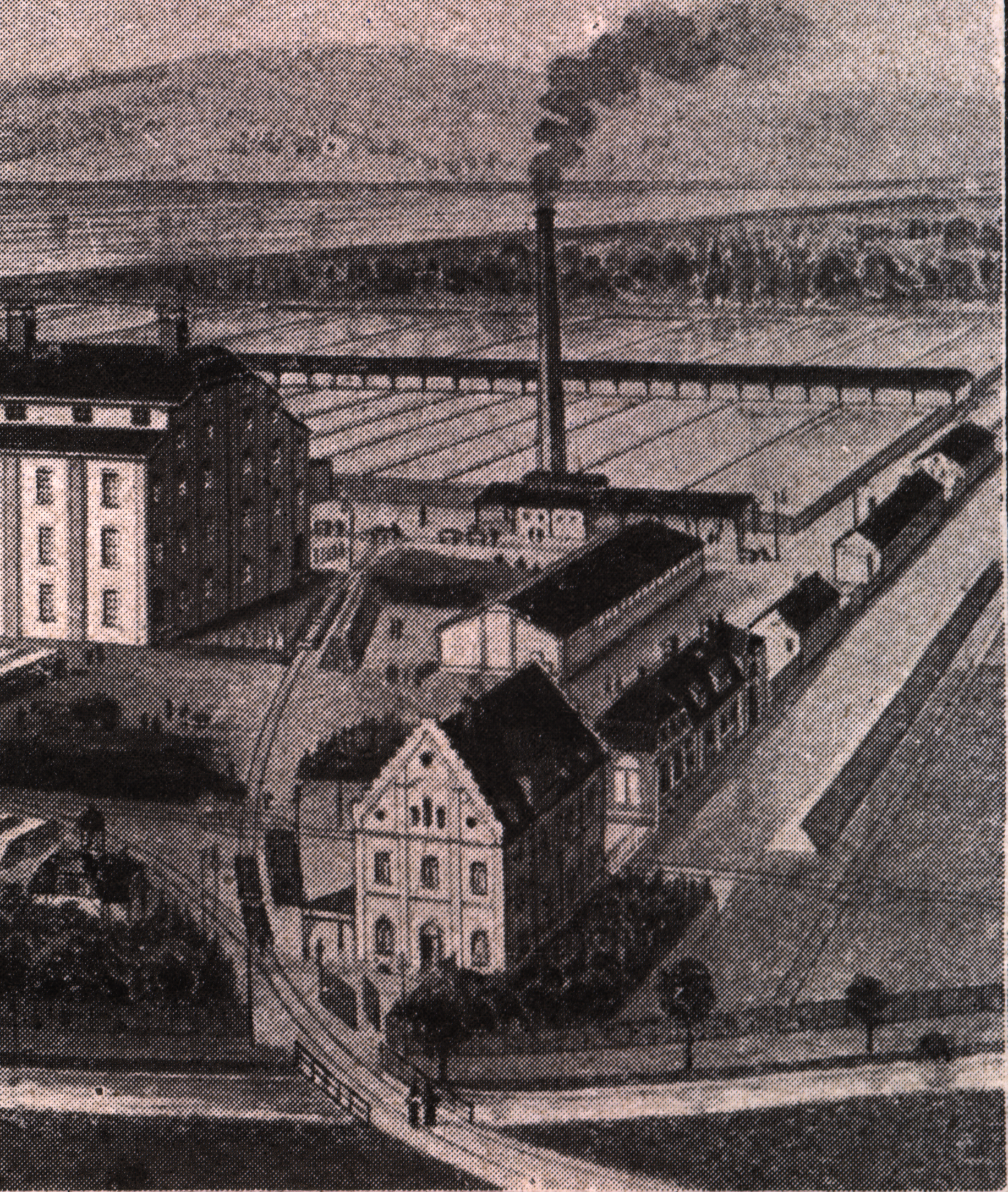
Administration building (Verwaltungsgebäude), bridge over River Leimbach and park area (bottom-right) c. 1925

The Leimbach Park (German: Leimbachpark or Park am Leimbach) is a linear park and 100-year flood prevention scheme opened in October 2016 in Wiesloch, Germany. It is part of a larger ecological enhancement of the River Leimbach. The park follows the River Leimbach downstream from Wiesloch to a larger 1.4-hectare (3.5-acre) area just north of Wiesloch-Walldorf station, part of the former Tonwaren-Industrie Wiesloch brickworks.

As of 2019 a narrow-gauge railway track connection runs northwards from the Leimbach Park, via the Landratsamt district government office to the Wiesloch Feldbahn and Industrial Museum.

== Planning ==
In the early 2000s a huge redevelopment of the land around that station was planned, including a pair of parks either side of the railway line:"Walldorf Park" and "Wiesloch Park".

As subsequently built, the park is section 2 of a larger three-section construction package on the upper Leimbach. In 2010, along with urban development in South-Walldorf, the park design won a "Landscape in Motion" award in a competition run by Rhine-Neckar Regional Association (Verband Region Rhein-Neckar) under their "Rhine-Neckar Regional Park" concept. It was recognised again in the 2012 Landscape in Motion awards, in connection to the Leimbach Route.

=== Bridges ===
The former railway lift bridge forms the north edge of the park and the border between section 1 and section 2, while the "In den Weinäckern" road bridge forms the south edge of the park and the border between section 2 and section 3. These three sections are themselves part of Measure 3 of the flood control works along the upper Leimbach. The tendered construction works for the parks included 12,000 cubic metres of earth-moving, placement of 200 tonnes of stone/gravel, 2,000 square-metres of road construction, 90 cubic metres of reinforced concrete, and creation of a simple Aluminium cycle path and footbridge to replace the two larger bridges being removed.

=== Tonwarenindustrie buildings ===
In 2006 two plots of land at the north corner of the future park were made available for sale by the City of Wiesloch: the former TIW Director's House (Direktorenvilla) at Adelsförsterpfad 12 dating from 1928, and the former TIW main administrative building (Verwaltungsgebäude) at Adelsförsterpfad 14 dating from 1899. During 2013 the former administration building was sold to Barbara and Thomas Oestreich; then renovated with new floors and ceiling, and the demolition of previous extensions.

The former administration building had been the site of a joint-fire drill by the firefighters of Wiesloch and Walldorf in June 2002, but later genuinely caught fire on 22 August 2015.

=== Commercial buildings ===
In March 2012 two further plots of land covering 143,000 square metres (14.3 ha) to the east of the park area were made available. The land was brownfield without buildings and the parcels were for put up for sale by the City of Wiesloch under its MetropolPark Wiesloch-Walldorf brand, designated for future for commercial use in minimum of 1,500-square-metre (0.15 ha) parcels.

=== Sports ===
On 23 June 2013 two local urban golf teams from Walldorf and Wiesloch offered introductory taster courses in the sport as a way to explore the area designated for the future Leimbach Park.

=== Budget ===
Plans and details of the 70%–15%–15% budget split between Baden-Württemberg, Wiesloch and Walldorf, were presented at a meeting in Wiesloch on 29 March 2011. There was an open meeting of the Walldorf city council about the flood protection works on 20 January 2015. The plans were presented to the public in Wiesloch at a meeting on 23 March 2015. The meeting was chaired by Peter Henigin. It was planned that in late-2016 the area around the park would be sown with wildflower seeds to form a meadow, following a positive experiment on Baiertaler Straße.

== Construction ==
On 10 March 2016, an official groundbreaking ceremony for the €1.5-million project took place with politicians Nicolette Kressl (de), Karl Klein (de), Dirk Elkemann (de), Kai Schmidt-Eisenlohr (de), Christiane Staab, and Mark Töllner of the construction company undertaking the work. Wiesloch and Walldorf were scheduled to contribute €215,000 each for the overall flood protection works, but with only Wiesloch funding the creation of the park itself. The completed design was intended to include seating and a playground.

On 5 April 2016 the 200 metres of the stream bed of the River Leimbach was diverted into a new channel 5 metres north-west of the old channel. Members of the local Kraichgau angling club performed a fish rescue, transferring fish and crabs to the new channel.

During construction the contractors had been using a temporary crossing of the river using buried pipes. On the morning of 17 April 2016 the temporary crossing became covered by flood waters. The Wiesloch fire brigade were called and contractors were called out to create a relief channel.

=== Bridges ===
Two bridges were removed, the "Lifting Bridge" and the "Isopor-Bridge", with the intention for one replacement bridge. The previous vertical-lift bridge (Hubbrücke) for the mainline railway connection from Wiesloch-Walldorf station to the industrial area had been previously raised permanently above the high water level—later the lifting bridge span was removed from the site completely. On 7 March 2016 the footpath between the railway station and the Landratsamt district office was closed to allow demolition of the second bridge to allow widening of the river channel, and afterwards this would be replaced by a new foot and cycle bridge over the River Leimbach. The second bridge had been constructed by the company "Isopor" which had also committed to take on the costs of any changes required later for the bridge if works on the river were required. After the Cities of Wiesloch and Walldorf purchased the land and bridge, they were deemed to be successors and liable for the costs for demolition and replacement.

The foot and cycling bridge on the new alignment was scheduled to cost €40,000, later lowered in price to €39,000.

=== Development ===
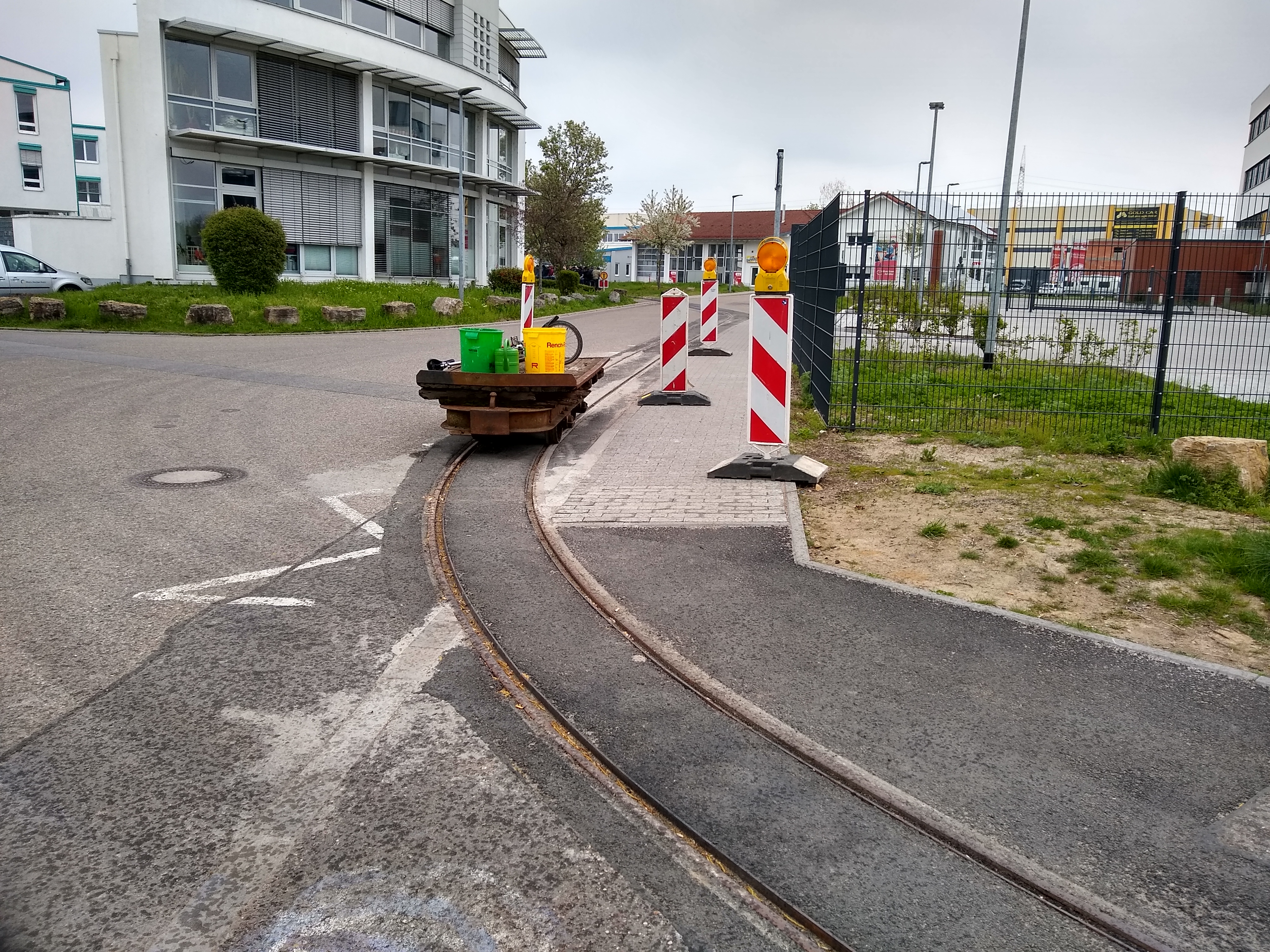
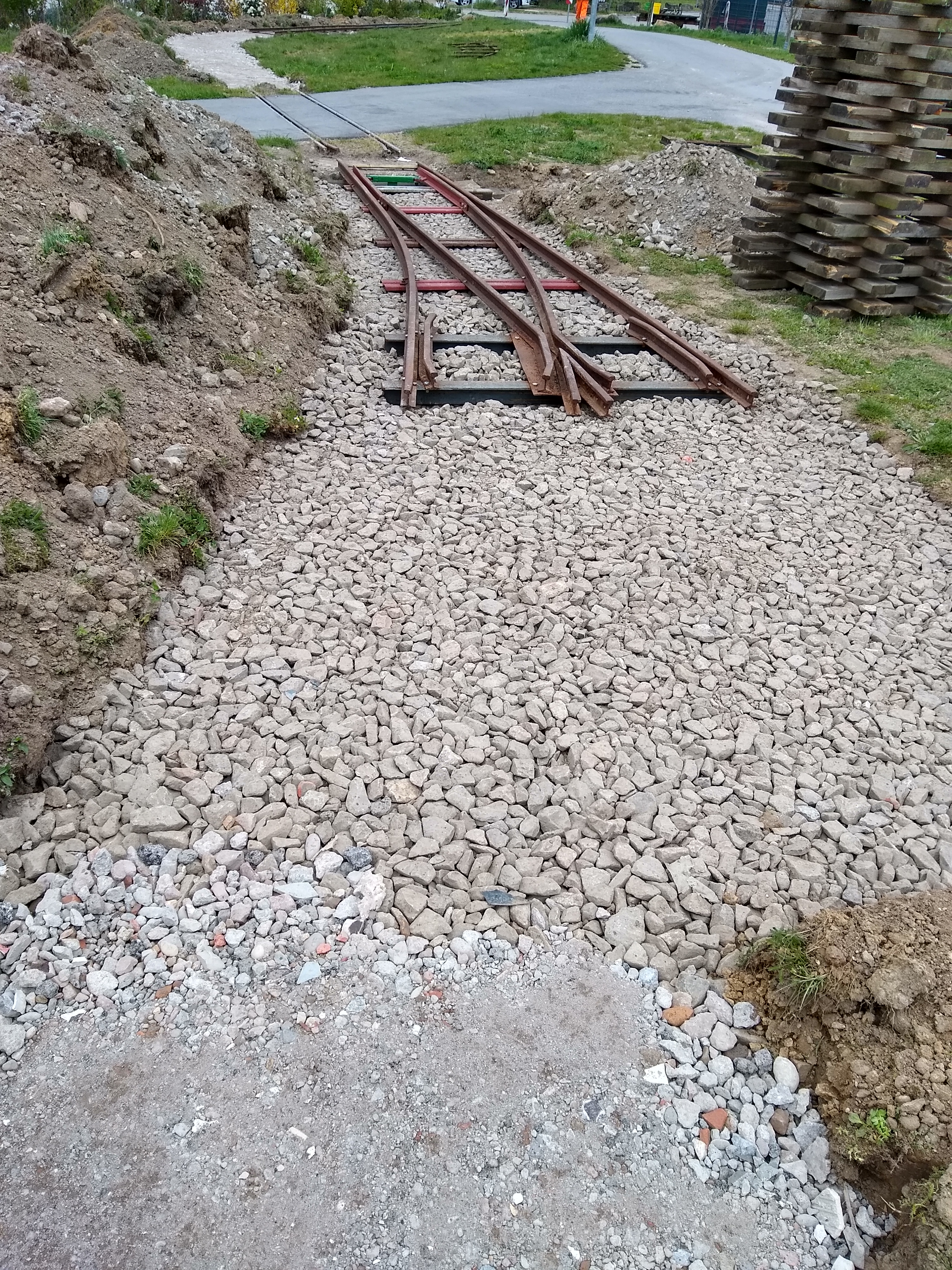
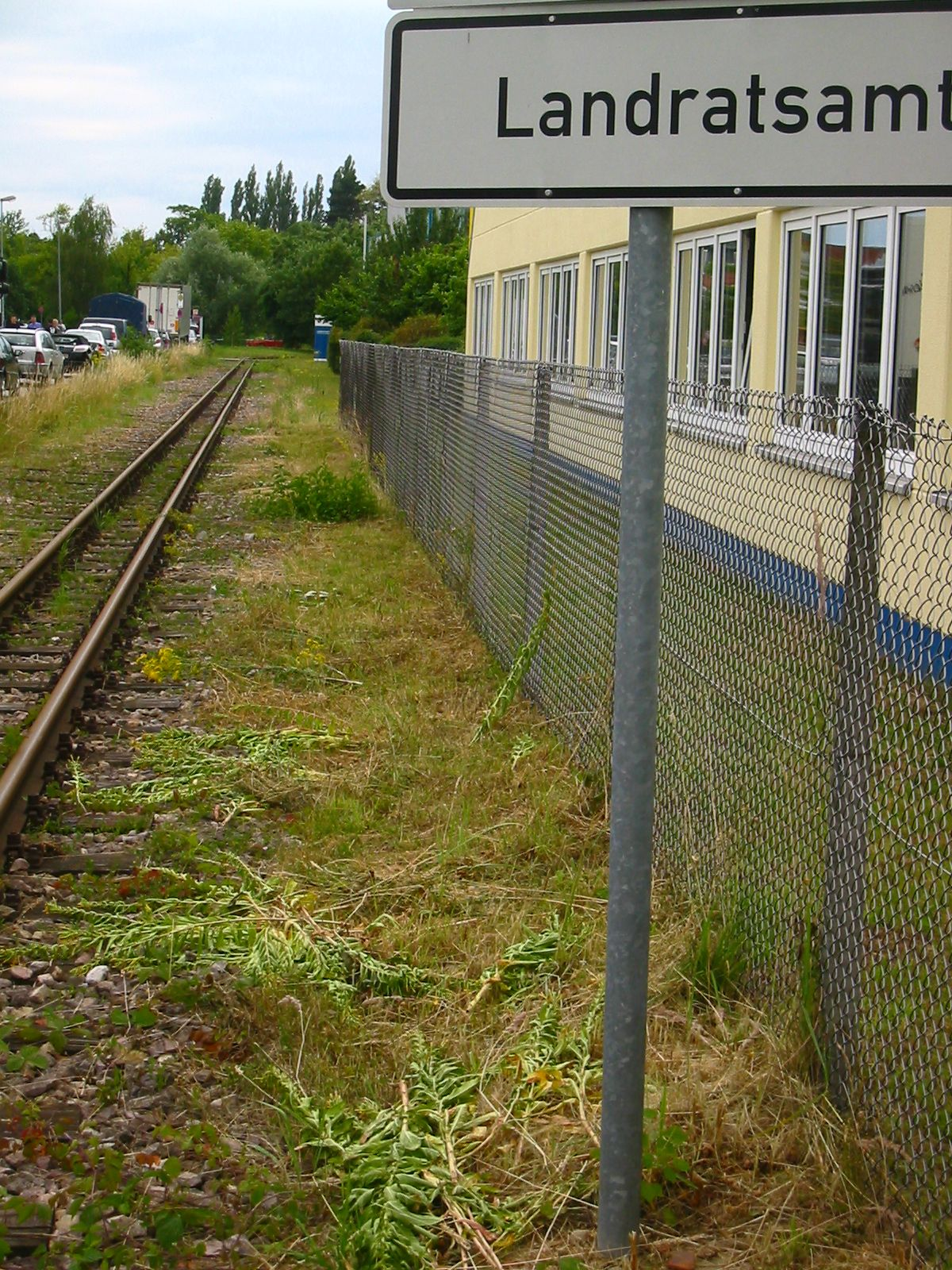
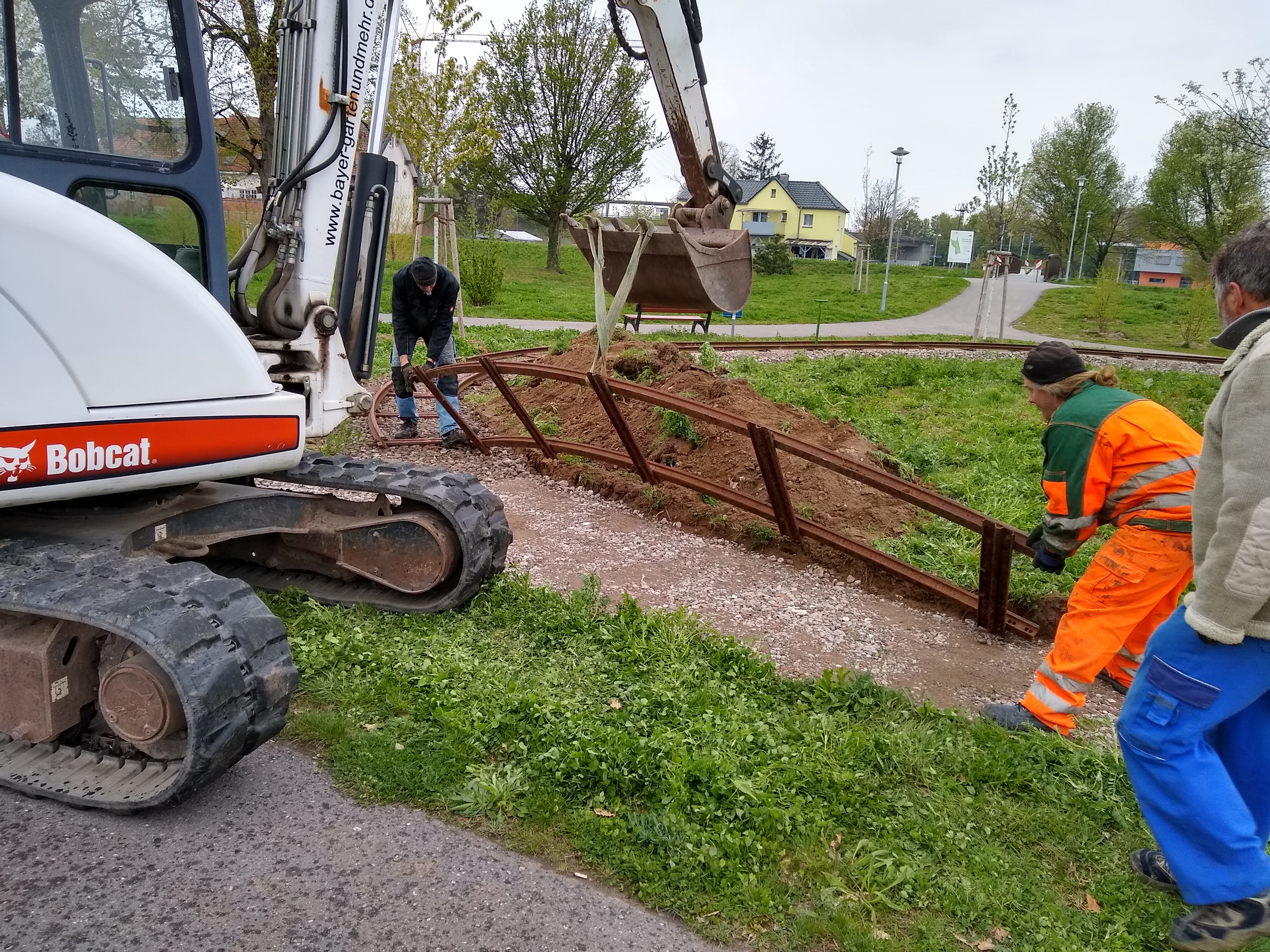
Landratsamt (district office) narrow gauge tracks, being extending from Wiesloch Feldbahn and Industrial Museum into the Leimbach Park during 2019

Following the construction on the Leimbach Park, the remaining surrounding plots of land from the former Tonwaren Industrie Wiesloch estate were sold for development use. Bicycle retailer Bike o‘bello Radsportversand purchased 6,300 square metres (0.63 ha) to construct a new building. Other buildings being redeveloped were the TIW Administration building and the former water-powered Dorn Mill (Dornmühle).

As of 2016, the narrow gauge tracks leading from the Wiesloch Feldbahn and Industrial Museum ended at the road crossing at the north entrance of the Leimbach Park. The extension of the track into the Leimbach Park was agreed by the Environment and Technical committee of the City of Wiesloch in January 2017. The proposal would use grassed track in the meadow areas of the park. The track extension was discussed by the cities of Walldorf and Wiesloch during the meeting of the Zweckverband Metropolpark Wiesloch-Walldorf joint association on 16 March 2017.

On 19 May 2019, the new track connection to the park was officially opened by Mayor of Walldorf Christine Staab and Mayor of Wiesloch Ludwig Sauer during the joint "Day of the Open Gardens" organised by both towns. During the ceremony a golden nut and bolt were installed before the ribbon was cut and the first train was driven over the new track. The new extension includes a balloon loop in the park close to Wiesloch-Walldorf station. The roundtrip journey for passengers was increased by 280 metres.

== Park opening ==
In May 2017 public benches were installed in the park. The benches had been sponsored by local companies and individuals from nearby Wiesloch, including the company Physio Therapie Moroni that backs on to the park; and the construction company Wolff & Müller that had built the park.
