= Wiesloch-Walldorf station =

Railway station in Germany

Wiesloch-Walldorf
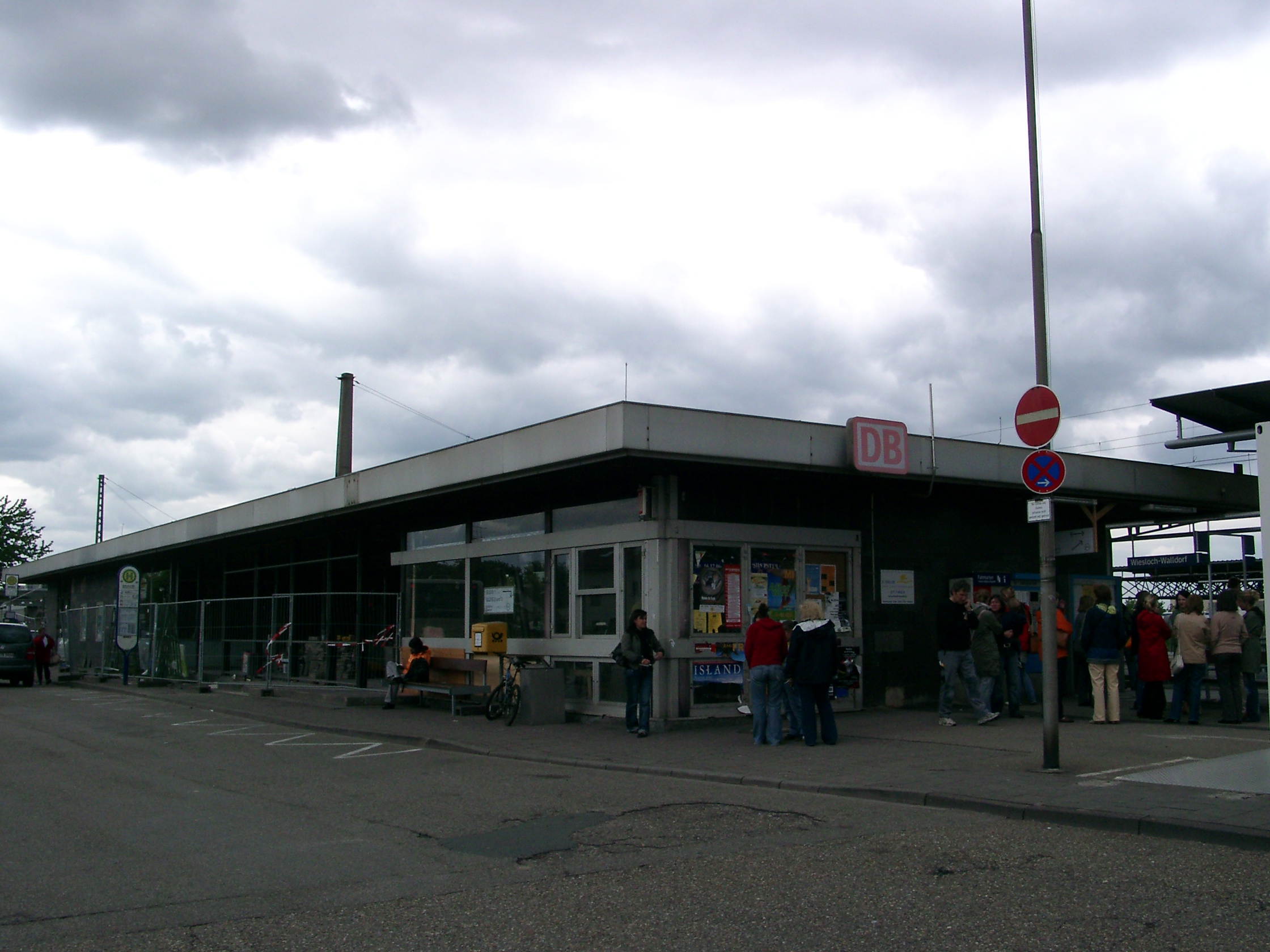

General information
- Location: Wiesloch, Baden-Württemberg; Germany
- Coordinates: 49°17′27″N 8°39′51″E
- Owner: Deutsche Bahn
- Operator: DB Station&Service
- Lines: Rhine Valley Railway (KBS 701)
- Platforms: 3 (1-3)

Construction
- Accessible: Yes

Other information
- Station code: 6759
- DS100 code: RWS
- Category: 3
- Fare zone: VRN: 155 and 165
- Website: www.bahnhof.de

History
- Opened: 1843

Services
| Preceding station | DB Fernverkehr | Following station |
|---|---|---|
| Heidelberg Hbf One-way operation | ICE 13 | Stuttgart Hbf Terminus |
| Heidelberg Hbf One-way operation | ICE 13 | Bruchsal towards Karlsruhe Hbf |
| Bruchsal towards Karlsruhe Hbf | ICE 26 | Heidelberg Hbf towards Bremen Hbf |
| Bruchsal One-way operation | IC 34 | Heidelberg Hbf towards Dortmund Hbf |
| Preceding station | DB Regio Mitte | Following station |
| Bad Schönborn-Kronau towards Karlsruhe Hbf | RE 73 | Heidelberg Hbf Terminus |
| St Ilgen-Sandhausen towards Frankfurt (Main) Hbf | RB 68 | Terminus |
| Preceding station | (Offenburg) | Following station |
| Bruchsal towards Mühlacker | RE 71 | Heidelberg Terminus |
| Preceding station | Rhine-Neckar S-Bahn | Following station |
| St Ilgen-Sandhausen towards Germersheim | S3 | Rot-Malsch towards Karlsruhe Hbf |
Location

Wiesloch-Walldorf station is in the towns of Wiesloch and Walldorf in the German state of Baden-Württemberg. The station is classified by Deutsche Bahn as a category 3 station. Leimbach Park and the Wiesloch Feldbahn and Industrial Museum are located to the north of the station, with the headquarters of Heidelberger Druckmaschinen and SAP SE on the south-western side.

== History ==
=== 19th century ===
The Karlsruhe—Heidelberg section of the Rhine Valley Railway was opened on 15 April 1843 as part of the construction of the Baden Mainline from Mannheim via Heidelberg, Karlsruhe, Baden-Baden and Freiburg to Basel, which was initially built to 1600 mm broad gauge. As a result, Walldorf and Wiesloch gained a connection to the rail network. A few years later the line was duplicated. Since the Grand Duchy of Baden State Railway’s broad gauge was not compatible with the gauge of neighbouring countries, it now feared the loss of lucrative transit traffic. Therefore, in 1854, Baden began to regauge its lines to 1,435 mm (4 ft 8 1/2 in) standard gauge and this was completed in just four months from Mannheim to Bruchsal.

=== 20th and 21st century ===
Since the station is located about three kilometres from both Wiesloch and Walldorf, both towns only gained a limited benefit from the line. In 1901, a private branch line, the Wiesloch-Meckesheim/Waldangelloch railway, was opened connecting the centre of Wiesloch with Wiesloch-Walldorf station. This line continued to Meckesheim, providing a connection between the Rhine Valley Railway and the Neckargemünd–Bad Friedrichshall-Jagstfeld railway. The services of this line operated from a platform in the station forecourt, where there was a connecting track to the state line. Passenger services on this line closed in 1980 and freight traffic was discontinued in 1990.

A tramway was built 1902 to connect to the town of Walldorf from the station forecourt, but it was closed in 1954. The station building was demolished sometime before 1990.

On Sunday 18 January 1959 a North American F-100 Super Sabre crashed a couple of hundred metres from the station.

In 2000, the Zweckverband Bahnhof Wiesloch-Walldorf (Administrative Association of Wiesloch-Walldorf station) was founded to promote the redevelopment of the station and the upgrading of the station's environment.

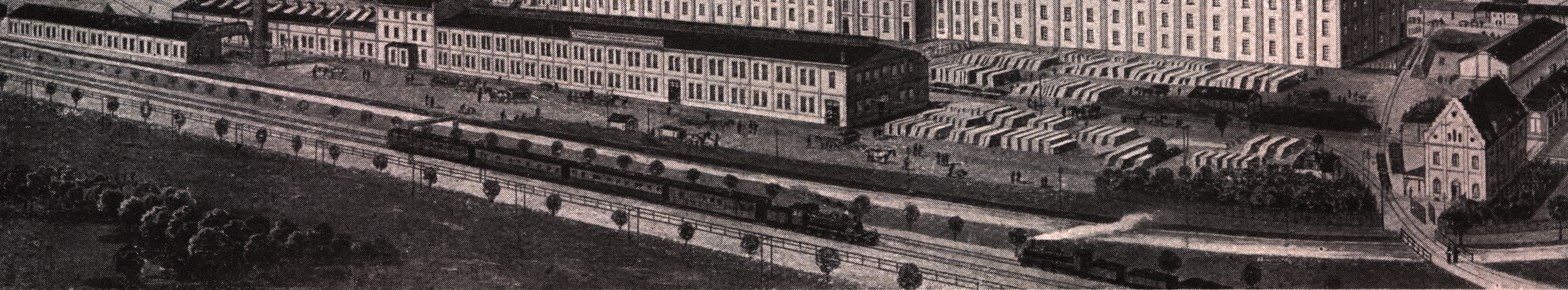
Tracks running parallel to the River Leimbach and Tonwaren Industrie Wiesloch factory, with a southbound steam train about to enter the station c. 1925. The area would later contain the Landratsamt, Wiesloch Feldbahn and Industrial Museum and Leimbach Park.

== Operations ==
Today, 135 long-distance trains stop at the station each week. It is served by trains every two hour on Intercity line 26 as well as some trains of IC line 87 and an Intercity-Express service. Regional-Express services stop every two hours on the route between Heidelberg and Stuttgart. The station is also integrated in the S-Bahn network of the Rhine-Neckar S-Bahn and is served by lines S 3 and S 4 at half-hourly intervals towards Heidelberg/Mannheim and Bruchsal/Karlsruhe.

== Rail services ==
In the 2026 timetable, the following services stop at the station.

=== Long distance ===
| Line | Route | | Frequency |
|---|---|---|---|
| ICE 13 | Berlin Ostbahnhof → Berlin → Wolfsburg → Braunschweig → Kassel → Frankfurt South → Darmstadt → Heidelberg → Wiesloch-Walldorf → | Karlsruhe | Every 4 hours |
| ICE 13 | Berlin Ostbahnhof → Berlin → Wolfsburg → Braunschweig → Kassel → Frankfurt South → Darmstadt → Heidelberg → Wiesloch-Walldorf → | Stuttgart | Every 4 hours |
| ICE 26 | Bremen – Hannover – Kassel-Wilhelmshöhe – Gießen – Frankfurt – Heidelberg – Wiesloch-Walldorf – Karlsruhe | | Every 4 hours |

=== Regional services ===
| Line | Route | Frequency |
|---|---|---|
| RE 71 | Heidelberg – Wiesloch-Walldorf – Bruchsal – Bretten – Mühlacker | 120 min |
| RE 73 | Heidelberg – Wiesloch-Walldorf – Bruchsal – Karlsruhe | 60 min |
| RB 68 | Frankfurt – Darmstadt – Hähnlein-Alsbach – Bensheim – Heppenheim – Weinheim – Neu-Edingen/Friedrichsfeld – Heidelberg – Wiesloch-Walldorf | 60 min (weekdays) |
| S3 | Germersheim – Speyer – Schifferstadt – Ludwigshafen – Mannheim – Heidelberg – Wiesloch-Walldorf – Bruchsal – Karlsruhe | 30 min |
