= Katzenberg Tunnel =

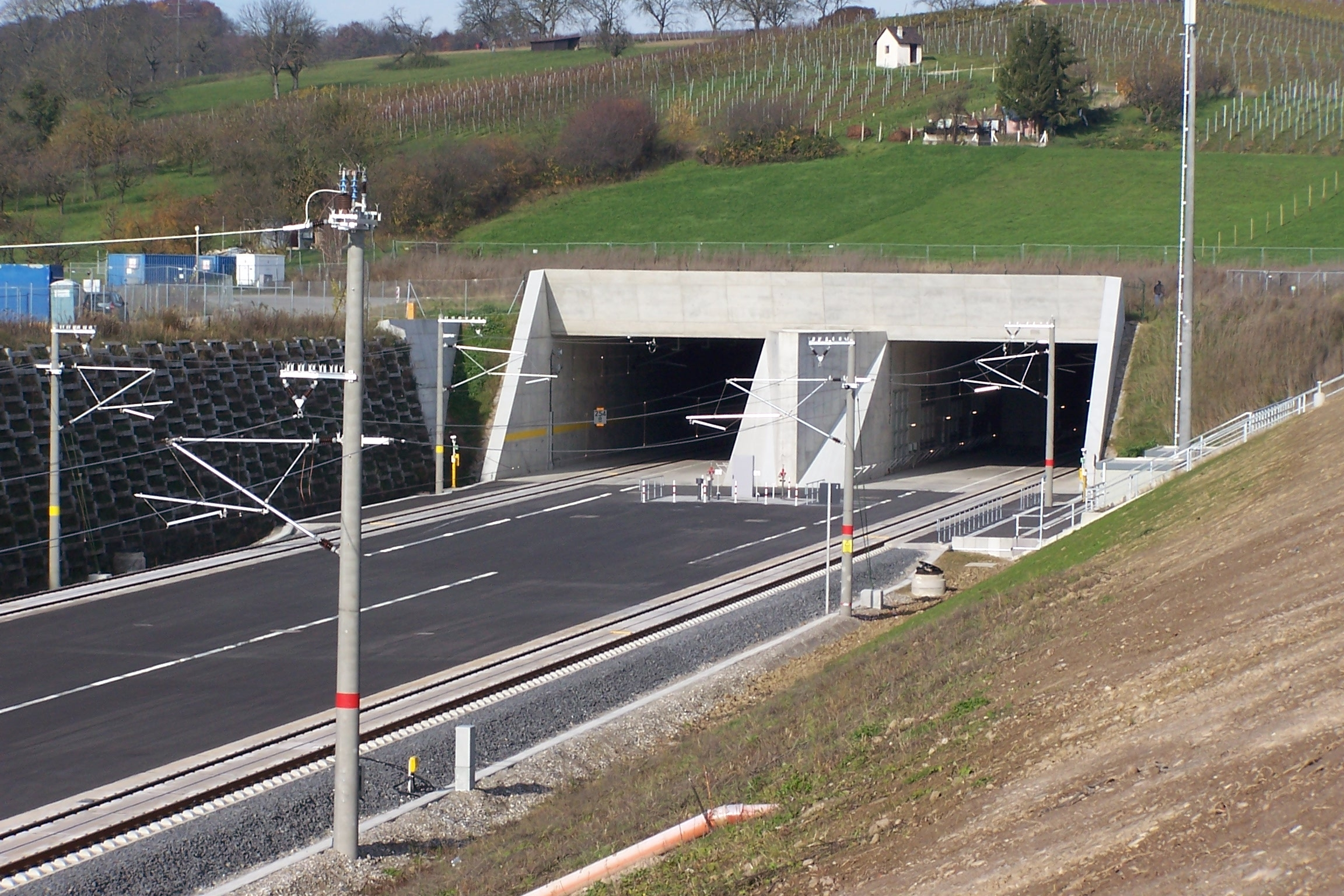
- The southern portal of the two tubes of the Katzenberg Tunnel
- Interactive map of Katzenberg Tunnel

Overview
- Line: Karlsruhe–Basel high-speed railway
- Location: Bad Bellingen and Efringen-Kirchen, Germany
- Coordinates: North portal: 47°44′32″N 7°33′37″E; South portal: 47°39′30″N 7°34′32″E
- Start: Bad Bellingen
- End: Efringen-Kirchen

Operation
- Work began: 2003
- Opened: December 4, 2012
- Owner: Deutsche Bahn
- Traffic: about 57 passenger trains(status: 2012) and about 160 goods trains (traffic on the existing route in 2007)
- Character: 2 bores

Technical
- Design engineer: DB ProjektBau; Lahmeyer International
- Length: 9,385 m (5.832 mi)
- No. of tracks: 2
- Track gauge: 1,435 mm (4 ft 8 1/2 in) standard gauge
- Electrified: 15 kV/16.7 Hz AC overhead catenary
- Operating speed: 250 km/h (160 mph) (max)

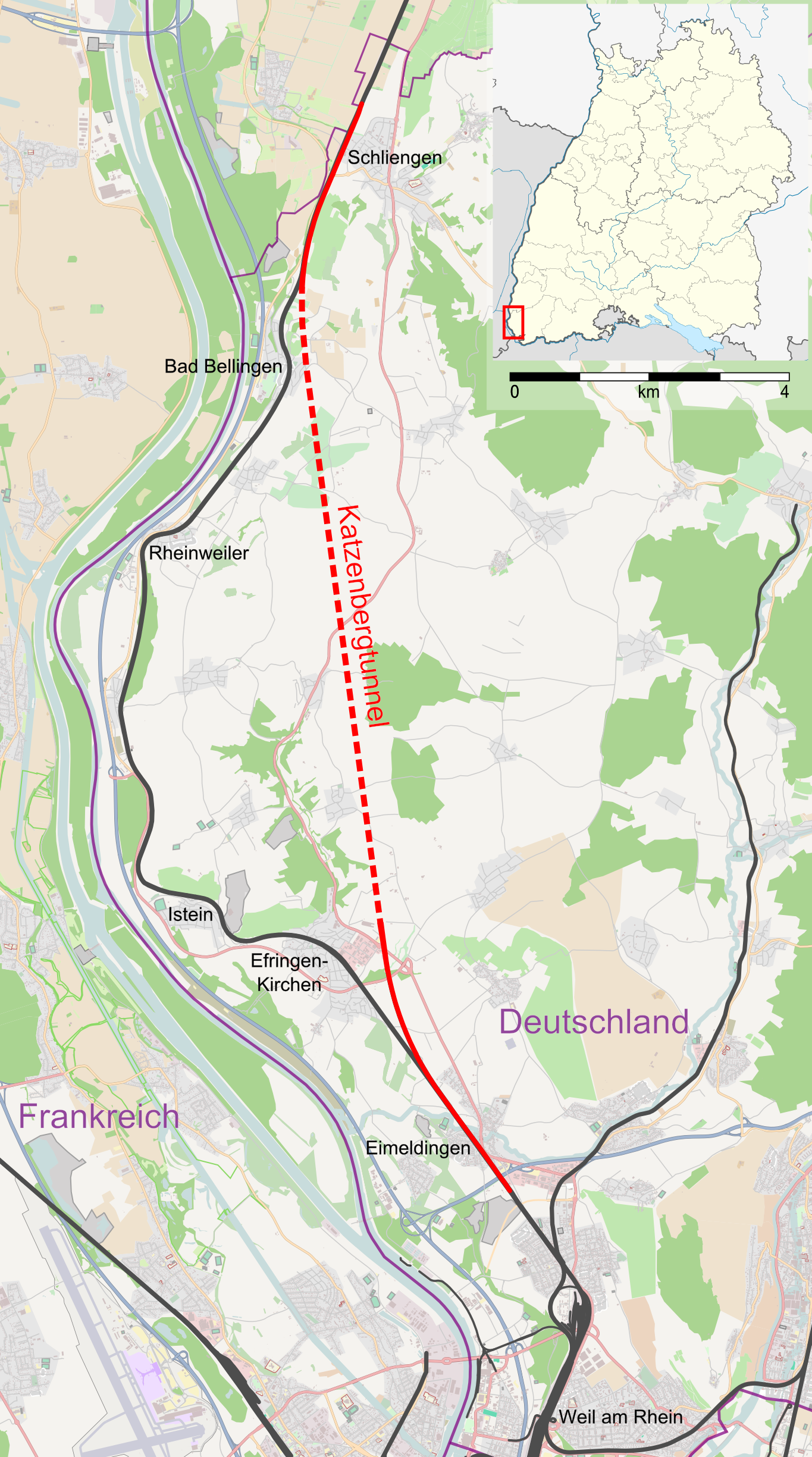
Katzenberg Tunnel and attached track (red) connecting to the existing line (grey)

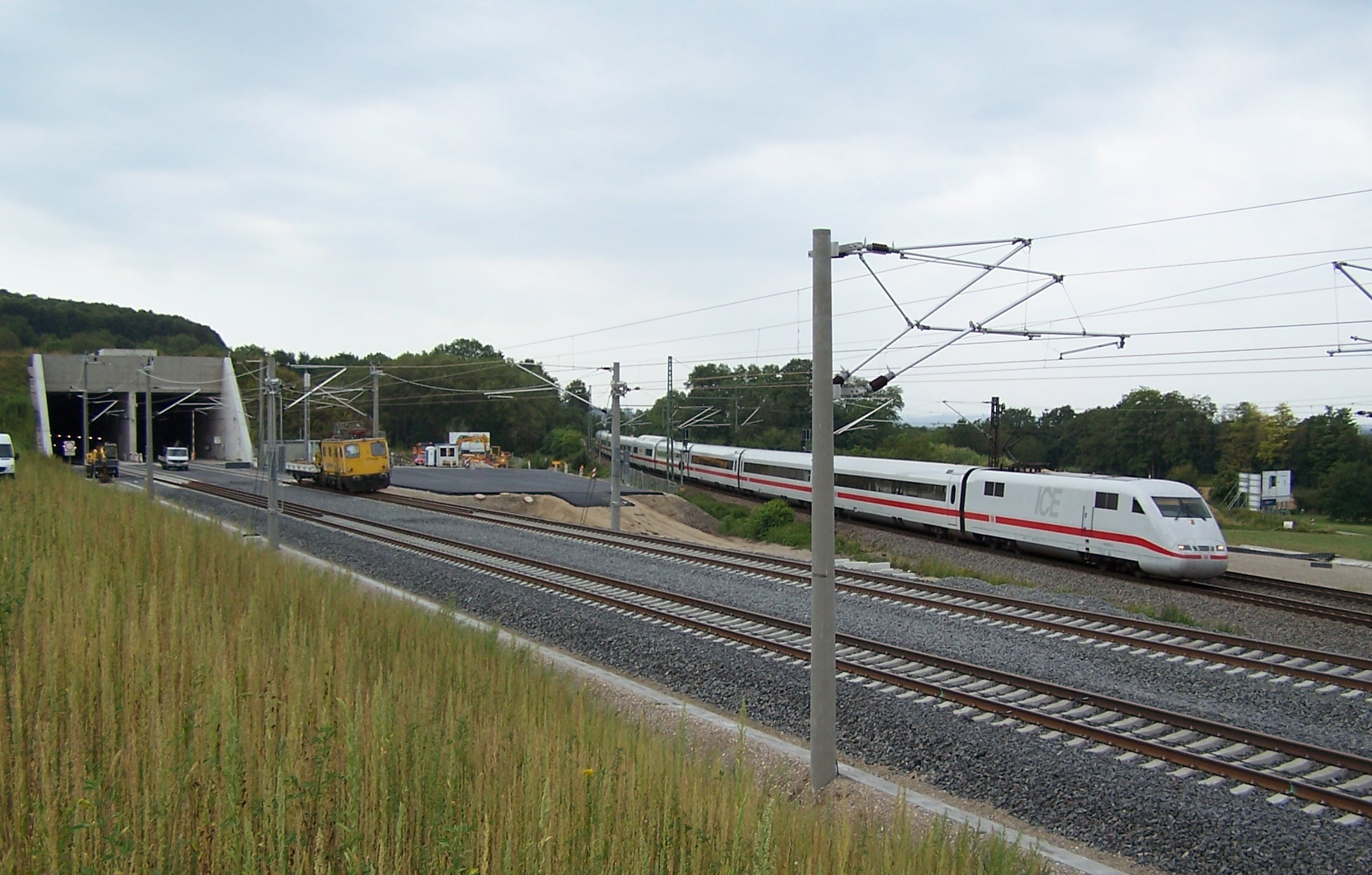
View of the north portal (August 2012)

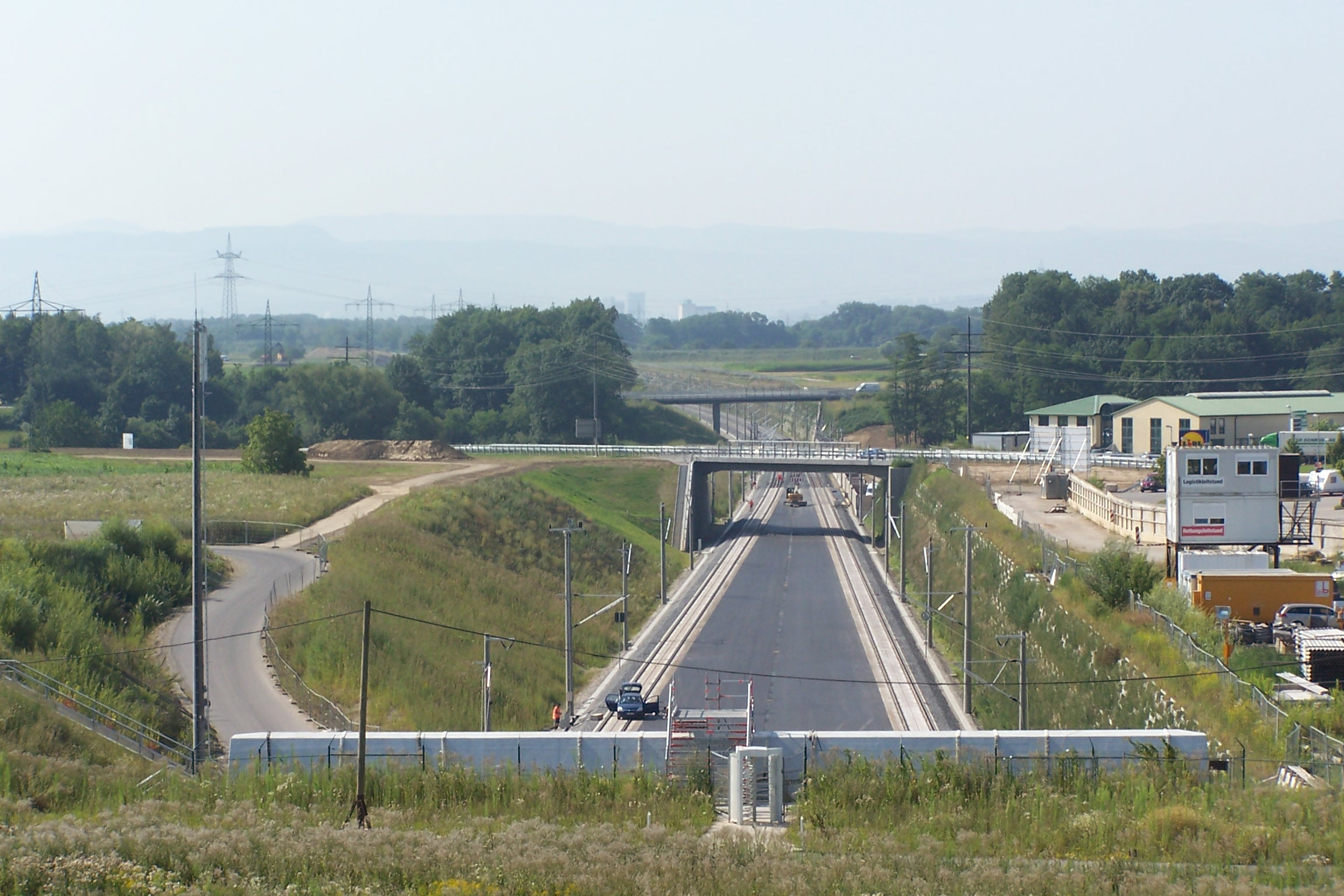
View of the south portal tpwards Basel (July 2012). The distance between track centres is reduced from around 25 m in the tunnel to the distance of 4.50m maintained on the open air sections.

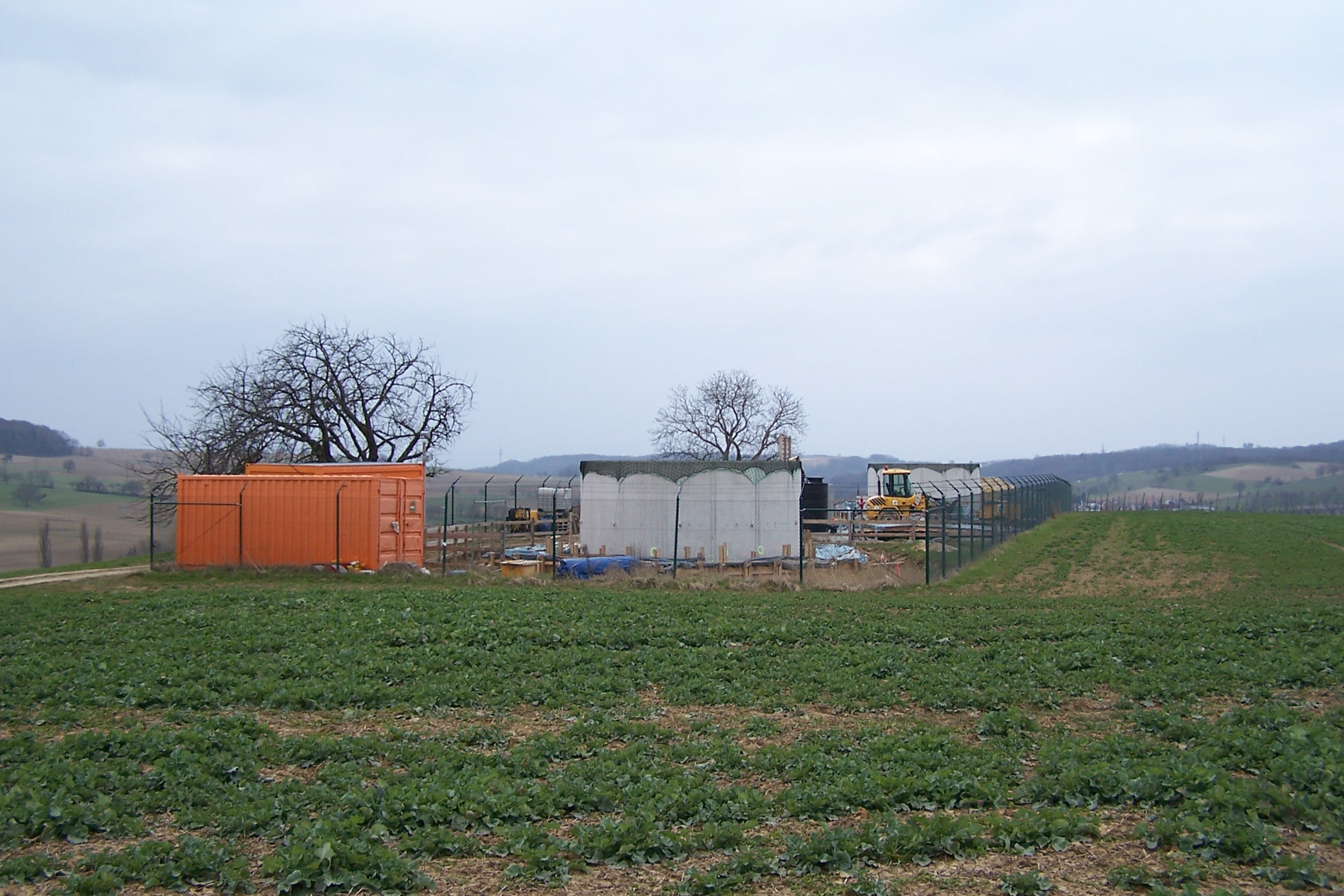
The ventilation structure of the eastern tunnel on the surface

The Katzenberg Tunnel is a railway tunnel on the Karlsruhe–Basel high-speed railway that opened in December 2012. The tunnel was built to increase the capacity and speed of the Mannheim–Karlsruhe–Basel railway (Rhine Valley Railway, or Rheintalbahn in German) and was built to remove the freight traffic from the towns on the old line. The two parallel, single-track tunnels, which can be passed at up to 250 km/h, extend from Bad Bellingen to Efringen-Kirchen With a length of 9,385 m, it is the third longest tunnel after the Landrücken Tunnel and the Münden Tunnel and the longest twin-bore tunnel in Germany.

The reduction in journey times for long-distance passenger trains between Freiburg and Basel initially amounts to two minutes. After the completion of the entire section of line, the journey time will be around 15 minutes shorter. At night a few freight trains and during the daytime many freight trains are routed through the Katzenberg Tunnel.

The tunnel and its connection to the existing network cost a total of approximately €610 million. The line was cleared for operations by the Federal Railway Authority (Eisenbahn-Bundesamt) on 4 December 2012. The opening ceremony took place on the same day. Regular operations began on 9 December 2012.

== Description ==
The tunnel is part of a 17.6 km-long section of new line and is situated between kilometres 245.410 and 254.829 of the old line (DB network route number 4280).

The tunnel is named after the Katzenberg (a mountain with a height of 397 metres (1,302 ft)), which lies about 1.2 km east-northeast of Wintersweiler and a few hundred metres east of the tunnel. It passes through the periphery of the Markgräfler Hügelland (Markgräflerland high lands) The north portal is at Bad Bellingen and the south portal is at Efringen-Kirchen. In its course, the tunnel passes through the localities of Hertingen and Bamlach (line km 248), Rheinweiler (km 249), Blansingen and Welmlingen (km 251), Mappach (km 252), Wintersweiler (km 253) and Efringen and Efringen-Kirchen (km 254).

With a design speed of 300 km/h, the tunnels are operated at 250 km/h. The route of the tunnel runs is straight along almost its entire length, although in the northern part of the route there is a curve with a length of 400 metres and a radius of approximately 4,000 m.

The standard distance between the two tunnels (track centres) is 26 m. The axis of the track lies 62 cm off-centre to create space on one side for an escape route. The two tunnels are connected by about 19 cross-passages at a spacing of approximately 500 m.

At the south portal there is an approximately four kilometre-long above-ground section, connecting with the main line of the Rhine Valley Railway at Haltingen (kilometre 264). A three kilometre-long above-ground section connects the northern portal with the main line at the station of Schliengen (km 243).

=== Altitude ===
The north and south portals are on almost the same level (around 250 m (820 ft) above sea level). The tunnels rise slightly towards their centre, which are about 16 m higher. The north portal is 253.73 m above sea level and the tunnels then initially ascend on a gradient of 0.1% for about 2,433.5 m and towards the centre, the gradient rises at 0.54% to the 3,280.8 m point. At this point, the tunnels reach their highest point of 269.43 m. To improve the ventilation, a 65 m deep ventilation shaft was built above the highest point of both bores near Gupf. They have internal diameters of six metres and their shafts end approximately three metres above ground level. They are protected with fencing and a safety gate. The tunnels then descend over a length of 4,964.8 m on a gradient of 0.35% to the south portal, which is at an elevation of 256.84 m, which is about three metres above the north portal.

The depth of cover over the tunnel is generally between 25 m and 110 m; the shallowest cover of 23 m is below Bundesstraße 3 (federal highway 3) near the 250.7 km point of the line and the deepest cover is at a point southeast of Bad Bellingen.

=== Geology ===
The tunnel mostly passes through the soft strata of the foothills on the edge of the Upper Rhine Plain, which have been subjected to different degrees of weathering. It was driven mostly through tertiary sedimentary rocks such as clay, marl and limestone, sometimes also sandstone. An exception is an approximately 800 m-long section at the southern half of the route that was drilled mainly through a form of Jurassic corallian limestone called Massenkalk.

The tunnel runs continuously, up to 90 m, below the water table.

== History ==
The original double-track line presented an obstacle to high-speed long-distance passenger transport because it followed the western edge of a steep ridge called the Isteiner Klotz and can only be operated at comparatively low speed due to the numerous curves in this area. So the maximum speed is 100 km/h at Bad Bellingen, 70 km/h at Rheinweiler, 80 km/h in three short tunnels near Istein and 120 km/h in Efringen-Kirchen. The original line is also about 3.8 km longer than the new line through the mountain.

=== Planning ===
Four route alternatives were presented as sketch plans for the planned line in 1974. The municipality of Efringen-Kirchen proposed a route through Alsace in 1978. In 1979, the director of the Karlsruhe division of the Deutsche Bundesbahn, Zimmermann suggested an upgraded line between Bad Bellingen and Istein with three new tunnels for speeds of 160 to 200 km/h.

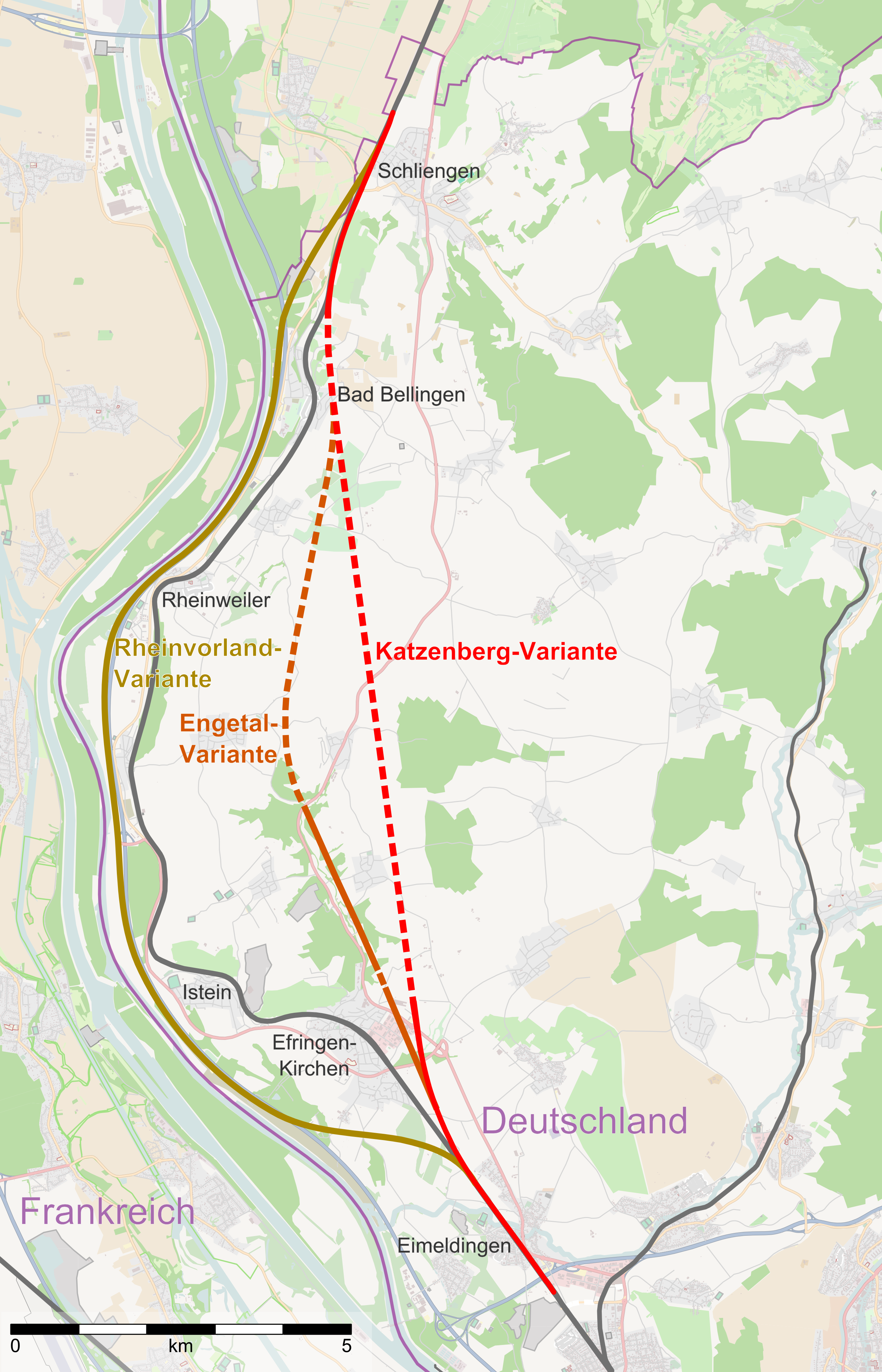
Route options

In the early 1980s, different options for the section between Schliengen and Eimeldingen were discussed: "Rhine foreland option" (Rheinvorlandvariante), a route that ran above ground and largely just to the east of the Rhine, had a top speed of 200 km/h and had substantial effects on residences. In addition, two options (Engetal—Enge valley—and Katzenberg) with tunnels up to 8 km long were developed. In addition, there was the "Zimmermann option", which involved the upgrading of the existing line. The Rhine foreland option, initially preferred by the Deutsche Bundesbahn, was subject to many different criticisms in the region. The Katzenberg tunnel option that was ultimately built was developed between 1977 and 1981 by the local engineer Albert Schmidt and his staff at their own expense. The proposal was taken up by former project manager Ernst Krittian.

The planning approval procedure for the Schliengen–Basel section, to which the tunnel belongs, was conducted by the council of the Freiburg region from 1987 and compared the Katzenberg and the Rhine foreland options with each other. In the same year, 40 holes were sunk between Efringen-Kirchen and Schliengen to explore the subsoil. Some holes were up to 140 m deep. In the planning decision of 24 February 1989, the Rhine foreland option was rejected and the Katzenberg option was preferred. The Katzenberg option was identified as the most environmentally friendly and economical solution according to information supplied by Deutsche Bahn. It was also planned to build the new line through Eimeldingen below ground level. During the construction of Autobahn 98 an abutment was built for a railway bridge. In 2002, it was finally decided not to build the line in a cutting, but to equip it with noise barriers instead, therefore, the abutments had to be demolished.

The project design of the 1980s had a twin-track section with both tracks in one tunnel. It was decided to use GPS for measurements carried out in late 1988 during the preliminary investigations. Because the GPS was not yet fully operational, it could only be used between 9 pm and midnight when there were sufficient satellites high enough above the horizon: even so the time required for the measurements was reduced by about three weeks from what would have been required using normal methods to nine days. During the planning process in early 1989 geological and hydrological investigations were already under way.

Initially it was planned that the new line to the southern portal of the tunnel would be covered for 400 metres. These plans were dropped in 1998 due to budget constraints; this was estimated to save about ten million marks. The total projected cost of the Katzenberg Tunnel at this time was 1.3 billion marks.

Due to a lack of committed funding, planning work was interrupted from 1990 to 1996. The planning approval for section 9, to which the tunnel belongs, was divided into three sections. The tunnel was assigned to section 9.1 of the planning work, which resumed and was completed in 1997. The plans were discussed with advisory bodies from the spring of 1998 and in the affected communities from the autumn of 1998.

In response to the changing specifications of the Federal Railway Authority (Eisenbahn-Bundesamt) for fire and disaster control, two single-track tunnels were now planned. The distance to a "safe area" (cross-passage or tunnel portal) could not exceed 500 metres and the two-tube tunnel would also need to be traffickable by road vehicles.

Due to changes in the Deutsche Bahn regulations and as a result of experience, the bores also could not be built with a drainage channel but were designed to cope with an expected water pressure equivalent to a water column of up to 90 m. This led to the adoption of a circular profile as an economic solution, which made the use of tunnelling machines possible. The preliminary design for the tender was for tunneling using tunnelling machines or shotcrete as alternatives.

The planning approval process ended on 22 November 2002. The use of tunnelling machines and shotcrete were approved in the same way. Circular cross-sections were provided for both methods. The shotcrete method would have involved an excavation from both portals and from an intermediate point, while a tunnelling machine would have been launched from the south portal.

The neighbouring municipalities initiated legal action against the planning decision; this included a demand that the line in Bad Bellingen be moved to the east.

As neither tunnelling method was technically much superior to the other, tenders were called for both methods. Four bidders submitted tenders, the highest tender was 21.1 percent higher than the lowest tender. Three of the four bidders offered a shotcrete as well as a tunnelling machine solution, which in each case was less expensive than the shotcrete solution. The contract for the construction of the tunnel, was finally awarded after several rounds of negotiations on 31 July 2003 to a consortium called ARGE Katzenbergtunnel. It was led by Ed. Züblin AG (Stuttgart) and the commercial management was provided by Wayss & Freytag (Stuttgart). Other important participants were the companies of Marti Tunnelbau AG (Bern, Switzerland) and Jäger Bau GmbH (Schruns, Austria). In addition, up to 123 subcontractors were involved in the construction of the project.

When the contract was awarded, the start of construction was expected in mid 2004 and completion was expected in 2007.

Herrenknecht AG (Schwanau) was responsible for the delivery of the two tunnel boring machines (TBM). They used earth pressure shields that used excavated material to support the tunnel faces. In addition to economic considerations, the use of tunnel boring machines was also due to the generally soft strata (which could not support the tunnel walls) involved, which required tunnelling in small increments with the immediate erection of supports and lining with concrete. Due to the water pressure, the circular cross-section created by the TBM was the optimum shape for a tunnel. The price for each machine was €17 million plus €3 million for transport costs. The estimated cost of TBM tunnelling was 15 per cent below those of drilling and blasting.

The two bores were in zoning section 9.1 of the rail line, which covered the route between Schliengen and Eimeldingen. The project was controlled and monitored from the project office of DB ProjektBau in Freiburg.

=== Construction ===
Upon completion of the plan approval process for this section in November 2002, work began with the building of an access road to the site of the north portal in December 2002. Contracts were let with the consortium in the summer of 2003. Pre-construction work began in August 2003, and the official construction work began on 1 September 2003. The first construction work was carried out in the south as a 320 m-long preliminary cutting and the establishment of the construction site at the southern portal.

With the establishment of site equipment and the development of necessary infrastructure, construction work began at the south portal in November 2003. The building site included an area of 100,000 m^{2} and included, among other things, offices, a camp with residential accommodation for up to 230 workers, storage and handling areas, a factory for tunnel-lining segments (11,000 m^{2}) and an information centre. Due to delays and the reprioritisation of transport projects, construction in 2004 lasted for just five months. In August 2004, it was decided to continue with the project. The supply and assembling of the two tunnel boring machines took approximately a year. These were disassembled after being built in the factory and transported to the construction site by 120 trucks.

==== Boring ====
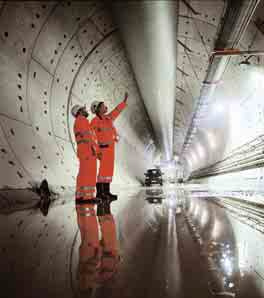
One of the two tunnels under construction

Out of a total length of 9,385 m, 8,984 m was built by tunnel-boring machine. The last 286 m of the northern section and the last 115 m in the southern sector was built using the cut and cover method. The tunnel patronesses (Tunnelpatinnen) were the local member of the Bundestag Marion Caspers-Merk (eastern bore) and Inken Oettinger, the wife of the then minister-president of Baden-Württemberg Günther Oettinger (western bore).

The excavation of the eastern bore began in June 2005 (according to another source in May 2005) and boring of the western tunnel began in October of the same year. The excavation ran every day around the clock and was only Interrupted for one or two weeks over Christmas and on the feast day of Saint Barbara, patron saint of tunnellers (4 December). The tunnellers worked in two shifts of ten hours and four hours during the night was set aside for the maintenance of equipment and for the drilling of pilot holes for exploring the ground ahead. The advance of the eastern tunnel between tunnel-kilometers 3.7 and 4.3 experienced unexpected delays after an inflow of from 20 to 30 litres of water per second were experienced at the rock face and a closed-face tunnelling method had to be adopted. The tunneling of the western bore avoided a delay by making a timely change in tunnelling method.

The progress of tunnel boring increased from about ten metres per day per bore (June 2005) to about 15 m per day (western tube) or 18 m per day (eastern tube) in 2006, to about 20 m per day (early 2007), with daily peaks of up to 34 m.

In March 2007, the ventilation shafts were connected to the tunnel lining. The breakthrough of the eastern tunnel was achieved on 20 September 2007 at about 16:35 and the breakthrough of the western tunnel followed on 1 October 2007 at 15:10. A total of around 1.80 million m^{3} of solid material and 2.45 million m^{3} of loose material (of which 125,000 m^{3} consisted of pre-cut material) was extracted.

According to the chairman of the tunneling company, Martin Herrenknecht the tunneling was completed eight months ahead of schedule.

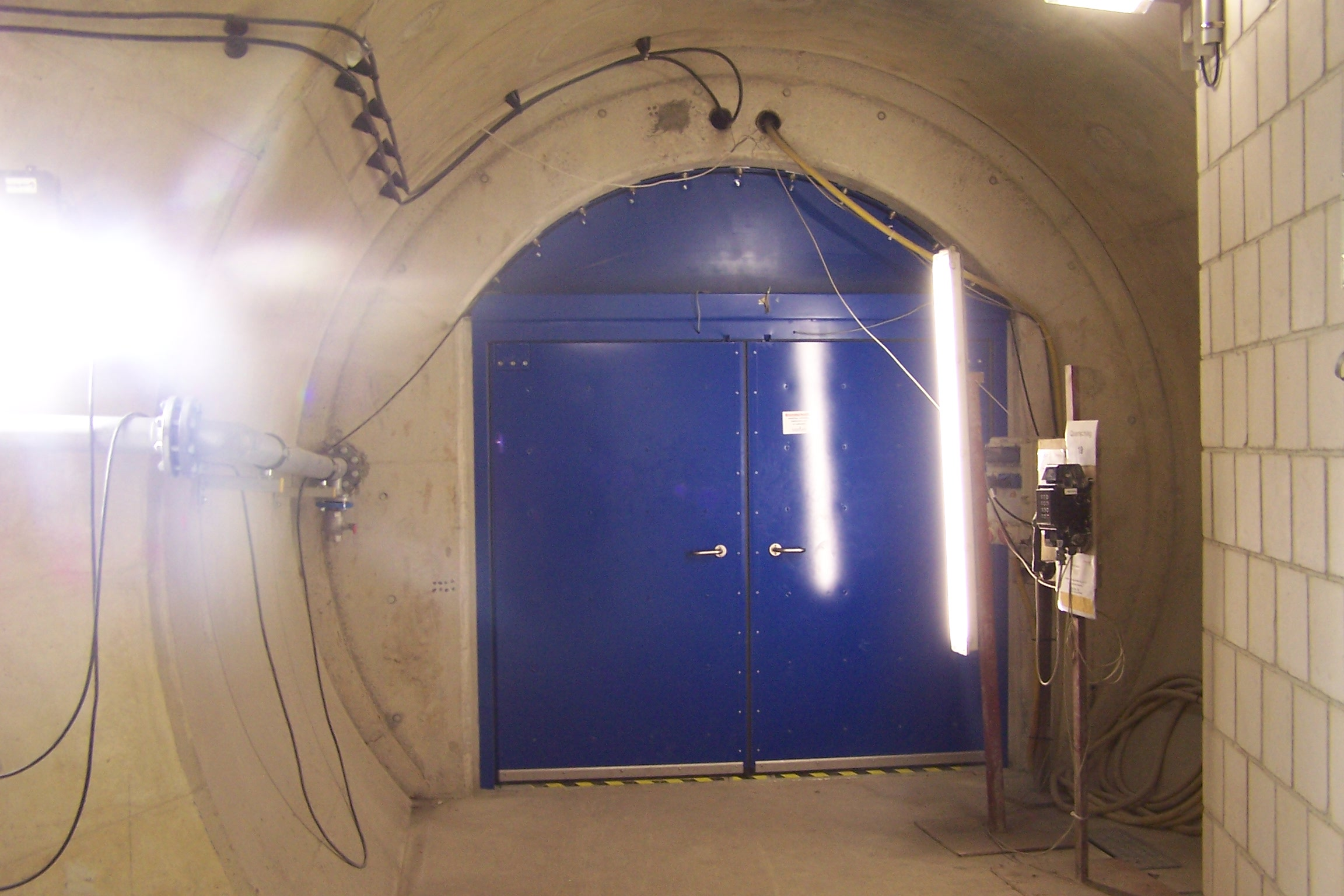
View of the door of a cross passage (July 2012)

The circular cross passages, each with an inner radius of 2.0 m, were built using the New Austrian Tunnelling method from the eastern to the western tunnel in each case. The material was then broken, depending on the ground conditions, with excavators, shovels, rotary hammers and milling. The cross passages were finished during the construction phase as escape routes. The cross passages were built by a dedicated construction team.

Where the tunnel passes under the residential area of the town of Bad Bellingen the ground is unstable with the upper layer of soil moving downhill. This was extensively monitored before and during the construction works by inclinometer and geodesic measurements. In 2000, movements of about 5 mm per year were observed, while during the tunneling shifts of up to 130 mm per year were measured, but the movements then went back to their original value. The rate of sinking was about 2 mm per year before the tunnelling, while the sinking increased to 35 mm. No damage incurred to the three affected houses.

During the construction phase up to 500 workers from 13 nations were simultaneously employed at the site. There were no fatal accidents.

The two tunnel boring machines were dismantled and removed in 2008.

==== Construction technology ====
The construction of the tunnel used a tunneling shield to drive through hard rock for the first time in Germany. Two identical, 2,500 ton and 220 m long tunnel boring machines (TBMs) tunnelled through 200 to 250 million years old strata at an average of 15 m per day. Here, from the outset, the total cross-section of each tunnel was excavated in one operation. The machines both possessed 3,200 kW drives, with a shield with a diameter of 11.16. m. To prevent the machine from losing the protection of the shield, all parts of the TBM were designed so that they could be substituted from behind. During the construction, the groundwater level was lowered in places.

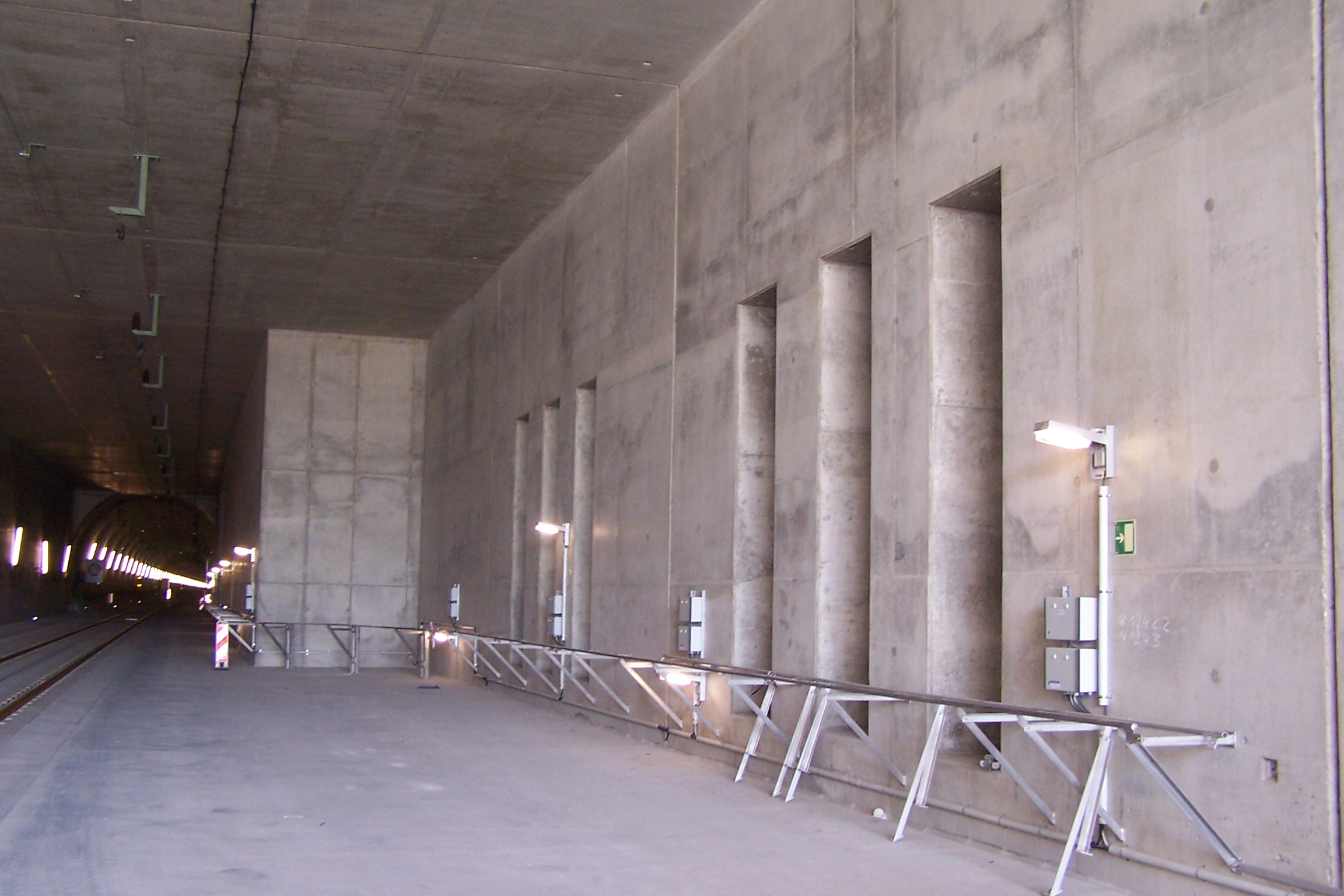
Portal hood with ventilation slots (right), in the background is the western bore, the entrance to which has been enlarged by mining methods

A usable section of 62 m^{2} (above the top of the rail) was created, with a full section of 95 m^{2}. The inner radius (excluding access space) is 4.70 m To avoid tunnel booms, the cross-section of the tunnels gradually narrows towards the tunnel centre. This is intended to prevent air pressure fluctuations from exceeding two-thirds of the level of conventional rail tunnels. In addition, portal hoods with ventilation slots were built for the first time in Europe. Because of these measures, which were adopted after the letting of the contract, the tunnel had to be put into operation later than originally planned.

From February 2005 onwards, a 2.5 km-long conveyor belt system was built to transport material to the Kapf quarry between 6 AM and 10 PM. A 60 t heavy loader was procured for the filling of the quarry, for €1.2 million.

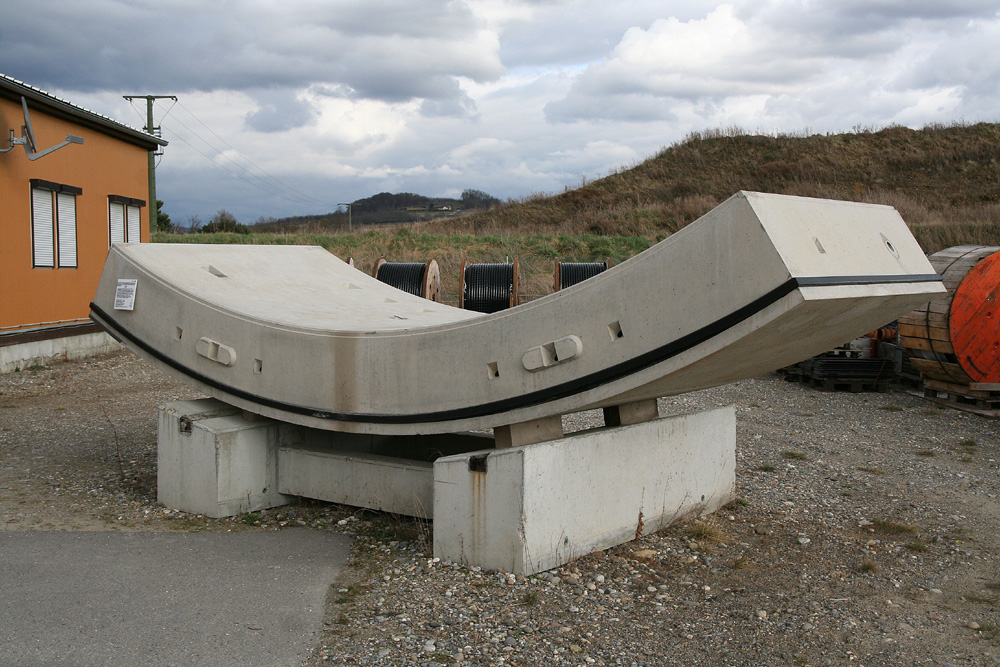
A concrete segment, as used in the Katzenberg Tunnel

The prefabricated inner shell consists of approximately 63,000 concrete segments. These are 60 cm-thick and 200 cm-wide and were assembled locally in 96 tons rings with an internal diameter of 9.4 m, and an external diameter of 10.6 m. A ring consists of six concrete segments and a keystone.

Road-rail vehicles especially designed for use in the Katzenberg Tunnel brought the assembled rings as required into the tunnel. The installation time for a full ring was between 40 and 50 minutes. The precast segments were temporarily connected to each other immediately after installation by prepared joints with slanted screws. A gap that was between 17 and 25 cm-wide between the outside of the tunnel and the segment ring was filled with mortar. Once the mortar had cured, the temporary joints were removed.

Up to 168 full rings could be prepared per week in a 24-hour operation in the segment production plant that had been erected at the south portal. For each element, up to 880 kg of rebar were intertwined in about eight minutes and then filled with concrete. With the concrete setting in ten hours, the process was carried out twice a day at the height of the construction. Then the segments were taken to a checking point by cranes equipped with vacuum lifters. If they passed quality control—the proportion of the segments that failed was 0.3%—the segments were placed in a curing warehouse, where they hardened for three days and were then checked again for cracks. Finally, a neoprene seal was glued on and the segments were transported to a central warehouse. After 14 days there, they reached “B45” quality (capacity to handle 45 N per mm² or 450 kg per cm^{2}) and after 56 days they reached “B65” quality.

In the area of cross passages, a special type of steel was used that could be removed for the excavation of the cross passages. For the power requirements of the construction site of up to 18 M, several 20 kV power lines were built to the site connecting to the nearby Hertingen substation, where an additional transformer was installed.

==== Other construction ====
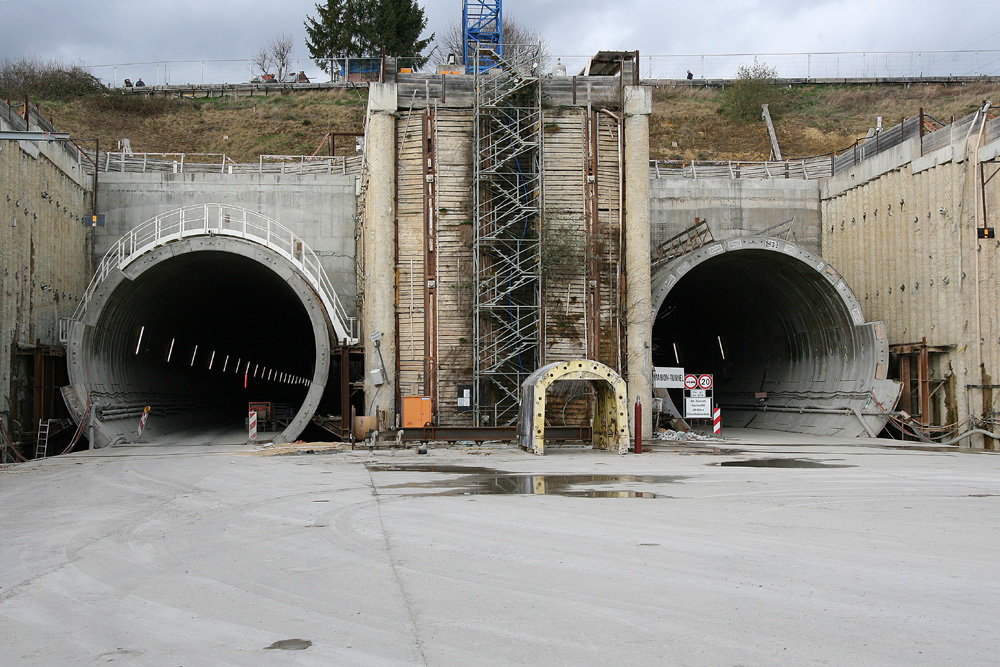
South portals of the completed tunnels, but the covered extension had not been built (March 2008)

In early March 2007, ground was broken for the connection from the tunnel to the existing line. Between March and May 2007, the main part of the northern approach cutting was secured with piles.

The shells of the tunnel was completed in December 2010. In March 2010, the contract to equip the tunnel with slab track was awarded to Max Bögl. It was installed between November 2010 and March 2012. Installation of the slab track was largely completed in the western tunnel in October 2011 and completed in the eastern tunnel in March 2012.

After preparation of the slab and track, the catenary, the control and safety systems and rescue technical equipment were installed. Finally the interior of the connecting structures were fitted with doors, emergency power supply, communication systems and fire-fighting equipment. In December 2009, Balfour Beatty Rail began with the survey work for the construction of the overhead line and the first holes were made in January 2010. This was followed by the building of a 680-metre-long supply line The electrification was completed in May 2012. The first test runs were then carried out.

Construction the track of the new section of line between the south portal of the tunnel and the provisional connection of the lines in Haltingen began in the second half of 2011.

=== Commissioning ===
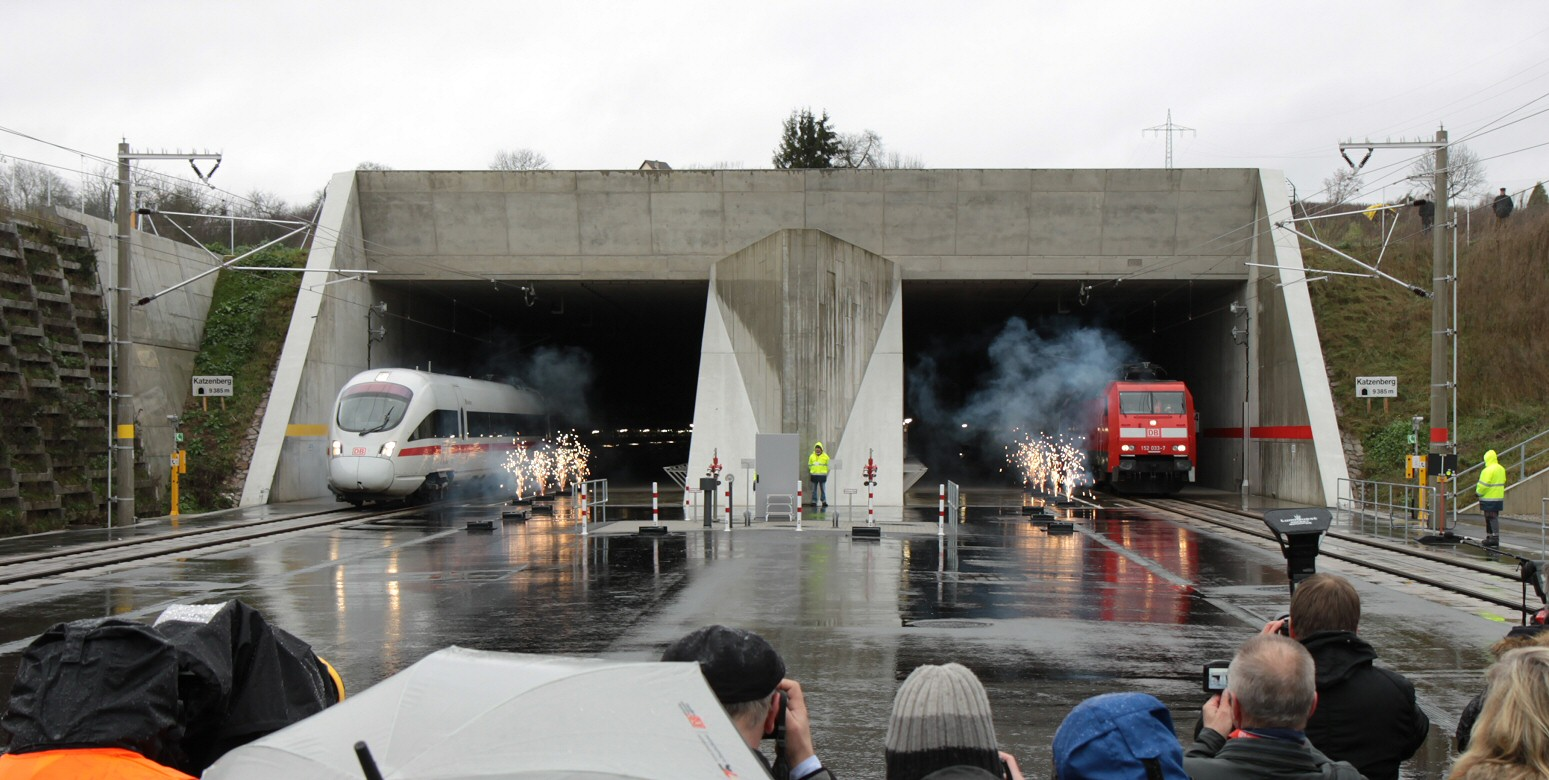
An ICE train and a freight train at the southern portal at the inauguration on 4 December 2012

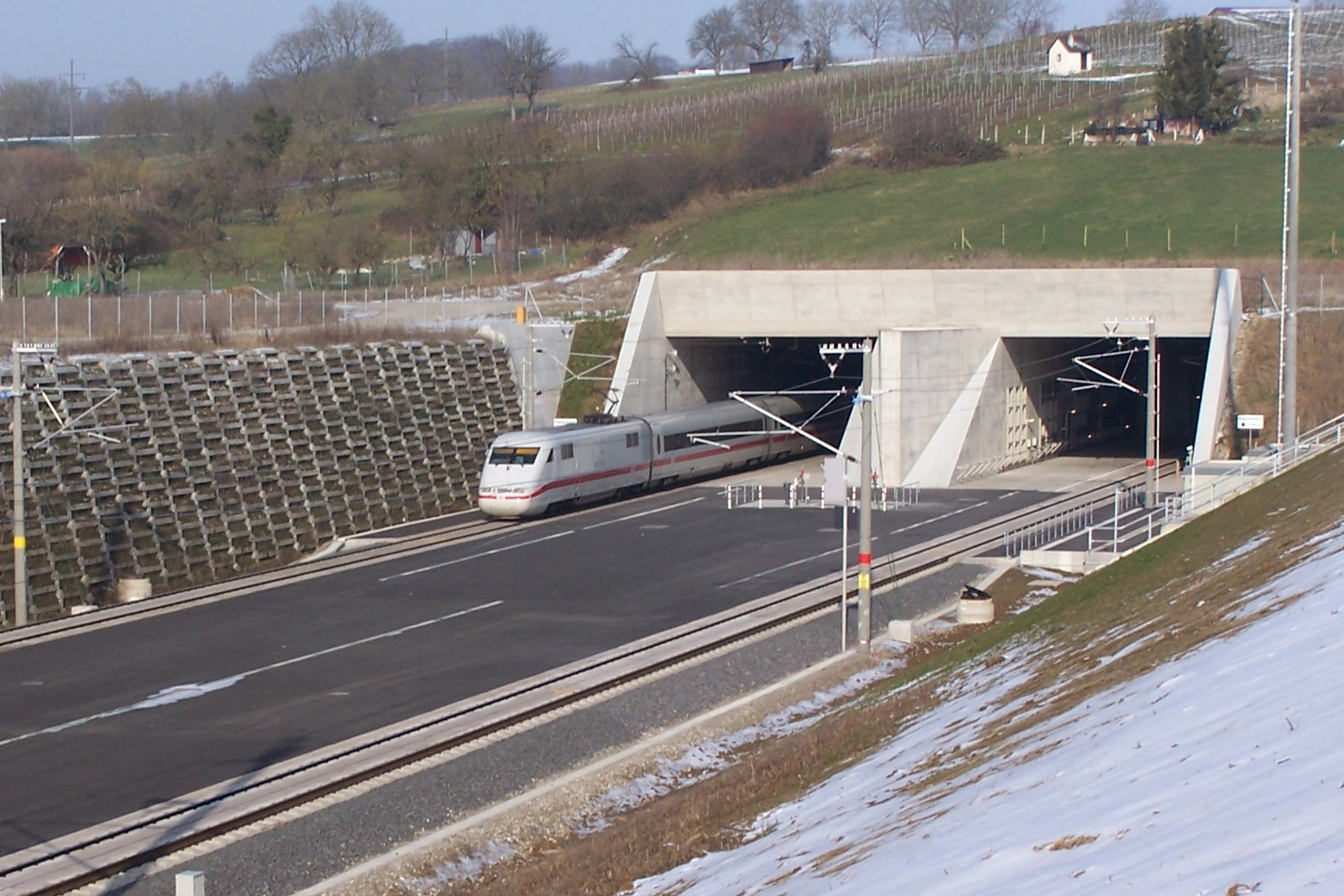
An ICE 1 train on the way to Basel leaves the south portal (January 2013).

The commissioning, which was originally planned to be held in time for the timetable change in December 2011, was delayed due to the need to install structures to reduce tunnel boom that were added after the letting of the contract and finally carried out at the timetable change on 9 December 2012.

On 28 July 2012, the first run through the tunnel was operated by a diesel railcar, a Regio-Shuttle, at 20 km/h to record videos. These videos were required for train drivers to obtain route knowledge. On 24 August 2012, the power on the catenary was turned on. At 8:00 AM on 7 September, a Stadler FLIRT multiple unit operated by SBB GmbH (Swiss Federal Railways Germany) departed as the first electric train to pass through the tunnel at 155 km/h, also making video recordings. Between 17 September and 5 October high-speed tests with a top speed of 275 km/h were carried out by the ICE S set. The drivers were trained in advance with the help of video recordings.

On 17 November 2012, a rescue exercise took place with a total of 350 emergency services staff. The "passengers" were evacuated via a cross passage to the parallel tunnel and taken from there by buses and trucks to the south portal. After 75 minutes, all persons were evacuated from the tunnel.

The opening of the tunnel on 4 December 2012 was attended by, among others, the Federal Minister of Transport Peter Ramsauer, Deutsche Bahn CEO Rüdiger Grube and the state minister of transport Winfried Hermann. The first official operations through the tunnel took place shortly after 2:30 PM from the north to the south portal with parallel trips of ICE T multiple unit set 1502 ("Karlsruhe") and a freight train hauled by a Siemens EuroSprinter locomotive.

=== Prospects ===
The Filder Tunnel (part of Stuttgart 21) is due to replace the Katzenberg Tunnel as the longest double-tube railway tunnel in Germany in 2021.

There are forecast to be 60 freight trains per day on the section in 2025.

== Operations ==
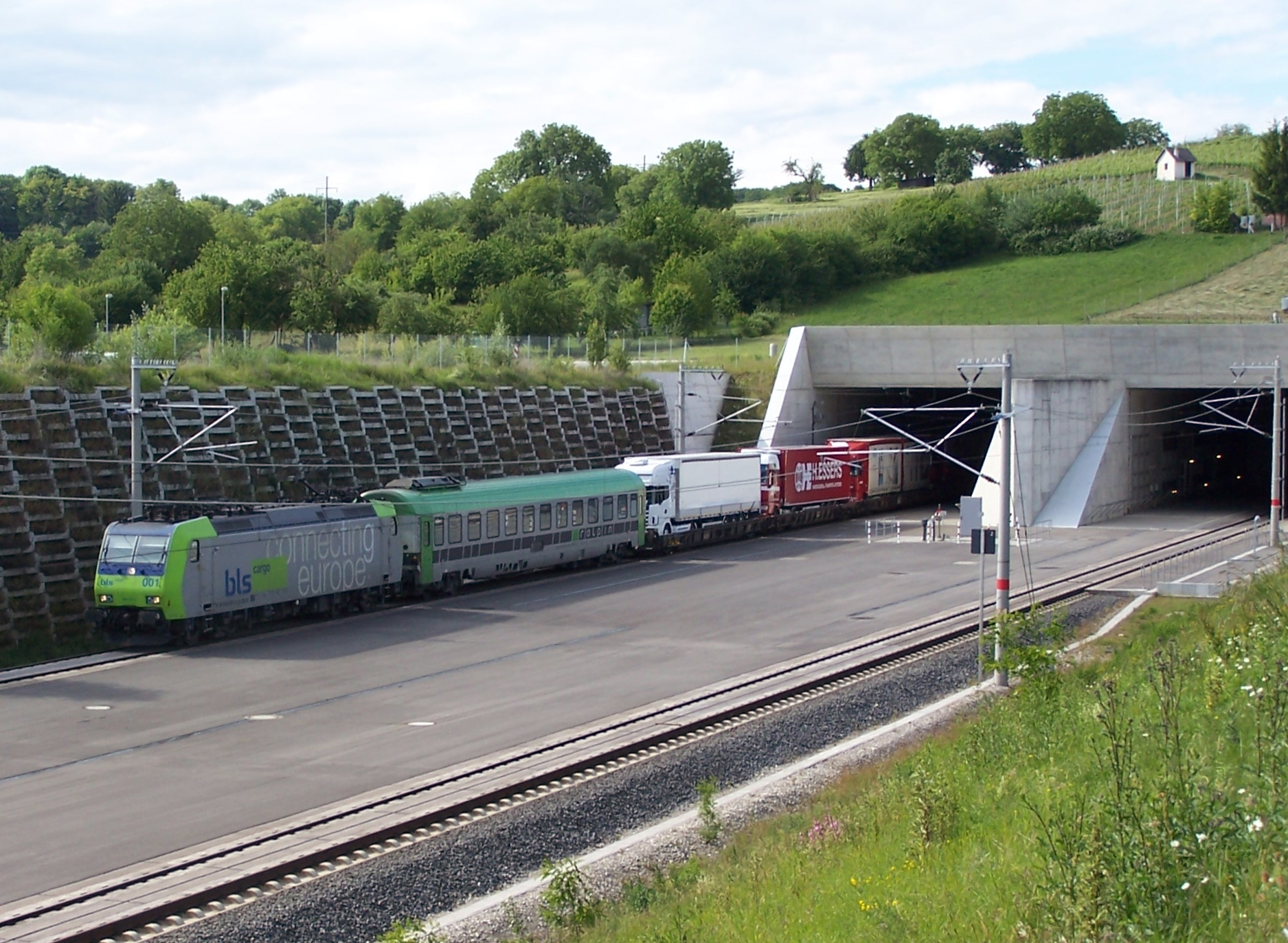
Rolling highway freight train at the southern portal, during the closure of the old Rhine Valley Railway (May 2014)

The High-speed rail services and much of the freight traffic travelling on this section of the Rhine Valley line run through the tunnel. At night, all freight trains pass through the tunnel and only seven rolling highway trains, which cannot pass through the tunnel for technical reasons, remain on the old long and curvy line. In the spring of 2013, more freight trains were observed using the original route again. From 22 April to 28 September 2014, DB Netz closed the original section of track for renovations of the track and embankments and the construction of noise barriers. Trains were rerouted during this time through the Katzenberg Tunnel, including rolling highway traffic.

The scheduled journey time between Freiburg and Basel was reduced at the timetable change on 9 December 2012 from 35 to 33 minutes. In this case, the length of the line in the Isteiner Klotz area was reduced by 3.814 km. At the same time the speed limit was increased to 250 km/h (in the tunnel and south of it to the Haltingen curve). In the Haltingen curve, the speed limit of 110 km/h will be raised to 160 km/h with the completion of the next section of the upgrade. The section has four tracks rather than the two tracks available through the tunnels. Together with other construction projects, the travel time from Basel to Karlsruhe will be reduced from the current 100 to 69 minutes.

The new link is connected by sets of points that allow trains to run at 100 km/h through the junction as the curve at the junction has a radius of 1200 m. During regular operations, ICE trains on the new section therefore cannot reach the authorised maximum speed of 250 km/h. A permanent grade-separated connection to the original line is planned. According to Deutsche Bahn, all freight will be able to pass through the tunnel in 2025. Flying junctions have been omitted according to Deutsche Bahn in favour of shorter automatic signalling blocks. The federal and state governments and Deutsche Bahn have agreed to an optimisation of the interconnection points (in particular via grade-separated connections) to avoid forecast traffic congestion in 2025. At the northern and southern junctions, the connections to the Rhine Valley Railway can be passed at 160 km/h.

Under Deutsche Bahn’s infrastructure charging system, the new line through the tunnel is classified as category F1. The basic price for trips through the tunnel amounts to €4.60 per train kilometre. DB Netz announced in November 2012 that it would adjust the route prices from the end of 2014 so that freight trains would have no incentive to use the old line. With the introduction of a new track pricing system, these incentives would be discontinued from December 2016. The shorter route through the tunnel compared to old line through would then be cheaper.

According to Deutsche Bahn, after the commissioning of Katzenberg Tunnel, the number of trains on the existing route were reduced: between 6 AM and 10 PM, the average number of trains was reduced from 231 (in 2012) to 81 (in 2013), during the night hours they were reduced from 63 to 19. The average number of freight trains in the same period was reduced from 112 to 18 between 6 AM and 10 PM and during the night from 42 to 6.

== Costs and funding ==
The structural cost of the tunnel was specified in April 2006 as costing €250 million, in mid-2010 as €330 million, in mid-2011 it was given as €250 million again and at the end of 2012 it was €340 million. The projected total cost of the construction phase, which included, apart from the tunnel, the connecting tracks, was estimated in 2007 to cost approximately €0.5 billion. According to Martin Herrenknecht the budget had been exceeded by ten percent. In July 2012, the cost of the tunnel and its integration with the existing network was estimated to cost €520 million.

A total of €610 million was invested in the entire project. Of this, €340 million was spent on the tunnel shell, €90 million on the adjoining sections and €90 million on the fit-out. The planning costs amounted to €90 million. It was financed by the federal government, the European Union and Deutsche Bahn.

The reasons given for exceeding the estimated construction costs by about €80 million was the need to test new designs, the adoption of new design standards, unexplored geology, unexpected water ingress and the adoption of additional measures to reduce tunnel boom.
