= Kurpark Bad Bellingen =

Nature park and botanical garden in Germany

Coordinates: 47.7305°N 7.5538°E

The Kurpark Bad Bellingen (24.3 hectares) is a nature park and botanical garden located on the Badstraße, Bad Bellingen, Baden-Württemberg, Germany. Its natural area covers 11.3 hectares; the park and garden covers 10.8 hectares, and includes green spaces as well as yearly plantings of tens of thousands of spring and summer flowers.

== See also ==
- List of botanical gardens in Germany
