= Karlsruhe–Basel high-speed railway =

German high-speed railway

Overview
- Native name: Ausbau- und Neubaustrecke Karlsruhe–Basel
- Line number: 4280 (high-speed line); 4000 (original line)
- Locale: Baden-Württemberg, Germany
- Termini: Karlsruhe Hbf; Basel Bad Bf

Service
- Route number: 702

Technical
- Line length: 182 km (113 mi)
- Number of tracks: 2 continuous
- Track gauge: 1,435 mm (4 ft 8 1/2 in) standard gauge
- Electrification: 15 kV/16.7 Hz AC overhead catenary
- Operating speed: 250 km/h (155 mph)

The Karlsruhe–Basel high-speed railway (Ausbau- und Neubaustrecke Karlsruhe–Basel, literally "Upgraded and new line Karlsruhe–Basel") is a new line being built on the route of the Mannheim–Karlsruhe–Basel railway (Rhine Valley Railway). As a result of the project, the railway through the Rhine Valley is being upgraded to four continuous tracks and its operational efficiency will be increased as a result of the segregation of the various transport flows. The travel time for passenger services between Karlsruhe and Basel is to be shortened by 31 minutes. The project forms part of the Rotterdam–Genoa corridor and part of it is also part of the Main line for Europe (Magistrale für Europa in German and Magistrale européenne in French; Paris–Budapest).

Large parts of the line runs next to the existing Rhine Valley Railway. The planning of the line has been carried out progressively since the mid-1980s and the first section of the line between Rastatt Süd and Offenburg, was placed in operation in 1993. While several sections have been opened others are under construction or not started. The main components of the projects include the Rastatt Tunnel, the Katzenberg Tunnel and a western bypass of Freiburg for freight.

The date of the completion of the overall project is uncertain. The Federal Government considers a completion by 2030 possible. Planning services for sections 7.2. to 7.4 have been procured on the basis that it will be completed by the end of 2042.

The planned total cost is €6.172 billion (as of April 2013). Until the end of 2014, €2.27 billion had been spent on it. Deutsche Bahn estimated the total cost in 2015 as being €7.1 billion.

== Route ==
Between Karlsruhe and Offenburg, the route runs closely parallel with the existing Rhine Valley Railway. Between Offenburg and Buggingen (south of Freiburg), it will run next to the A 5 as a new bypass of Freiburg. This section, which is designed to be operated at 160 km/h (99 mph), is to be used in future by freight trains. A dense population and a reduction in the impact of freight transport were the key reasons for choosing this option. The existing line in this area, running from Offenburg through Freiburg to Buggingen, is to be upgraded for a running speeds of 200 to 250 km/h (120 to 160 mph) and will be used by all or almost all passenger trains.

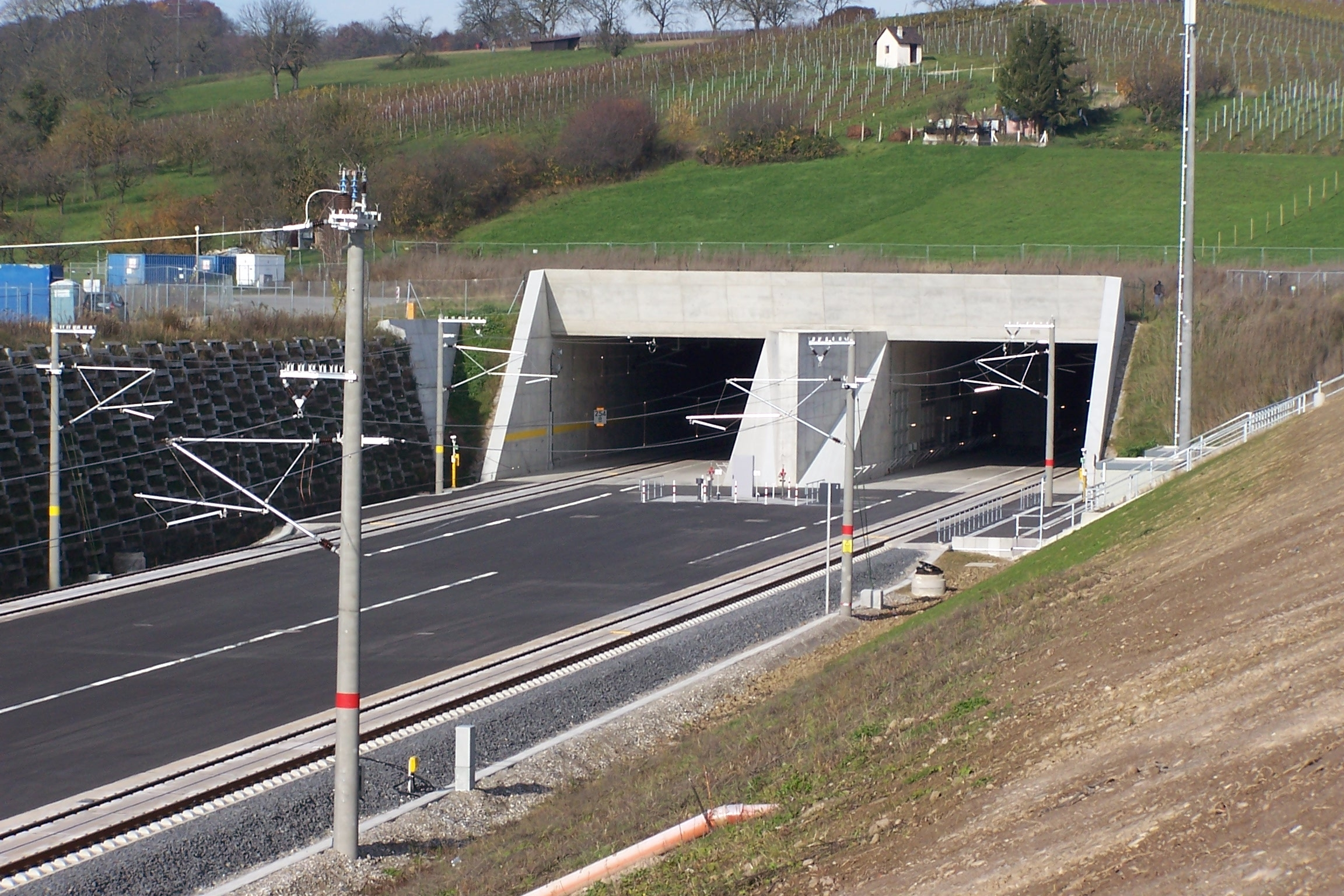
Southern portal of the Katzenberg Tunnel

In Buggingen, south of Freiburg, the freight bypass and the Rhine Valley Railway will meet up again and run in parallel to Schliengen. Between Schliengen and Eimeldingen the new line runs through the Katzenberg Tunnel, which with a length of 9.4 kilometres is the largest single structure in this section. The tunnel shortens the route for passenger trains, avoiding the winding route along a bank in this area. Later the passenger and freight tracks will run parallel to the Basel rail node.

The line between Rastatt Süd and Offenburg can be operated at 250 km/h (160 mph). The newly built sections between Buggingen and Basel can also be traversed at this speed. The planned freight bypass of Freiburg is designed for 160 km/h (99 mph). According to the federal government, although the speeds could have been increased to 300 km/h (190 mph) on some disconnected sections, this would not have had significant travel time benefits. The projected speed of 250 km/h (160 mph), as opposed to the 300 km/h (190 mph) achieved on recent new lines, results from planning carried out in the 1980s. Between Rastatt station and Rastatt-Niederbühl the line continues to be double-track. This is to be resolved by the construction of the Rastatt Tunnel. The remaining section between Offenburg and Freiburg and further south is still being planned.

The 7 km-long Offenburg Tunnel is to be built under the city of Offenburg, which has 60,000 inhabitants. The German parliament approved the construction and financing of the tunnel on 28 January 2016.

== History ==
=== Background ===
In the 20th century, there were demands for a new railway line to stimulate the central and southern Upper Rhine economically and to allow additional traffic to run.

A study in 1964 for the executive board of Deutsche Bundesbahn proposed the straightening of the line—particularly in Rastatt and Offenburg—to achieve significant travel time savings.

A program of upgrades for the Deutsche Bundesbahn network (Ausbauprogramm für das Netz der Deutschen Bundesbahn) that was submitted in 1970 provided for the construction of some 50 kilometre of new line by 1985 to relieve the most heavily used section between Rastatt and Offenburg. The route would branch off the existing Karlsruhe–Ettlingen West–Rastatt line near Muggensturm and bypass Rastatt to the east and Achern to the west. The new line would rejoin the existing line north of Offenburg. The town of Rastatt would have been connected to the new line by a shuttle service. The new section between the Rastatt area and Offenburg was allocated the second highest level of priority of the plan and was therefore targeted to be completed by 1985. The construction of the sections between Mannheim and Karlsruhe and between Offenburg and Basel would have been completed after 1985.

While planning in the first half of the 1970s still provided for an almost direct new line between Karlsruhe and Basel with a large loading gauge (for the transport of trucks in enclosed high-speed wagons), it was updated in the second half of the 1970s. In mid-July 1979, Deutsche Bundesbahn plans announced that the route would no longer consist of a completely new line. Instead, the new line would to a large extent be placed next to the existing line.

In 1990, around 320 trains ran on the existing line on each weekday (total of both directions). In 1992, the existing line between Offenburg and Basel carried approximately 130 trains per day in each direction. The line was considered overloaded, particularly towards Basel, which was calculated as having a capacity of around 110 trains per day. The Federal Transport Infrastructure Plan (Bundesverkehrswegeplan) 1992 forecast an increase in the number of trains south of Offenburg from 133 trains (as of 1992) to 190 trains per day and direction.

=== Planning ===
As a result of intermodal economic and business analysis carried out by the Federal Ministry of Transport, the “(Karlsruhe–) Rastatt–Offenburg–Basel railway” was added the Federal Transport Infrastructure Plan 1980 (BVWP 1980). As part of the Stufe I (“level I”) of the BVWP 1980, the first work would have been a new double-track line between Rastatt and Offenburg to be built by 1990 for DM 960 million. In addition, the plan provided for an upgrade to three-tracks between Offenburg and Basel with improvements to the track. A total of DM 2.5 billion (1978 prices) would have been invested in the project. The Federal Transport Infrastructure Plan 1980 also provided for an additional track between Offenburg and Basel in the period after 1990 as part of Stufe II (“level II”). At the end of 1980, the planners envisaged initiating the first planning approval procedure in 1981. A planning group for the upgraded and new line was established in Karlsruhe in 1981. The regional planning approval procedure for the Karlsruhe–Basel section was carried out during 1983 and 1984.

In the mid-1980s, the section between Offenburg and Rastatt was particularly congested. Around 290 trains ran daily through this bottleneck and more on peak days. The then Deutsche Bundesbahn described traffic on the section as exceeding capacity by 30 percent. Traffic was expected to increase to 350 trains per day by the end of the century. It was intended at that time that a 70 km-long new railway line would be built between Durmersheim and Offenburg parallel to the existing line designed for operations at 250 km/h, an upgraded line would be built between Offenburg and Schliengen for operations at 200 km/h (this would have included measures for maximising capacity), an approximately 20 kilometer-long new line would be built between Schliengen and Basel and a planning study would be undertaken for a third track south of Offenburg. The project would have cost 2.3 billion DM and have been completed in 1995. The cost–benefit analysis for the Federal Transport Infrastructure Plan showed a benefit-cost ratio of 5.4 for the overall Karlsruhe–Basel project.

Preparations for the land use and planning approval process began in 1984. The first regional planning process, for the Karlsruhe–Offenburg section, was successfully concluded in the autumn of 1984. Detailed planning commenced immediately and an initial planning approval process for the Achern area was opened in 1985. It was intended that the upgrade project, under which almost 80 percent of the route would have been made operable at 200 km/h, would be finalised if possible by 1994.

In February 1988, the regional planning approval process was commenced for the Schliengen–Basel section.

The Federal Transport Infrastructure Plan 1985 provided for four tracks between Karlsruhe and Offenburg. In the section continuing to Basel the capacity of the two existing tracks would be upgraded and an option for a third track would be considered. Between Offenburg and Schliengen, the line could be upgraded for 200 km/h with relatively little work. The section with projects listed as "urgent requirements" in the BVWP 1985 included the so-called 1. Stufe der ABS/NBS Karlsruhe – Offenburg – Basel ("level 1 of the Karlsruhe–Offenburg–Basel upgraded and new line") with an investment cost of DM 1,678 million. The section covering planning provided DM 532 million for a second stage.

Due to the proposed new and upgraded rail links through the Alps (between Switzerland and Italy and between Austria and Italy), planning for the Karlsruhe–Basel section was checked for adequate capacity around 1989. Although the upgrading of the existing line to enable operations over two tracks at 250 km/h (160 mph) was not listed in the Federal Transport Infrastructure Plan 1985, this specification had already been adopted in the planning. Deutsche Bundesbahn took over the planning in 1989. It developed three groups of options that could be combined for the section between Freiburg and Basel: along the Rhine Valley Railway, along the autobahn and bypass routes. The 1990 planning studies produced forecasts of costs, depending on the option, of around DM four billion, plus or minus 15 percent. Considerations of passenger traffic bypassing Freiburg with a route that was about 7.5 kilometers shorter and would serve the city with a station at the intersection with the Freiburg–Colmar railway at Hochdorf have since been discarded. This bypass of Freiburg would instead serve only freight trains and special trains bypassing Freiburg.

In the second half of 1993, a continuous four-track upgrade of the Rhine Valley Railway was an element of the draft Federal Transport Infrastructure Plan 1992. In addition to Switzerland's decision to implement NRLA, the building of the Betuweroute in the Netherlands, Austria's introduction of a ban on driving trucks at night on 1 December 1989 and the introduction of the European Union’s internal market on 1 January 1993, the wish to improve rail passenger services was a major reason for its adoption. Construction of a third track on the section was discarded due to insufficient capacity and operational difficulties.

In mid 1986, DB calculated that if construction began in the following year, the project could be completed in 1994. A new line would be built between Rastatt and Offenburg and on the remaining section to Basel the maximum speed would be raised to at least 200 km/h (with occasional line improvements).

The board of Deutsche Bundesbahn authorised the upgrade in December 1986. On 1 January 1987, it approved the construction of the Karlsruhe–Offenburg section. On 21 January 1987, the Federal Transport Minister Werner Dollinger, in agreement with the Minister of Finance, responded to a request of the then Deutsche Bundesbahn and approved funding to build the line as part of the Federal Transport Infrastructure Plan 1985 under section 14.3c of the Bundesbahn Act (Bundesbahngesetz). The costs were then estimated at DM 2.3 billion; the construction would commence in 1987, although the planning approval process had not yet started. When completed, the travel time between Hamburg and Basel would be reduced by two hours to five and a half hours. The maximum speed between Karlsruhe and Offenburg would be 250 km/h. The existing Rhine Valley Railway would be upgraded between Karlsruhe and Offenburg for continuous operations as 160 km/h.

In December 1987, the first planning approval (for section 4) was finalised. In the same month the first pile was driven for a new bridge over the Acher. Three sections were considered for planning approval in early 1990.

In 1988, it was planned to leave the section between Offenburg and Basel as double track, but to upgrade it for maximum efficiency and a top speed of 200 km/h. A long-term option would be kept open to upgrade it for three-tracks. In 1990, Deutsche Bundesbahn was already examining a continuous four-track upgrade. When the Swiss parliament took the decision in 1991 to adopt the NRLA project, it also assumed that the line south of Offenburg would be rebuilt with four continuous tracks.

On 6 September 1996, an agreement was signed in Lugano between the head of the Federal Department of Transport and Energy of Switzerland and the Minister of Transport of the Federal Republic of Germany to secure the performance of the approach line to the new railway through the Swiss Alps. The progress of work in Germany and Switzerland is regularly reported to a German-Swiss steering committee.

No federal funds for the upgrading of the track were provided between 1998 and 2003. At first, the land-use and planning approval process continued. In the autumn of 1999, it was announced that, because of budgetary constraints, the quadruplication between Offenburg and Basel would not be implemented for the time being. All measures not yet begun were postponed and a new needs assessment and evaluation would be carried out. According to the previous assessment an upgrade of the existing line, including equipping it with CIR-ELKE (a now-superseded form of computerised operations and control of railways developed by Deutsche Bundesbahn in the 1990s) would only become necessary with the full utilisation of the new Alpine crossing. The section of line north of Offenburg would not be affected by the austerity measures. At the end of June 2000, DB Netz was studying the needs of for Offenburg-Niederschopfheim, Schliengen-Eilmeldingen and Haltingen Weil am Rhein sections.

DB and SBB announced at the end of 2002 they would re-examine the Bypass Hochrhein ("High Rhine bypass") feasibility study carried out at the end of 1993 to identify opportunities for capacity expansion in the Basel area. With the introduction of the planning approval procedure for section 7.3 on 3 July 2007, construction approval was sought for all sections between Offenburg and Weil am Rhein. On 4 March 2013, the project advisory board unanimously selected the so-called Bürgertrasse ("citizens’ route") through the Markgräflerland as well as the implementation of additional measures to control noise on the freight train bypass of Freiburg.

Between Karlsruhe and Basel, the estimated travel time reduction for passenger services would be 31 minutes. The scheduled travel time would be 69 minutes. Regional services along the line would also be improved.

In 2009, a project advisory board was established with representatives of the federal and the state department of transport, district administrators, local politicians and citizens' groups.

After five years of discussion, the Projektbeirat Rheintalbahn (“Rhine Valley Railway Project Advisory Group”) held its tenth and final meeting on 26 June 2015. Changes to the existing plan amounted to €2 billion in excess of the legal requirements for noise abatement. It agreed to the construction of the Offenburg Tunnel, a double-track freight line between Offenburg and Riegel, additional noise protection between Hügelsheim and Auggen and an at-grade design for the rail junction at Hügelsheim.

=== Construction ===
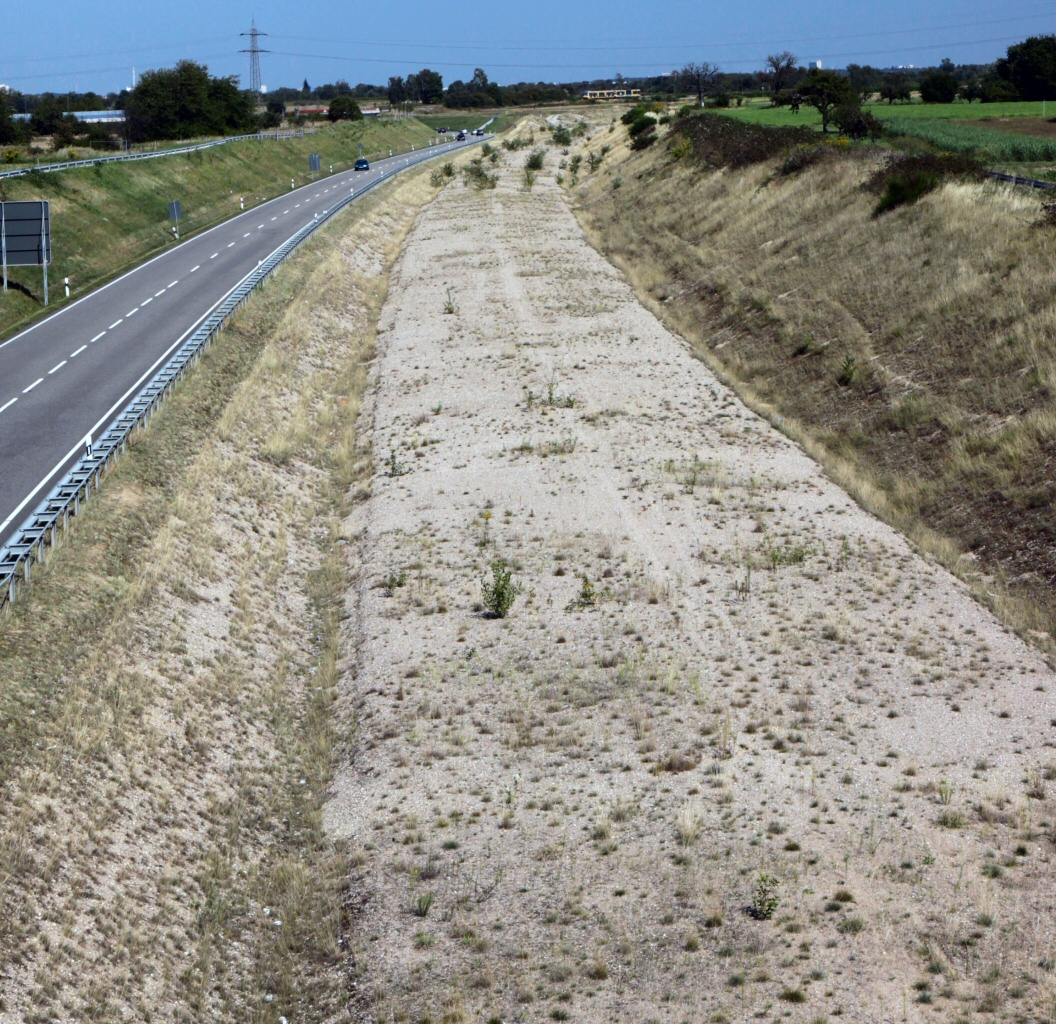
Already finished subgrade of the approach line in the Durmersheim area

On 12 December 1987, work began on the construction of two additional tracks on the Rastatt–Offenburg section in Achern station in the presence of the then Chancellery Minister Wolfgang Schäuble. Work began in the Bühl/Ottersweier area in December 1988.

Earthworks, including the track base, were completed at the end of 2006 over a length of over 7.5 kilometres for the new line between Karlsruhe and Rastatt, which was built together with the parallel construction of a new section of federal highway 36. It branches from the old Rhine Railway at the Bashaide block post near Durmersheim and runs to the approximate beginning of a future trough structure on the approach to the Rastatt Tunnel south of Ötigheim. The road and railway tracks are built below natural ground level.

=== Commissioning ===
The first nine-kilometre section between Bühl and Achern was taken into operation in March 1993. The southbound track was opened to scheduled traffic on 7 March and the northern track was opened on 28 March. Following the transfer of the traffic from the old tracks—with an unchanged speed of 160 km/h—the original route was rebuilt with new tracks.

The section between Buhl and Offenburg was taken into operation in June 2001. In mid-2003, the entire project was expected to be completed in 2012.

After nine years of construction and the investment of approximately €260 million, the 20 km-long section between Rastatt Süd and Buhl went into operation at the timetable change on 12 December 2004. Four new stations (Baden-Baden Haueneberstein, Baden-Baden Rebland, Sinzheim and Sinzheim Nord) were opened on the new section and a new Karlsruhe Stadtbahn service (S4) was established between Baden-Baden and Achern. Thus, a total of 43 km of the new line had been completed. The total investment at that time amounted to €1.2 billion.

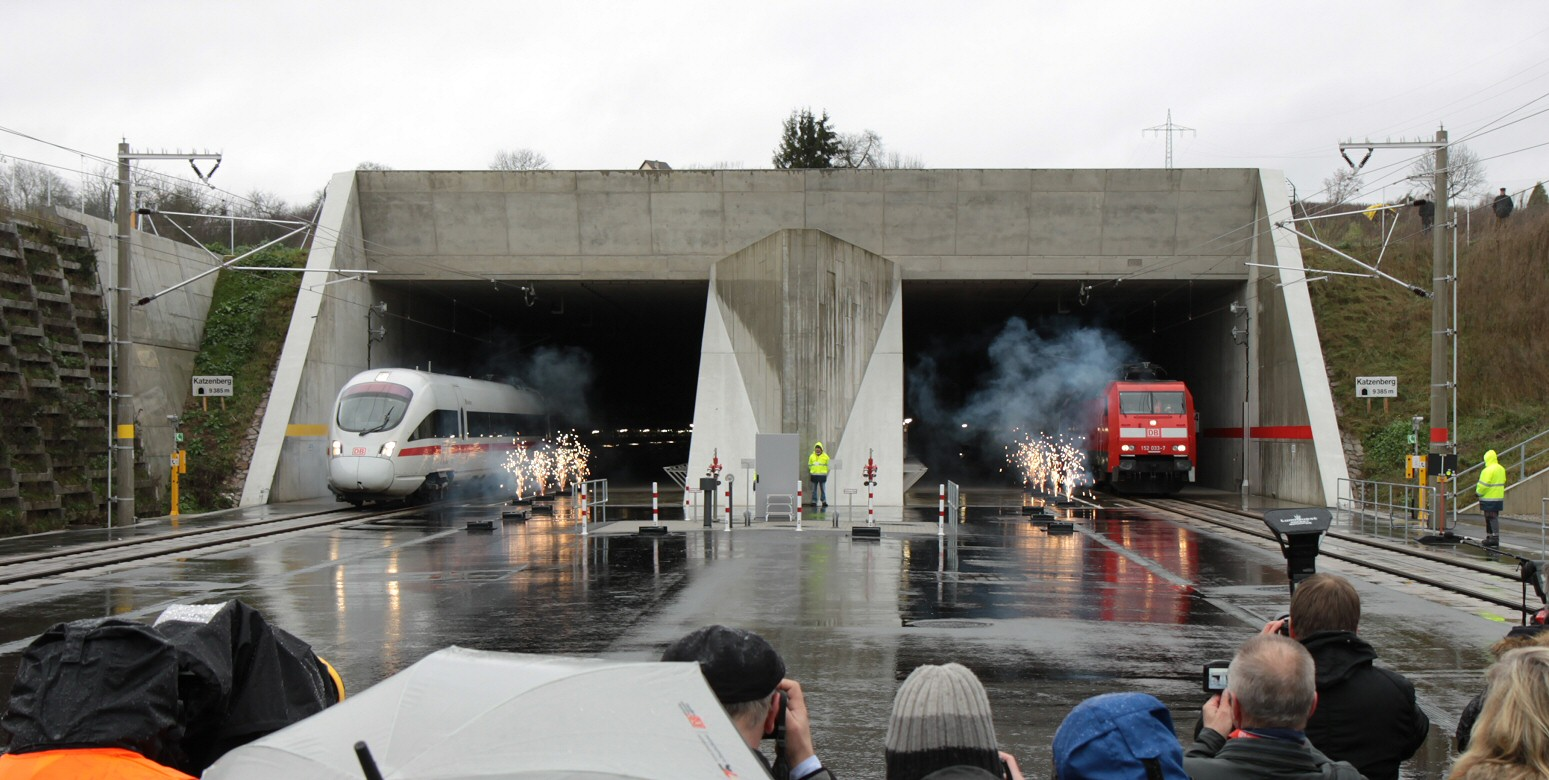
Inaugural run through the Katzenberg Tunnel with an ICE and a freight train (4 December 2012)

The Katzenberg Tunnel was put into operation in December 2012.

In July 2015, the responsibility for the project was transferred from DB ProjektBau to DB Netz.

=== Outlook ===
At least the southerly Katzenberg Tunnel section adjoining Basel has been put into operation in time for the opening of the Gotthard Base Tunnel in 2016. According to the federal government, the piece-by-piece upgrade of the Rhine Valley Railway will provide sufficient capacity for the growth of traffic on the line when it is needed. According to the Federal Ministry of Transport, progress favours the completion by 2022 of the upgrade to four tracks with the exception of the 40-kilometre section between Offenburg and Riegel/Kenzingen. That would mean that four-fifths of the project had been realised.

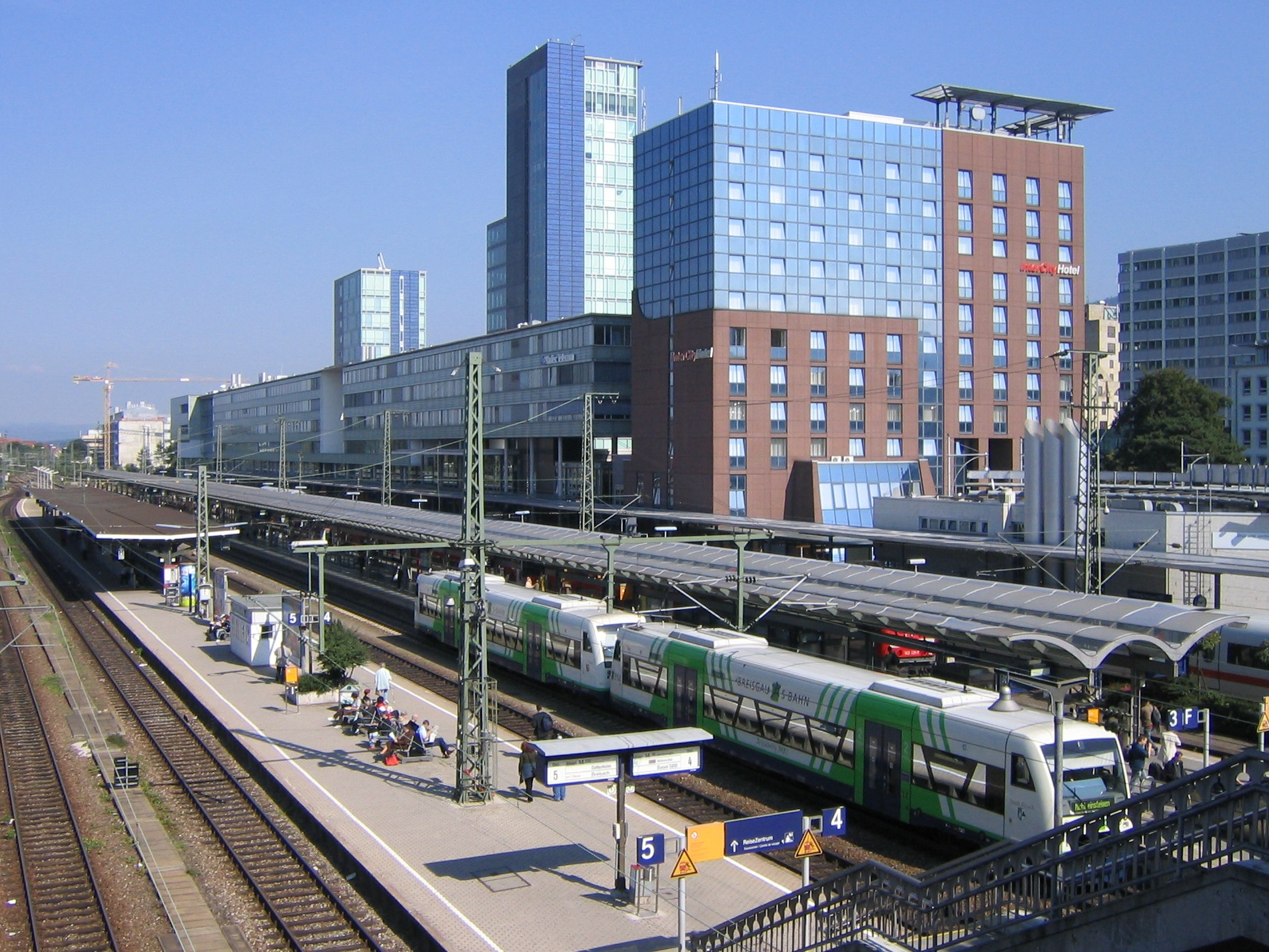
Freiburg Hauptbahnhof

A forecast for the Federal Transport Infrastructure Plan indicates that 38 pairs of trains in long-distance traffic will run on the Offenburg–Basel section each day. In freight transport, 137 daily trains are expected to run from north to south and 147 trains from south to north. In the section between Buggingen and Basel, 138 trains are expected to run from north to south and 148 trains from south to north. The German government expects the most heavily congested section of the Rhine Valley Railway to carry 335 trains per day in 2025. A forecast for 2030 should be included when the Federal Transport Infrastructure Plan 2015 is presented.

In December 2013, Deutsche Bahn announced its intention to call for tenders for a number of construction projects in the planning approval sections 9.0 to 9.3 for a total of around €200 million.

The Federal Government considers the substantial completion of the project by 2030 is possible if two core requirements, the Offenburg Tunnel and the section next to Autobahn 5 around Freiburg, are omitted.

==== Karlsruhe–Rastatt section ====
According to the planning status of 2007, section 1 between Karlsruhe and Rastatt should have been completed by 2011. The federal government proposed in 2007 to significantly increase the annual investment assuming the receipt of planning approvals. No funding for individual sections of the project had been allocated as of October 2010. The estimated total project cost in April 2010 was €5.734 billion.

Due to financial constraints, construction in the Rastatt area was not yet in sight in 2010. Work focused due to limited budgetary resources on the section in southern Baden. At the beginning of 2009, it was decided to revise the decade-old planning for the Rastatt Tunnel and to begin construction in early 2011. This was intended to be funded from the economic stimulus package II. Because of the high financial requirements and the long duration of the project, it was later separated from the stimulus package.

On 24 August 2012, Federal Ministry of Transport, Construction and Urban Development and Deutsche Bahn completed a financial agreement providing €693 million for the most northerly section of the project. It covered the 16 km-long northern section of the line, including the 4.27 km-long Rastatt Tunnel.

==== Offenburg–Katzenberg Tunnel section ====
A new line carrying mostly freight will be built from Offenburg to Buggingen, which is located in the middle between Freiburg and Basel. It will start a bit north of Offenburg and use a tunnel to underpass Offenburg. It will run on a separate route west of the current line. The existing line between Offenburg and Buggingen will be enhanced for speeds of 250 or 200 km/h on the existing tracks. Some sections will be expanded to quadruple track. Between Buggingen and the Katzenberg Tunnel the line will be expanded to quadruple track, with two tracks being capable of 250 km/h. The same applies between the Katzenberg Tunnel and Basel. Due to reordering of different trains some shorter sections will have six tracks. South of Offenburg station there is a sharp curve with a radius of 300 to 400 metres with a speed limited to 80 km/h. Deutsche Bahn had investigated the possibility of building the now planned freight train tunnel in Offenburg. First, a route had to be determined and then exploratory drillings were made. Also a route running parallel with the Autobahn between Offenburg and Riegel was examined. The costs of both studies, totalling €1.3 million, were shared equally between the DB and the state of Baden-Württemberg. The additional costs have now been determined, depending on the option, to be €450–780 million. The Federal Ministry of Transport requested that the state of Baden-Württemberg meet half of these costs. The state rejected this demand. According to Deutsche Bahn there is no consensus on a route running parallel with the Autobahn. According to press reports, the additional cost of this option (compared to the route next to the current line as originally proposed) amounts to €300 million.

Contracts for the construction work on the planning approval sections 9.0 to 9.2 were expected to be awarded at the end of 2012. The value of the contracts was estimated at €200 million.

A number of citizens' initiatives, which have combined as the Interessengemeinschaft Bahnprotest an Ober- und Hoch-Rhein (“community of interest of the railway protest of the Upper and High Rhine”; abbreviated IG BOHR), which have been referred to as Baden 21, presented an alternative approach; 172,000 signatures were collected in support of this. The cumulative costs of the proposed measures on the budget presented by Deutsche Bahn were estimated to be over €900 million.

On 5 March 2012, the project advisory board, agreed to the so-called Bürgertrasse ("citizens route") including a freight bypass of Freiburg between Kenzingen and Buggingen as well as changes at Müllheim (displacement of the Buggingen junction to the south) to be realised by 2020. The related costs of €250 million in excess of the statutory requirements for noise and landscape protection (the 5 dB allowance normally given to railway projects in Germany compared to road projects was disregarded for this section), will be shared equally by the federal government and the state of Baden-Württemberg. €84 million of these costs will be incurred on the bypass of Freiburg and €166 million on the remaining route.

On 4 March 2013, the project advisory board called on Deutsche Bahn to abandon planning for the originally planned aboveground route. Deutsche Bahn announced plans to implement this recommendation as soon as funding was secured for such a tunnel.

== Progress on project sections ==
The project is divided into nine sections and 21 planning approval sections (in accordance with the municipal and district boundaries):

- Section 1: Karlsruhe–Rastatt-Süd (km 60.66–100.87): 24.3 km planned. The planning approval process was initiated on 27 June 1990.
  - Section 1.0: planning approval was sought only for the removal of level crossings.
  - Section 1.1: construction of two additional tracks for 250 km/h.
  - Section 1.2: Rastatt area, including the Rastatt Tunnel: The official groundbreaking ceremony took place on 30 July 2013. This section, which is estimated to cost €693 million, is to be completed in 2022.
- Section 2: Rastatt-Süd–Sinzheim (km 100.87–114.37): 13.5 km (open).
- Section 3: Bühl–Ottersweier (km 114.37–121.75): 7.4 km (open).
- Section 4: Achern–Sasbach (km 121.75–130.53): 7.8 km (open); when the plan for this section was approved in December 1987, it was the first plan to be finalised in the whole project.
- Section 5: Renchen–Appenweier (km 130.52–140.16): 9.6 km (open); the planning decision was finalised in July 1992.
- Section 6: Appenweier–Offenburg (km 140.16–145.48): 5.3 km (open)
- Section 7: Offenburg–Herbolzheim (km 145.48–178.00): 32.6 km (planned)
  - Section 7.1: Offenburg Süd–Hohberg (about 8.7 kilometres): closely "bundled" with the existing Rhine Valley Railway. Between Offenburg and the crossing of the Mühlbach (in southern Offenburg), the passenger traffics will use tracks rebuilt on the current route; from the Mühlbach, new tracks will be built to the northwest of the existing tracks and be used by long-distance traffic. The design speed in Offenburg is between 80 and 200 km/h because of the confined conditions; south of a curve in Albersbösch/Hildboltsweier, the high-speed line is designed for 250 km/h. The regional planning procedure was completed in May 2002. The resulting continuous bundling of the new line with the existing Rhine Valley Railway (known as Bündelungstrasse A3) was used as the basis of a developed design that was submitted for planning approval in May 2007. Overall, 10.4 kilometres of noise barriers and passive noise protection was planned for the approximately 4,000 residences affected. No changes, apart from soundproofing, were provided in Offenburg. During the development of the plan in the summer of 2008, 46,000 private objections were received; this was notified by Deutsche Bahn in March 2010. Deutsche Bahn expected in late 2008 that the planning decision would be made in 2011. The competent authority, the Administrative District of Freiburg declared at a hearing as part of the planning approval procedure on 18 January 2011 that the application documents could not be approved. The plan submitted was incomplete, partially incorrect and conflicted with applicable law. Whether the submitted option itself could ever be approved, even after modification, was questionable. On 19 November 2012, it was announced that a tunnel in Offenburg was generally feasible. On 26 March 2016, Deutsche Bahn advertised for design services for the section in a Europe-wide tender. A basic evaluation phase and a preliminary design phase are to be carried out from January 2017 to the end of August 2018. The next phase of design and the planning approval phase are provided as an option from September 2018 to the end of June 2024 and the detailed design from September 2025 to the end of December 2036. The contract is scheduled to be awarded between the end of June 2024 and the end of September 2025.
  - Section 7.2: Hohberg–Friesenheim (km 154.2 to 161.2): closely bundled existing and newly built tracks (for 250 km/h); the centres of the various tracks are 8.1 metres apart; on the line at the site of a possible new station at Niederschopfheim the tracks will be 11.4 metre apart (to provide room for an island platform). Friesenheim station is to be rebuilt. This work on this section was considered to be an upgrade of existing railway facilities and it did not require the initiation of a regional planning process; DB did not provided information on alternative routes. Since the measures providing noise protection covered the existing tracks, they would reduce the burden on local residents, according to DB. The planning approval procedure was launched in October 2003; in 2006, the decision on the planning application was expected to be handed down in 2008 or 2009. The public hearing has been held.
  - Section 7.3: Lahr–Mahlberg (km 161–172): in this section, the existing line would also be rebuilt with four tracks, replacing the current two tracks. The new tracks would be built to the west of the existing Rhine Valley Railway and would be designed for 250 km/h. DB has not presented information on alternative routes. Orschweier station would get a new island platform and a new underpass; a new siding would also be built. On 3 July 2007, Deutsche Bahn presented the planning approval documents for the 10.9 kilometer section. The hearings were held at the end of 2008. The planning approval decision was expected to be reached by 2011, according to DB's planning status at the end of 2008.
  - Section 7.4: Ettenheim–Herbolzheim (km 172.1–178.0): the bundling of the original line (to the east) and a new line (to the west) are proceeding without regional planning process or the presentation of alternative route (see above). In the Ringsheim area the distance between the centres of the two inner tracks is increased from 8.1 to 21 m so that the local curve can be passed at 250 km/h. Ringheim and Herbolzheim stations are to be rebuilt (with an island platform instead of outer platforms). The planning approval procedure was initiated in August 2003; in 2006, the planning approval decision was expected in 2008 or 2009. The public hearing has been held.
- Section 8: Kenzingen–Heitersheim (km 178.00–222.40): 44.4 kilometre (planned)
  - Section 8.0: Herbolzheim–Riegel (km 178.00–184.50): parallel routing of the high-speed tracks and the freight tracks in the north, in the south (km 182) a grade separated junction designed for rail freight operating at 160 km/h (route 4280) from the Rhine Valley railway to the bypass of the Freiburger Bucht (“Freiburg Bay”), which will run next to the A 5 from km 185. The design speed is between 130 and 250 km/h. Planning approval was applied for in May 2004. The public hearing has been held.
  - Section 8.1: Riegel–March (km 184.50–195.889): new freight-only line built close to the A 5. 8.1 kilometres of noise barriers would be built. The planning approval procedure was launched in December 2006; in 2009, the planning decision was expected in 2012. The design speed is 160 or 200 km/h. The planning proposal was resubmitted at the end of 2014 to the Federal Railway Office. In 2014, DB did not expect construction to begin before 2020. The total cost is estimated to be more than €100 million.
  - Section 8.2: Freiburg–Schallstadt (km 195.889–212.875): bypass of the Freiburger Bucht “bundled” with (running next to) the A 5. The planned cut-and-cover Mengen Tunnel (1.956 m; km 209 to 211) will pass under the Alemannenbuck ("Alemanni buckle") ridge to the west of Munzingen. The upgrade of each carriageway of the A 5 to three lanes was taken into consideration during the planning. The design speed is 160 or 200 km/h. The planning approval procedure was initiated in December 2006 and in February 2010 it was expected to be completed in 2012. The public hearing had not been held as of May 2010.
  - Section 8.3: Bad Krozingen–Heitersheim (km 212.875–222.571): return the goods railway bypass to the Rhine Valley Railway alignment from the alignment parallel with the A5 in largely flat terrain and possibly further south. The design speed is 160 or 200 km/h. The planning approval procedure had been initiated (as of 2006). The public hearing has been held. The federal and state governments are financing the additional cost of a so-called Bürgertrasse ("citizens route").
    The section has now been divided into two sections 8.3a and 8.3b. In 2013, new zoning section 8.4 was formed, comprising the bulk of the former section 8.3. It begins north of Tunsel and ends in the Müllheim area. From Tunsel to the Buggingen area, the line will run in a cutting and in Hügelsheim the line will run close to the Rhine Valley Railway. Deutsche Bahn planned to submit the documents for the planning approval procedure in 2015 (as at the end of 2013).
- Section 9: Buggingen–Basel (km 222.40–271.61) (in operation/under construction, 37.4 kilometres); the section was divided in the mid-1990s; between 1990 and 1996, no planning work was carried out due to a lack of available funds.
  - Section 9.0: Buggingen–Auggen: grade-separated connections to the Freiburg freight bypass in the west and the passenger tracks at Buggingen station. The planning approval request was initiated in August 2003. The public hearing has been held. The section has been divided into two sections (9.0a and 9.0b). While planning for the northern part of section 9.0a is being revised to implement the "citizens route", the financing agreement was signed on 21 January 2013 for the southern section 9.0b, stretching from Müllheim to Auggen. In this six-kilometre section, two additional tracks are to be built to the east of the existing line. The planning decision was expected in the summer of 2013. The Federal Government and Deutsche Bahn are to invest €200 million in it. The completion of the preliminary design was announced at the end of May 2013. In 2014, the Baden-Württemberg Ministry of Transport suggested the lowering of the route between Buggingen and Müllheim to increase noise abatement. The additional cost of the proposal, which will benefit a maximum of 300 households, was later estimated to be from €240 to 300 million.
  - Section 9.1: the planning approval for the 21 km-long section (including the Katzenberg Tunnel) was applied for in 1997. The planning approval was issued on 22 November 2002. The first works began in December 2002. A number of complaints from neighbouring communities, citizens and businesses against the planning decision were dismissed by the Administrative Court of Baden-Württemberg at the end of January 2004. The section was opened in December 2012.
  - Section 9.2: Haltingen–Weil am Rhein: parallel routing of long-distance traffic (east side) and freight railway (west side) on the five-kilometre long section. North of Haltingen the regional passenger tracks separate from the freight tracks running to the south. South of Weil the regional tracks connect with the mainline tracks of the Rhine Valley Railway. Both of the junctions with the regional tracks are grade-separated with climbs of up to 4.0 percent. In Haltingen, long-distance passenger traffic overtakes freight traffic, especially freight trains running to and from the Katzenberg Tunnel. In addition, line 4411 (Weil am Rhein–Basel Badischer Bahnhof) passes under the line in Weil. West of the freight line there is an extension of the Basel marshalling yard (six tracks with a useful length of 750 metres and three locomotive storage tracks), partly on German and partly on Swiss territory. Planning approval for this section was applied for in 2000. The substantially changed route adopted in 2005, meant that a new planning approval had to be applied for. The planning approval was finalised on 1 February 2010. Pre-construction work started on 8 February 2010. The remaining construction work between Weil and Haltingen was scheduled to begin in August 2010. Numerous route alternatives had been examined for this section. The work was scheduled to be completed by 2012. During the final stage, a total of ten kilometres of noise barriers were built, which were up to five metres high, to reduce noise levels, compared to the pre-existing situation, by up to 19 dB (A). Other improvements for this section were still being considered (as of October 2010).
  - Section 9.3: Basel. The 3.1 km-long section runs from the German-Swiss national border via the Badischer Bahnhof (Baden line station in Basel) to the northern bank of the Rhine. This connects with the new Basel Rhine Bridge, which was taken into operation in October 2012. Planning approval has been applied for and the funding has been secured (as of May 2013). Deutsche Bahn intends to submit the finalised planning application to the Swiss Federal Office of Transport (Bundesamt für Verkehr) in the second quarter 2014; construction is scheduled to start at the end of 2015 (as of February 2014). The planning approval process is being conducted under Swiss law.

== Costs and financing ==
In 2013, Deutsche Bahn estimated that the cost of the project would be €6.172 billion in April 2013 prices. €2.27 billion had been spent on it up to the end of 2014. DB's estimate had increased to €7.1 billion in mid-2015.

The costs were estimated in mid-2012 as amounting to €5.7 billion, plus a little more than €1 billion for planning costs. According to the Federal Government in January 2013, the future resource requirements would amount to about €3.66 billion. Of these, around €1.23 billion is attributable to sections that are ready for construction or under construction, that is planning approval sections 1, 9.0b, 9.1, 9.2 and 9.3.

At the end of 2007, the total cost was expected to be around €4.5 billion. Approximately €4.2 billion of which would come from the federal government, about €250 million from Deutsche Bahn's own funds and about €50 million through construction grants from third parties such as the European Union. By mid-2005 about €1.6 billion had already been spent. The project was included in the Federal Transport Infrastructure Plan 2003 as a “priority need”. The bulk of the financing was provided by the federal government. €108 million was invested in 2006.

In the spring of 2005, the federal government announced an additional €500 million for railway projects by 2008, including upgrades and new construction. In 2008, €75.4 million was spent on the project. Previously incurred costs added up to €1,789 million. In 2010, €99.71 million was invested, giving an estimated cumulated cost of €5.743 billion. The estimated total cost had risen to €6.172 billion in 2012. By mid-2010 about €1.8 billion had been invested in the project.

Deutsche Bahn justified the cost increase over the estimated cost of 2003 (€4.5 billion) as an acceptable variation from the nominal value of the construction cost at the planned completion (around €580 million), changes in specification due to changed policies and adjustments as a result of the planning approval process (approximately €520 million) and additional construction work between Rastatt and Offenburg (about €100 million). €1.3 billion was spent on the completed section between Rastatt Süd and Offenburg.

In mid-September 2010, the financing agreement was signed for sections 9.2 and 9.3, with a total length of 8.5 km, for a total of almost €400 million (covering planning and construction costs). According to the federal government, financing had also been secured for section 9.3 (Badischer Bahnhof). This was awaiting approval by the Swiss authorities in October 2011.

Part of the project's finances came from a fund of around €1 billion that had been set aside to be invested from 2012 to 2015 for additions to the rail network. These funds, in turn, came in part from the dividend that has been paid by Deutsche Bahn to the Federal Government since 2011.

In 2010, about €56 million was invested in the project; in 2011, about €94 million; in 2012, about €88 million; in 2013, about €69 million; and in 2014, about €74 million (preliminary estimate). In 2012 and 2013, the European Union contributed with a total of €33.7 million. During the current funding period to 2015, the EU is likely to participate with almost €90 million in finance. This would correspond to about ten percent of project costs during this period. €350 million have been earmarked by 2020.
