= Rastatt Tunnel =

Railway tunnel in Baden-Württemberg, Germany

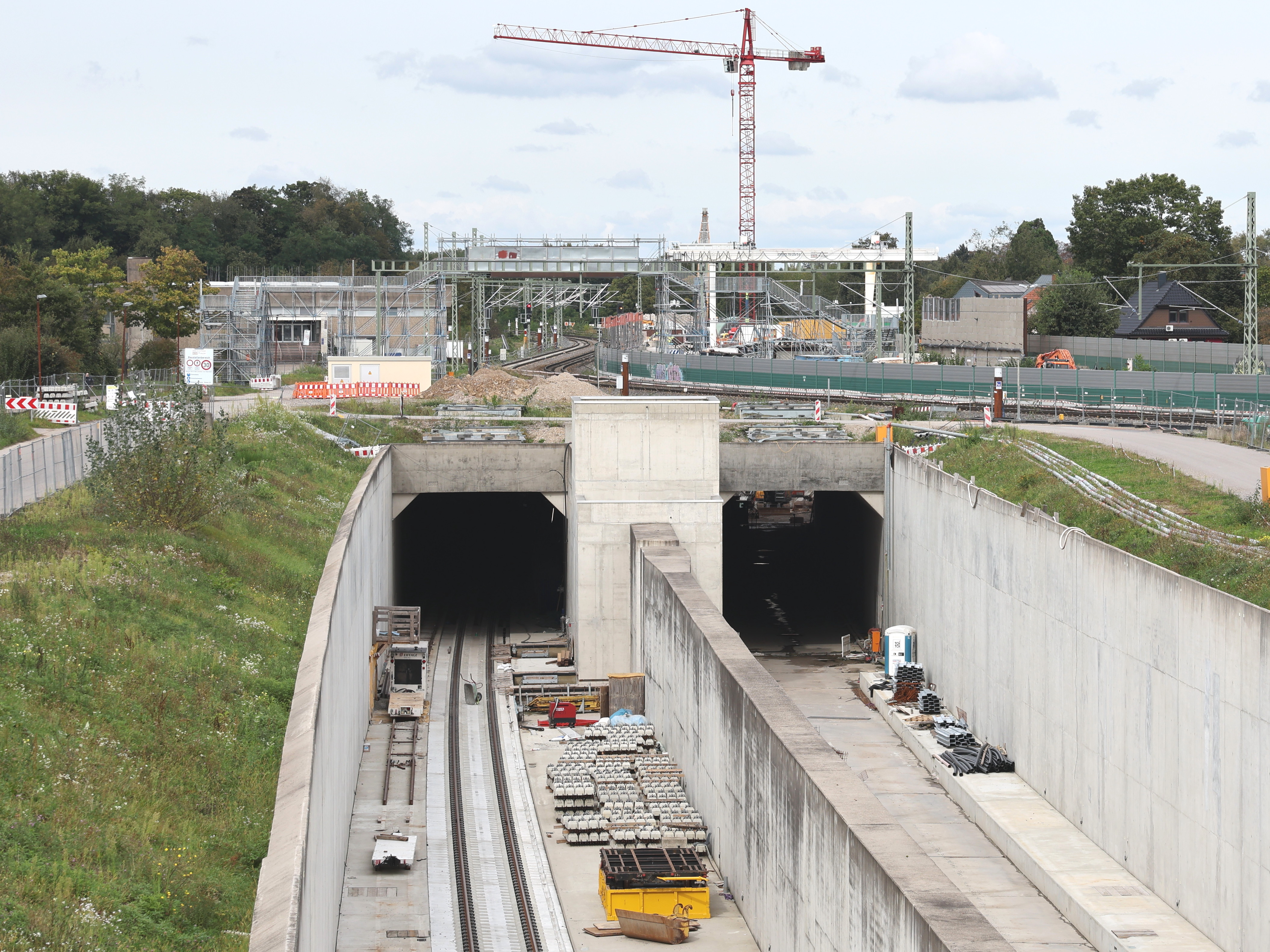
- South portal, 2024
- Interactive map of Rastatt Tunnel

Overview
- Line: Karlsruhe–Basel high-speed railway
- Location: Rastatt, Germany
- Coordinates: North portal: 48°52′22″N 8°14′9″E; South portal: 48°50′39″N 8°12′52″E
- Start: Ötigheim
- End: Niederbühl

Operation
- Constructed: May 2016 - August 2025
- Opened: 2026 (planned)
- Owner: Deutsche Bahn
- Character: 2 bores

Technical
- Design engineer: DB ProjektBau
- Length: 4,270 m (14,010 ft)
- No. of tracks: 2
- Track gauge: 1,435 mm (4 ft 8 1/2 in) standard gauge
- Electrified: 15 kV/16.7 Hz AC overhead catenary
- Operating speed: 250 km/h (160 mph) (max)

The Rastatt Tunnel is a railway tunnel that is currently under construction on the Karlsruhe–Basel high-speed railway under Rastatt in the German state of Baden-Württemberg. Once complete, the line will be used by long-distance passenger services and freight. It will form part of the Rotterdam–Genoa corridor; the tunnel is also part of the Main line for Europe project between Paris and both Bratislava and Budapest.

Having been under consideration since the 1970s, and given planning approval during 1996, the tunnel's construction was delayed by decades due to a lack of financing. During 2013, construction finally commenced with the awarding of a contract to Arbeitsgemeinschaft Tunnel Rastatt ("Rastatt tunnel construction community"). In 2012, it was projected that Rastatt Tunnel should be opened during 2022. Being financed by the German federal government, early projections forecast a total cost of around €693 million.

On 12 August 2017, there was a collapse during the construction of the tunnel's eastern bore. This collapse not only affected the tunnel, but also stopped operations on the Rhine Valley Railway, disrupting international rail traffic; the line was not reopened until on 2 October 2017. While construction work on the unaffected western bore was resumed during September 2017, the eastern bore was intentionally sealed with concrete as a measure to stabilise the ground. The project was re-planned to account for the collapse; as of August 2019, the eastern bore is intended to be dug out using traditional cut-and-cover construction methods. The Rhine Valley Railway will also be relocated during the renewed construction phase to minimise the potential impact of further instability. Tunnelling was completed in August 2025, with the tunnel planned to come into service by the end of 2026.

== Route ==
The 4,270-metre-tunnel (2.7 mi) will pass under the entire Rastatt urban area, the existing Rhine Valley Railway and the Federbach flats. It is the largest tunnel in terms of cross-section to be built on the high-speed line and begins east of Ötigheim and ends at Niederbühl. The distance between the track-centres of the two single-track tunnels is 26.5 metres (87 ft) and they are linked at 500-metre (1,600 ft) intervals by cross passages. To the north and south are trough structures with a length of 800 or 895 metres (2,625 or 2,936 ft) connecting to the rail tracks on the surface.

The gradient descends from both portals towards the centre of the tunnel. The two tracks are largely in circular tunnels with an inner radius of 4.80 metres (15.7 ft) in sections with an open design a rectangular cross-section has been chosen with an equivalent cross-sectional area.

The planned cover of the tunnels is between 3 and 20 metres (10 and 65 ft). The tunnels will run through sandy-gritty subsoil, mostly under the water table. The tunnel is the centerpiece of a 17-kilometre-long (11 mi) section of new line, which is designed for operations at 250 km/h (160 mph). The long-distance passenger services and part of the rail freight traffic passing through the corridor are expected to use it.

The local geology largely comprises sedimentary rock, while various underground rivers are also present in the vicinity; the Rhine itself is roughly seven kilometres west of Rastatt. It has been observed that there is a high presence of ground water around the tunnel's route, which is particularly concentrated around the sandy sediments found up to 10 metres below surface level.

== History ==
=== Planning ===
Between 1970 and 1983, more than 20 above ground options for section 1, to which the tunnel belongs, were considered. Under planning procedures introduced in 1983, five main above or underground options in the area Rastatt with different design speeds were examined. In its spatial planning assessment, the administration of the Karlsruhe region called on Deutsche Bundesbahn to discard the aboveground options and to provide for a tunnel under Rastatt. As there is mainly rail-freight operating on the line and to achieve permissible noise levels for the local residents and avoid noise mitigation at the vehicles and tracks a tunnel was planned in the sandy plains of the Rhine valley. Also to avoid construction noise a construction in mining technique was foreseen instead of cut and cover what would be much simpler in this environment. The initially planned route of the new line through Durmersheim, Bietigheim and Ötigheim was fought intensely by local residents. Under political pressure, the new route was eventually moved to follow the already planned deviation of federal highway 36. According to Deutsche Bahn (DB), this transfer was possible at no additional cost, taking into account the need to resolve local issues if the previously considered route was chosen. According to DB, the selected tunnel solution is more economical, has greater capacity, would allow more efficient operations and would allow shorter journey times. As a result, the regional planning process was launched in July 1986 with the proposed route following the proposed new federal highway closely and then passing through a tunnel. In the middle of 1987, Deutsche Bundesbahn intended to initiate the planning approval process in late 1987. The B36 bypass was built between 2002 and 2004.

The planning process for section 1 was launched on 27 June 1990. Due to the high cost of the tunnel solution, possible savings were investigated in 1991 and 1992, including other routes for the tunnel and a shorter tunnel. The planning approval procedure was completed on 19 March 1996. After several complaints were dismissed, the decision on section 1.2, to which the tunnel belongs, was finalised on 11 August 1998.

In the spring of 1997, the Federal Ministry of Transport commissioned Deutsche Bahn to carry out a study comparing an aboveground route with the underground route. The result was verified by the Federal Railway Authority (Eisenbahn-Bundesamt) and notified to the Baden-Württemberg state government in December 1997. The study confirmed that, an aboveground route would have a similar cost as a tunnel, but it would not provide the same increase in capacity.

In 2000, the planned tunnel would have had a length of 4,540 m (2.82 mi). The northern portal would have been at federal highway 462 and the southern portal would have been near Autobahn 5. In 2002, the tunnel's planned length was 4,270 m (2.65 mi). The northern and southern portals had been moved to the north. In mid-2010, the length of the tunnel was quoted as 4,225 m (2.6 mi).

In early 2009, it was intended to revise the planning for the Rastatt Tunnel, which was now over ten years old and to begin construction in early 2011. Both would be financed from funds from the economic stimulus package II. Because of the high financial requirements and the long duration of the project, it was later separated from the stimulus package. In 2011, Deutsche Bahn proposed an amendment to the plan, with among other things, the longitudinal spacing of the cross tunnels reduced from 1,000 to 500 metres (3,300 to 1,600 ft) and special construction methods in the portal area to deal with tunnel boom. Among other things, the route of the eastern tunnel was shifted slightly to give a uniform distance of 12 m (39 ft) between the airlock doors of the cross tunnels. The amended plans provided for a new safety concept over a length of 2,260 m (1.40 mi). The amendment was approved in November 2012. According to a media report the amendments to the plan were necessary because of new safety regulations (as of February 2012).

On 24 August 2012, the Federal Ministry of Transport, Building and Urban Development concluded a financing agreement on the northernmost section of the Rhine Valley Railway. It includes a 16 km long (9.9 mi) northern section of line, which includes the Rastatt Tunnel. The section is designed for operations at up to 250 km/h (160 mph). At the end of February 2012, a notice was published on the tendering of the construction contract for zoning section 1, to which the tunnel belongs. The estimated contract value was €808 million. Tendering and contracting were to run from May 2013 to August 2014.

=== Construction ===
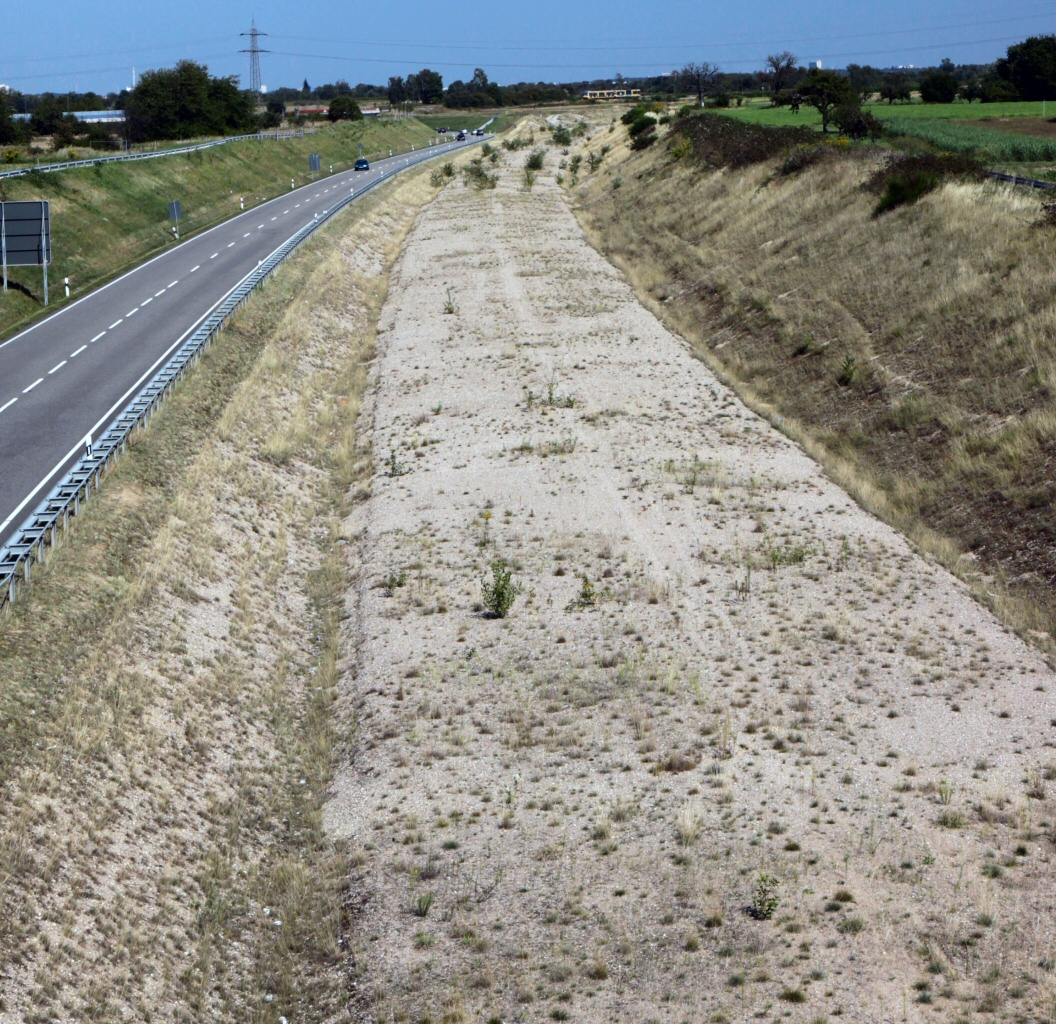
Already finished subgrade of the approach line in the Durmersheim area in September 2009

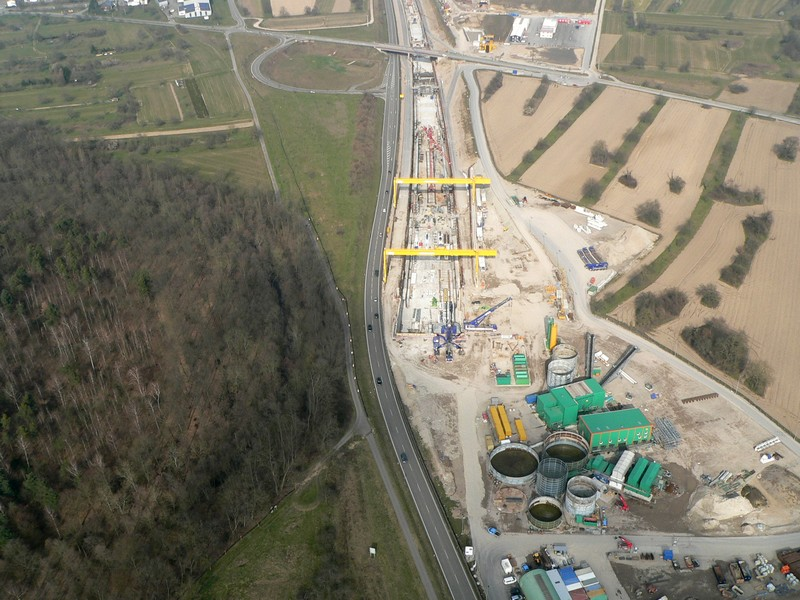
North portal of Rastatt Tunnel in March 2016

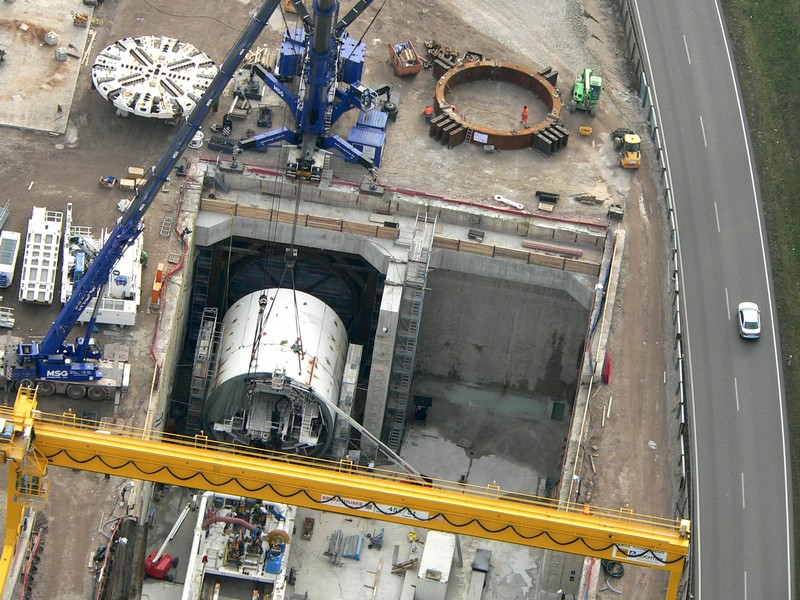
Assembly of the tunnel boring machine in March 2016

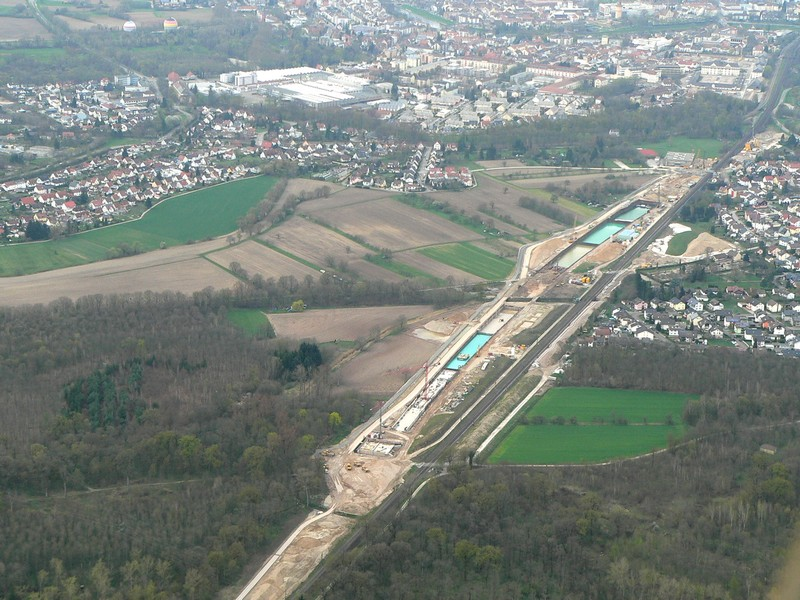
South portal of Rastatt Tunnel in April 2016

During 2001, the construction interval was forecast to take around six years to complete. However, prior to any work commencing, the construction phase of the project was subject to multiple postponements; according to the European Commission, these delays were due to a lack of available funds.

On 7 April 2011, fresh exploratory drilling for the tunnel began in the district of Niederbühl. Another exploration program began between Ötigheim and Rastatt Süd on 9 May 2012. Three rigs were due to drive 40 holes to depths of up to 40 metres (130 ft) by October 2012. Work on the ramp at the northern tunnel portal was tendered in March 2013.

On 30 July 2013, the official ground-breaking ceremony was held at the future groundwater basin under Autobahn 5 in Niederbühl. This was to allow construction work to commence between Basheide junction and Rastatt Süd. The work was expected to be completed by 2015. At the end of 2013, work began on the construction of the northern groundwater basin. As part of works worth about €13 million, a 700-metre long (2,300 ft) and up to 29-metre wide (95 ft) excavation pit was established and approximately 300,000 cubic metres (11 million cubic feet) of material and 11,400 square metres (123,000 sq ft) of sheet piles were installed. The work was expected to be completed by October 2014 (as of late 2013). It was expected that the construction of the actual groundwater basin would begin in early 2015, By the end of March 2014, the earthworks for the northern groundwater basin has been completed. Starting in July 2014, sheet piles were driven into the ground in preparation of further construction activity commencing.

The contract for construction of the shell of the tunnel was awarded to Arbeitsgemeinschaft Tunnel Rastatt ("Rastatt tunnel construction community"), a company founded specifically to undertake this project. The technical leadership was taken by Ed. Züblin AG and the commercial leadership by Hochtief AG. The tunnel contract is worth €312 million; making it the biggest contract of the project in terms of value. On 4 August 2014, the contract for the shell of the tunnel was signed in Berlin. Construction work was expected to start in November 2014 with the preparation of a building site area in Ötigheim. The first tunneling machine was expected to be assembled in April 2015 and the driving of the tunnel was expected to start in October 2015. The completion of the shell was intended to be achieved at the end of the first quarter of 2018. The completion of technical construction is to follow in 2020 and trial operations are scheduled to start in 2022.

Due to the geological and hydrological environment of the tunnel, a large part of it is being driven by two tunnel boring machines (TBMs), which travelled its length along the north-to-south alignment. Some of its length was tunnelled through ground that has been stabilised by a combination of ground freezing (using either brine or liquid nitrogen) and concrete injections. Around 3,800 m (12,500 ft) of the tunnel would be bored, about 470 m (1,540 ft) would be built using the New Austrian Tunnelling method or by cut-and-cover.

In early December 2014, Deutsche Bahn provided updated details of the procurement of the two TBMs. The two 90-metre long (300 ft) and 1,750 t (1,720-long-ton; 1,930-short-ton) machines would be provided by Herrenknecht AG. At the time, the first machine was to be assembled in September 2015 and excavation work was set to commence during December 2015. The assembly of the second machine would begin in early January 2016 and the excavation would begin in April 2016. With a 10.97-metre wide (36.0 ft) boring shield, each TBM would prepare a usable section of 9.6 m (31 ft). The contract for the two machines was estimated to be worth €36 million. The structure of the tunnel was still estimated to be completed in the first quarter of 2018.

According to an updated schedule of June 2015, the beginning of the tunnel drive had been delayed by three months to the spring of 2016 as the first parts of the tunneling machine would be delivered at the end of 2015. The completion of the tunnel shell is still scheduled for July 2018. From the end of 2015, the first parts of the TBM were delivered at the north portal at Ötigheim and were assembled there in preparation for driving the eastern tube from early February.

The first TBM was symbolically launched on 8 December 2015. It was expected to start driving the eastern tunnel at the end of May 2016.

A stretch of earthworks with a length of about 7.5 km (4.7 mi) was completed to the north of the tunnel at the end of 2006 and it has been extended at Ötigheim since early 2013. In April 2016, the construction of the tunnel's connections were put to tender.

==== August 2017 collapse ====
Sensors at the tunnel construction site at Niederbühl reported a lowering of the track on the existing line above the tunnel on 12 August 2017 at about 11:00. Signals along the line automatically set to danger, stopping all train traffic. The track had subsided by half a metre (1.6 ft) over a section of track that was about 6 to 8 metres (20 to 26 ft) long. In this area, the tunnel is covered by 5 m (16 ft) of material. Over the length of the bore, the ground was intentionally frozen with cooling liquid to −33 °C (−27 °F) to stabilise it. The bore was intended to run over a length of 205 m (673 ft) through completely frozen material, representing an innovation in the use of TBMs. As a result of a water spill, the tunnel was not accessible at first. At the time of the collapse, the breakthrough of the tunnel was believed to be close at hand.

Following work to stabilise the area, DB Netze commenced work to plan the line's reopening and resumption of construction. The line was initially expected to remain blocked until 26 August. By 22 August, a closure of the line until 7 October was expected. During the closure, an emergency bus service was established between Rastatt and Baden-Baden. This service was operated at six-minute intervals from 14 August; passengers were informed to expect extensions of travel time of at least an hour. The residents of four neighbouring houses were asked to leave them on 13 August.

In rail freight, DB rail operations worked on alternative concepts that focused on large-scale bypasses and transfers to other modes of transport. A change in the schedule of construction sites was considered. Within the framework of large-scale diversions, the Plochingen–Tübingen and Tübingen–Horb railways were temporarily operated around the clock on working days. The Netzwerk Europäischer Eisenbahnen estimated the revenue loss for freight companies at €12 million per week. Even with all the large-scale diversions, insufficient capacities would be available, since several detours were also blocked.

By 15 August 2017, according to DB information, work was already being carried out on the restoration of the line, although the stabilisation of the tunnel still had remaining queries to address. It was anticipated that a 50 m long (160 ft) section of the eastern tube would be filled with concrete in order to stabilise the ground, allowing the re-opening of the railway line as soon as possible. This process necessitated the abandoning of the existing TBM, which was valued at €18 million, as it would remain in the ground. At the time, the means of addressing the damaged eastern bore of the tunnel, and the project's overall completion, were unclear.

On 2 October 2017, the old rail line, which had been rendered unusable for nearly two months due to damage sustained from the collapse, was reopened. DB had constructed a large concrete slab, being 120 metres in length, 15 metres in width and one-metre deep, to effectively act as a bridge for the old ground level railway over the eastern bore; a second slab was built over the western bore as well to avoid any possibility of reoccurrence. A section of the old railway was removed, which included the lifting of the rails, 400 sleepers, overhead line electrification (OLE), and around 2,500 tonnes of ballast, and rebuilt nearby to reposition the line to run through the site of the bores over top of the two concrete slabs. According to industry publication Rail Engineer, the costs associated with both the line's closure and the wider disruption caused to rail customers has been estimated to be as high as €2 billion. Rail freight operators had sought compensation for the impact to their businesses caused by the collapse and subsequent disruption, some companies publicly criticised DB specifically for failing to provide a temporary low-speed diversionary line around the tunnel site and generally for its lack of disaster mitigation planning.

==== Resumption of work ====
Initially, tunnelling work on both bores was suspended on 12 August 2017 immediately following the collapse, the focus of work being switched to stabilisation efforts instead. However, being sufficiently confident in the condition of the western bore, boring activity resumed in the western bore during early September 2017. Work on the eastern bore, which had been heavily affected by the collapse, remained suspended indefinitely at this point. A detailed evaluation of ground conditions, which involved a total of 60 bore holes, was conducted to help ascertain responsibility for the tunnel collapse.

By early October 2017, proposals had been mooted for the recovery of the TBM's remains, which had been intentionally entombed in concrete, by digging it out of the ground; however, there was no immediate plan of how to resume construction of the eastern bore. By January 2018, such work was still pending and no recovery had taken place. By July 2018, limited activity was happening on the eastern bore, including the creation of an opening to act as an emergency escape and to aid logistics during further construction work.

During August 2019, DB Netze announced that construction activity on Rastatt Tunnel would be fully resumed during 2020, and that its completion date was now projected to occur during 2025, three years later than originally planned. As agreed, Arbeitsgemeinschaft Tunnel Rastatt would continue with work to finish the remaining 200 metres of the undamaged western bore, while DB shall reposition a 700-metre section of the old line to follow the course of the completed western bore on the surface, putting it clear of the eastern bore's construction site. After the repositioning, which was anticipated by 2021, the remaining portion of the eastern bore would be excavated using an open 'cut-and-cover' method after inserting concrete walls to the required depth. Once the tunnel is complete, it will be back filled and the old line repositioned above the eastern bore. Finishing work, including the construction of several cross passages and the entrance portals, as well as fitting-out, is projected to take until 2027.

In August 2025, Deutsche Bahn announced it had completed the civil works for the tunnel, having excavated around 52,000 m^{3} of earth.

== Costs ==
In 2012, it was projected that the project would have a total cost of around €693 million, including both the route and the tunnel itself; financing was provided by the German federal government.
