= Bad Bellingen =

Place in Baden-Württemberg, Germany

- Municipality
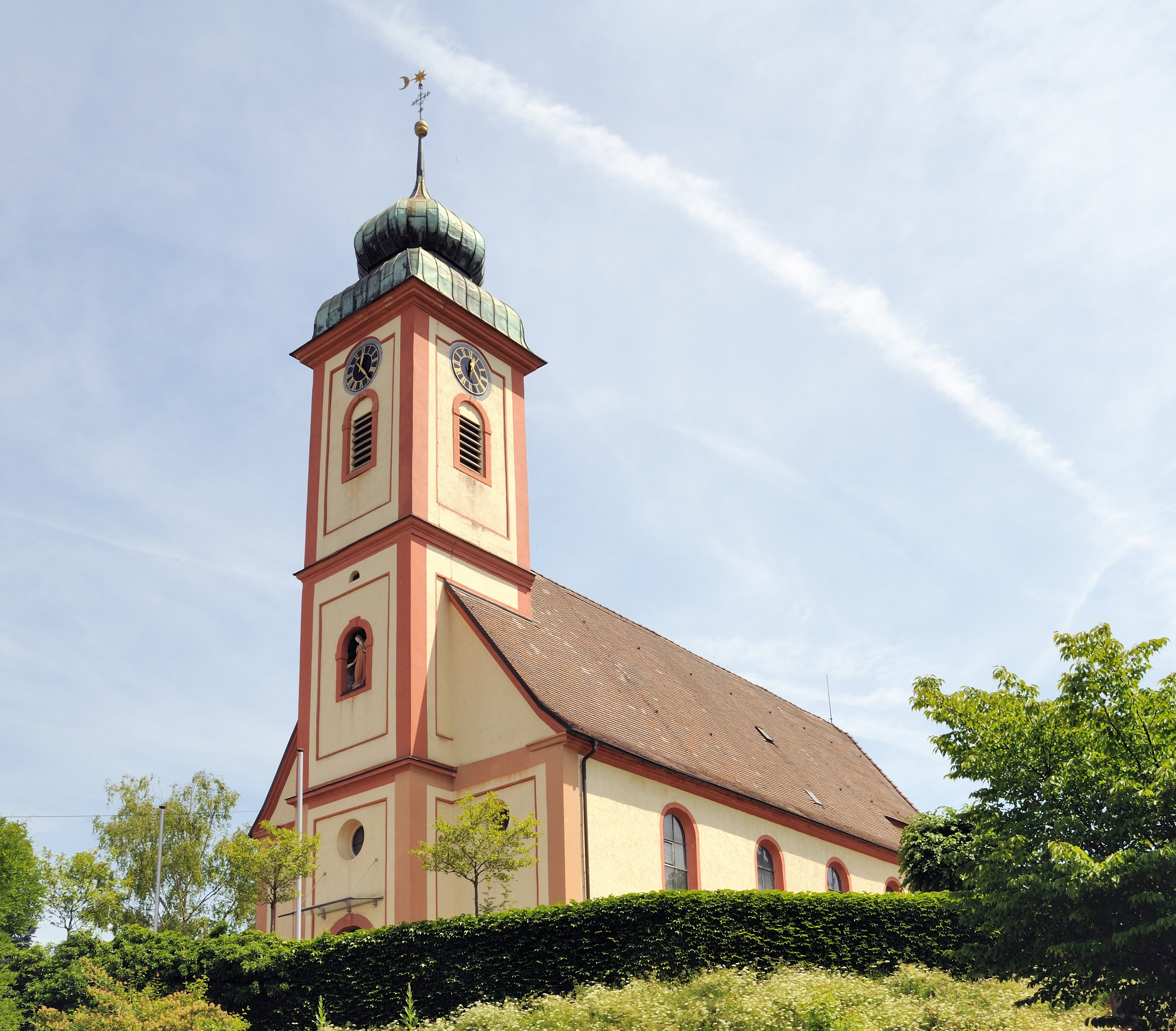
- Saint Leodegar Church

- Coat of arms

- Location of Bad Bellingen within Lörrach district
- Interactive map of Bad Bellingen
- Location within Germany Location within Baden-Württemberg
- Coordinates: 47°43′54″N 7°33′25″E
- Country: Germany
- State: Baden-Württemberg
- Admin. region: Freiburg
- District: Lörrach
- Subdivisions: 4

Government
  - Mayor (2018–26): Carsten Vogelpohl (CDU)

Area
  - Total: 16.93 km^{2} (6.54 sq mi)
- Elevation: 257 m (843 ft)

Population (2025-12-31)
  - Total: 5,238
  - Density: 309.4/km^{2} (801.3/sq mi)
- Time zone: UTC+01:00 (CET)
  - Summer (DST): UTC+02:00 (CEST)
- Postal codes: 79411–79415
- Dialling codes: 07635
- Vehicle registration: LÖ
- Website: www.gemeinde-bad-bellingen.de

Bad Bellingen (German pronunciation: [baːt ˈbɛlɪŋən]; High Alemannic: Bad Bellige) is a municipality in the German state of Baden-Württemberg. It is on the border with France to the west. It is in the German landkreis of Lörrach. The closest larger city is Müllheim which is about 10 km to the north.

Bad Bellingen is mostly known for its thermal bath (hence the name, "Bad" being German for "bath"). It is also historically a place where Germans have recovered from health issues as allowed by health rules in place before the turn of the 20th century.

The town is twinned with Reigoldswil in Switzerland.

== Points of interest ==
- Kurpark Bad Bellingen
