= Fonjallaz (surname) =

Fonjallaz is a surname. Notable people with the surname include:

- Arthur Fonjallaz (1875–1944), Swiss military figure, publisher and fascist
- Gaston Fonjallaz (born 1903), Swiss bobsledder
- Gustave Fonjallaz (born 1910), Swiss bobsledder
- René Fonjallaz (1907–1993), Swiss bobsledder
