= Fonjallaz =

Fonjallaz may refer to:

- Fonjallaz (surname)
- Fonjallaz (vineyard), a Swiss winery
