= Endulen e.V. =

German non-governmental organisation

- Founded: 2008
- Founder: Dr. med. Maria Dillmann; Dr. med. Florian Schneider
- Purpose: medical help, medical education, medical construction projects
- Location: Aufhausen, Germany
- Origins: Aufhausen, Germany
- Region served: Endulen and vicinity (Tanzania), Tanzania
- Method: education, training, guiding, help
- Employees: 22 members in Germany
- Website: www.endulen.de

Endulen e.V. is an association non-government organisation located in Germany. It was established 2008 by Maria Dillmann, MD and Florian Schneider, MD to support sustained health projects in Tanzania. There are projects in education, health training and professional health education organized and financially supported, as well as construction projects to improve the medical infrastructure and they give financial aid for urgent medical procedures and medical supply.

== Main activities in overview ==
From an association, founded 2008 with the goal of active support of the remote clinic in Endulen is grown an organisation which conducts sustained projects in the health field in Tanzania/East Africa. Main activities are:

- 1. Construction projects and their medical outfit
- 2. Medical education projects
- 3. Help in medical urgencies

== Start ==
The association "Endulen e.V." was founded from Maria Dillmann, MD and Florian Schneider, MD. They went after their university entrance diploma as temporary missionaries to Tanzania. After their return to Germany they decided to improve the situation of the local people in Tanzania. So they founded the nongovernmental organisation (NGO) "Endulen e.V. – Trage es im Herzen mit!" Since the foundation of the association in 2008, more than 250.000€ of donations have been collected (Status October 2016) and numerous projects have been realized. The association was named for the small village Endulen in the north of Tanzania, in the middle of the Ngorogoro Conservation Area. The village Endulen has neither regular water supply nor electricity or regular streets. Excluded from civilisation and technical progress, the nomadic tribe of the Maasai is living in this area. The only paved structure in this area is the 72-bed clinic Endulen Hospital, which is responsible for the medical care of around 72.000 people. In the meantime the projects of Endulen e.V. are not only restricted to the Maasai-Area around Endulen, but also other regions in north Tanzania will benefit.

== Financing ==
Endulen e.V. is financed through donations and most of the donations are from private persons. Other financing is through fund raising and the calendar sales.

== Administration ==
Endulen e.V. has 22 voluntary members. They are responsible for the daily work. The structure of the association can be seen in the organisation chart. Additional freelancers help us. Cooperations with other development aid organisations are ongoing and could be intensified. : "Action Medeor", "Initiative Teilen im Cusanuswerk e.V.", "twodecide e.V.", "Arbeitskreis Eine-Welt Dachau", German Embassy in Tanzania.

== Awards ==
"Endulen e.V. – take it with your heart!" has won several awards:

- Elsevier Award "Innovationsoskar" 2015
- 2011: Cusanuswerk Prize
- MLP "Award for outstanding social work"
- 2008: Jörg Hogen Student Prize
