= Bertha Benz =

German automobile pioneer, with husband Carl Benz

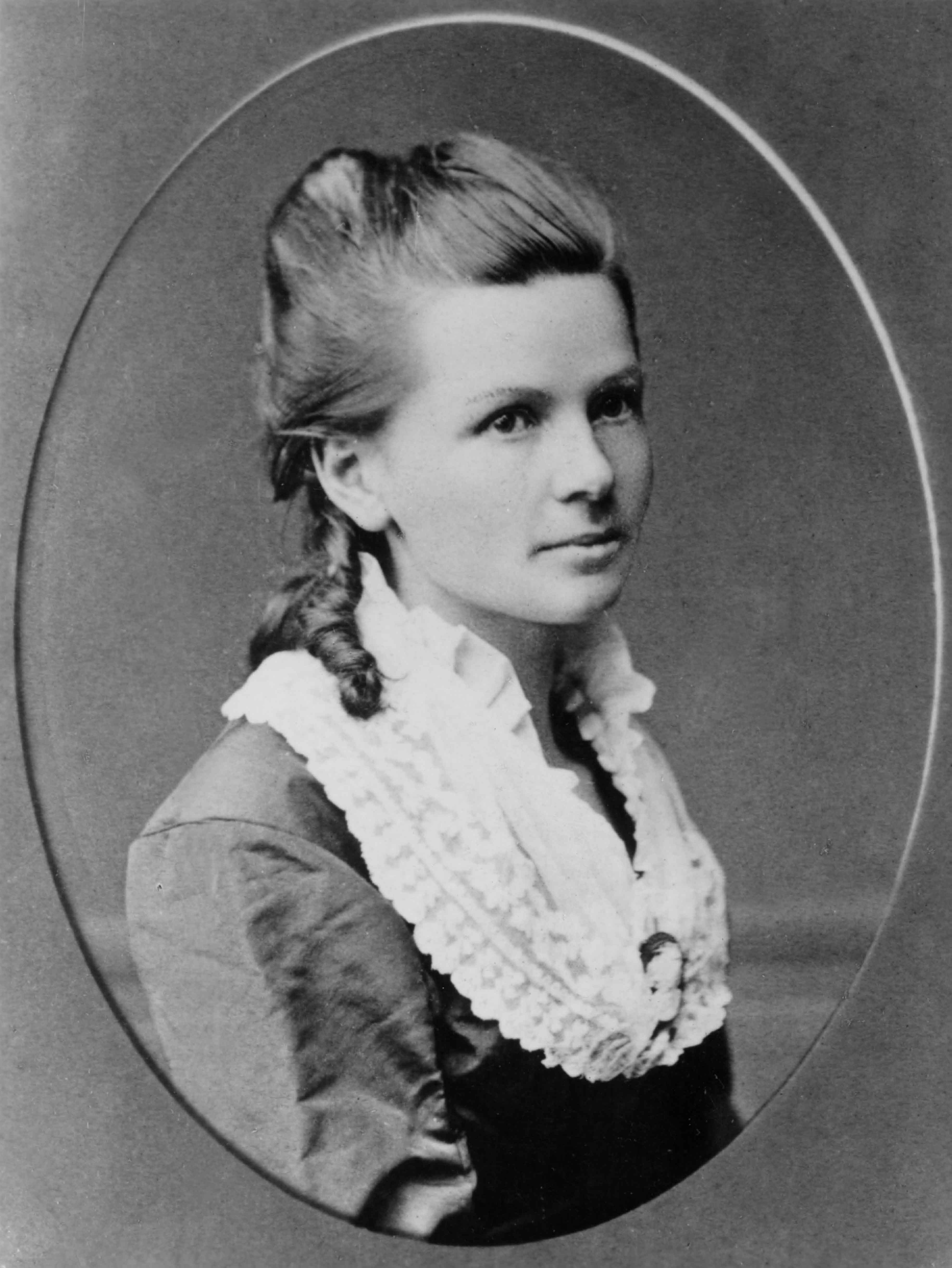
- Bertha Ringer, c. 1871, prior to her marriage to Carl Benz
- Born: Cäcilie Bertha Ringer; 3 May 1849; Pforzheim, Grand Duchy of Baden, German Confederation
- Died: 5 May 1944 (aged 95); Ladenburg, Greater German Reich
- Known for: First person in history to drive an automobile over a long distance
- Spouse: Carl Benz (m. 1872; died 1929)
- Children: 5

Bertha Benz (German: [ˈbɛʁta ˈbɛnts]; née Cäcilie Bertha Ringer; 3 May 1849 – 5 May 1944) was a German automotive pioneer. She was the business partner, investor and wife of automobile inventor Carl Benz. On 5 August 1888, she became the first person to drive an internal-combustion-engined automobile over a long distance, field testing the Benz Patent-Motorwagen, inventing brake lining and solving several practical issues during the journey of 105 km (65 miles). In doing so, she brought the Patent-Motorwagen worldwide attention and got the company its first general sales. Bertha Benz was not allowed to study in the Grand Duchy of Baden, and her financial and practical engineering contributions have long been overlooked until the 21st century.

== Early life and education ==
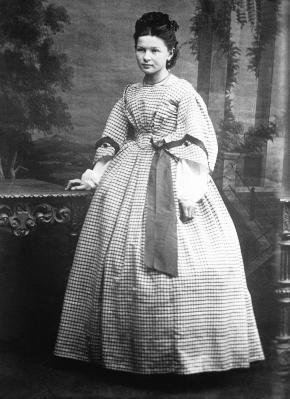
Bertha Benz at age 18, c. 1867

Cäcilie Bertha Ringer was born on 3 May 1849 to a wealthy carpenter family in Pforzheim. She was the third of nine children. Her father, Karl Friedrich Ringer, a master builder and carpenter, and her 20-year younger mother, Auguste Friedrich, were wealthy individuals who invested heavily in their children's educations in Pforzheim in the Grand Duchy of Baden. Her father became wealthy by speculating with real estate. The Ringer family was Lutheran in faith. She attended a boarding school in Pforzheim for 10 years and was known for her ambition and fascination with technological innovation, but could not pursue higher education, as women were not allowed to attend university at the time.

On 27 June 1869, during an excursion by the Eintracht Club, she met and fell in love with machine lover and tinkerer Carl Benz, who was five years her senior and penniless, but had a head full of crazy ideas, and who could talk better about technology than about feelings. In 1870, two years before her marriage, she used part of her dowry to invest in his failing iron construction company. As an unmarried woman, she was able to do so; after she married Benz, according to German law, Bertha lost her legal power to act as an investor.

== Adult life ==
On 20 July 1872, Bertha Ringer married Carl Benz at the St. Michael's Lutheran Castle Church in Pforzheim.

Thanks to her premarital financial support, Carl Benz moved on from his failing iron construction company to a new manufacturing venture, Benz & Cie, continuing to use her dowry as financial support, to pursue his lifelong dream of the first true automobile. In 1875/76, when Bertha was pregnant with her third child, Benz was able to get a two-stroke engine to work for the first time. Eventually, in December 1885, they finished work on the first horseless carriage, 13 years into their marriage. Karl Benz applied for the patent, but Bertha could not legally apply alongside him despite her financial and practical engineering contributions.

With cutting-edge bicycle constructions, the Model I Patent-Motorwagen was the original Patent Motor Car and the world's first automobile. The Model II was converted to a four-wheeler for test purposes, making it the only one of this model. On 3 July 1886, Karl Benz presented the Patent-Motorwagen automobile to the public in Mannheim. It had powered rear wheels with a ringed steel and solid rubber, steerable front wheel and optional seat arrangements and a folding top. Karl Benz was a poor marketer and faced competition by Gottlieb Daimler, which prompted his wife to undertake the test drive in 1888.

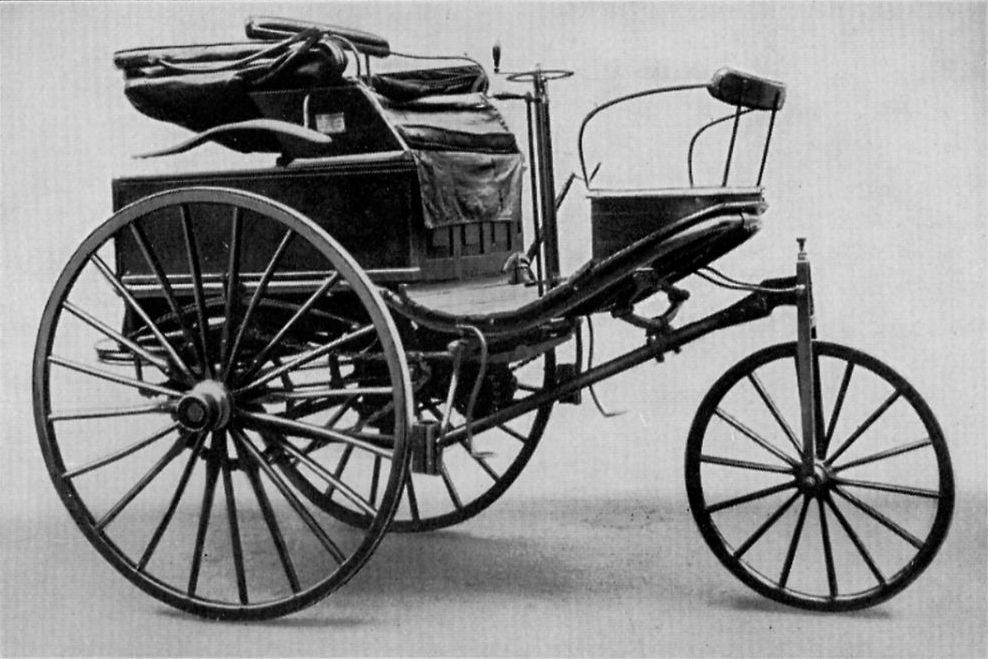
The model of Benz Patent-Motorwagen used by Bertha Benz for the highly publicized first long distance road trip, 106 km (66 mi), by automobile

=== First cross-country automobile journey, 1888 ===
Bertha Benz Memorial Route, with pins indicating various events along her journey (click to expand and click pins for information). The journey south is in Blue, the trip homeward (north) is in Red, and the Green portion is the Historical section of the route which more closely matches her original journey

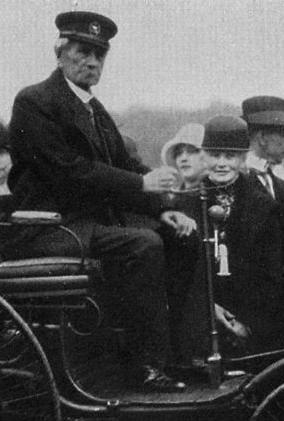
Carl and Bertha Benz 1925 – Zenodot Verlagsges. mbH

On 5 August 1888, 39-year-old Bertha Benz drove from Mannheim to Pforzheim with her sons Richard and Eugen, thirteen and fifteen years old respectively, in a Model III, without telling her husband and without permission of the authorities, thus becoming the first person to drive an internal-combustion-engined automobile a significant distance. Before this historic trip, motorized drives were merely very short trials, returning to the point of origin, made with assistance of mechanics. (Note: Journeys of 100 miles or more had been undertaken by steam-powered automobiles for almost 50 years. Disregarding early steam coaches, in 1840 Frank Hills of Deptford built a steam-powered carriage in which he made day trips including one of 128 miles to Hastings and back. In 1878 Amédée Bollée started series production of La Mancelle, a steam-powered carriage, one of which made the journey from Paris to Vienna and back. All these steam-powered vehicles used a crew, just as carriages did.) Following wagon tracks, this pioneering tour covered a one-way distance of about 106 km (66 mi).

Although the ostensible purpose of the trip was to visit her mother, Bertha Benz had other motives – to prove to her husband, who had failed to adequately consider marketing his invention, that the automobile in which they both had heavily invested would become a financial success once it was shown to be useful to the general public; and to give her husband the confidence that his constructions had a future.

She left Mannheim around dawn, solving numerous problems along the way. Bertha demonstrated her significant technical capabilities on this journey. With no fuel tank and only a 4.5-litre supply of petrol in the carburetor, she had to find ligroin, the petroleum solvent needed for the car to run. The solvent was only available at apothecary shops, so she stopped in Wiesloch at the city pharmacy, Stadt-Apotheke, to purchase the fuel. At the time, petrol and other fuels could only be bought from chemists [pharmacists in US English], and so this is how the chemist in Wiesloch became the first fuel station in the world.

She cleaned a blocked fuel line with her hat pin and used her garter as insulation material. A blacksmith had to help mend a chain at one point. When the wooden brakes began to fail, Benz visited a cobbler to install leather, making the world's first pair of brake linings. An evaporative cooling system was employed to cool the engine, making water supply a big worry along the trip. The trio added water to their supply every time they stopped. The car's two gears were not enough to surmount uphill inclines and Eugen and Richard often had to push the vehicle up steep roads. Benz reached Pforzheim somewhat after dusk, notifying her husband of her successful journey by telegram. She drove back to Mannheim several days later.

The trip was officially forbidden and Benz risked a penalty. There were no suitable roads and signs, only a few signposts. It was life-threatening because of the fragility of the car and the road conditions. The wagon was three-wheeled, but the paths were driven by four-wheeled horse-drawn carriages, so the dainty front wheel rattled over tufts of grass, sticks and stones.

The trip received a great deal of publicity, as she had sought, and was a key event in the technical development of the automobile. She reported everything that had happened along the way and made important suggestions, such as the introduction of an additional gear for climbing hills and brake linings to improve brake-power. The pioneering couple introduced several improvements after Bertha's experiences. Her trip demonstrated to the burgeoning automotive industry that test drives were essential to their business.

=== 1889–1929 ===
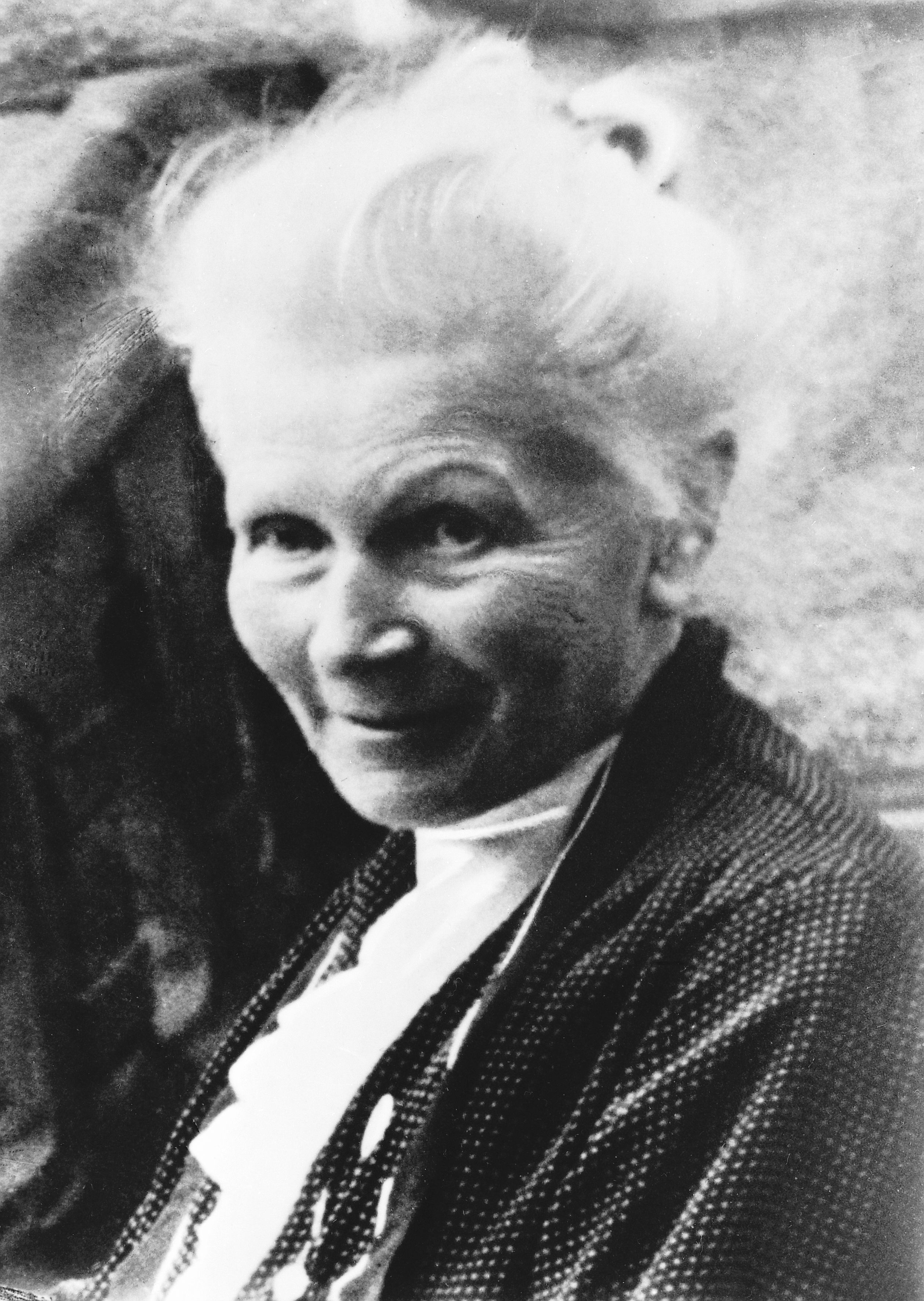
Bertha Benz in 1944

After Bertha's test drive, Benz & Cie. became the world's largest automobile company.

In 1906, the family moved to Ladenburg, where Karl, Bertha, and sons Eugen and Richard started another solely family-held automobile business, named Benz Sons (Benz Söhne), which remained family-owned. It folded in 1924 after years of German inflation 1914 to 1923.

In 1925, Karl Benz wrote the following in his memoirs: "Only one person remained with me in the small ship of life when it seemed destined to sink. That was my wife. Bravely and resolutely she set the new sails of hope."

In 1926, Benz & Cie. merged with Gottlieb Daimler and Wilhelm Maybach's company to form Daimler-Benz, which became home to the Mercedes-Benz. Karl Benz died in 1929 with the beginning of the Great Depression.

=== 1929–1944 ===
Withdrawn from the outside world, Bertha Benz lived out the remainder of her life in her villa in Ladenburg. Her fortunes had shrunk due to World War I and hyperinflation, but it did not seem to bother her, as she was accustomed to living modestly to the point of miserliness all her life. The misery of the people affected by the high level of unemployment impressed on her, and she wrote to a journalist that she would like to make her books available for a library so that unemployed people could at least read. In 1933, 84-year-old Bertha Benz is said to have greeted Adolf Hitler as the "savior of Germans". She and her family were very quickly co-opted by Nazi propaganda, and as early as Easter 1933, a National Socialist memorial was inaugurated for Carl Benz in Mannheim, in which Bertha participated. She later distanced herself from Hitler when she understood that his policies were leading to a new war.

On her 95th birthday, on 3 May 1944, she received the title of Honorary Senator of the Technical University of Karlsruhe, where her husband had studied – women were not allowed to study during her youth.

== Personal life and death ==
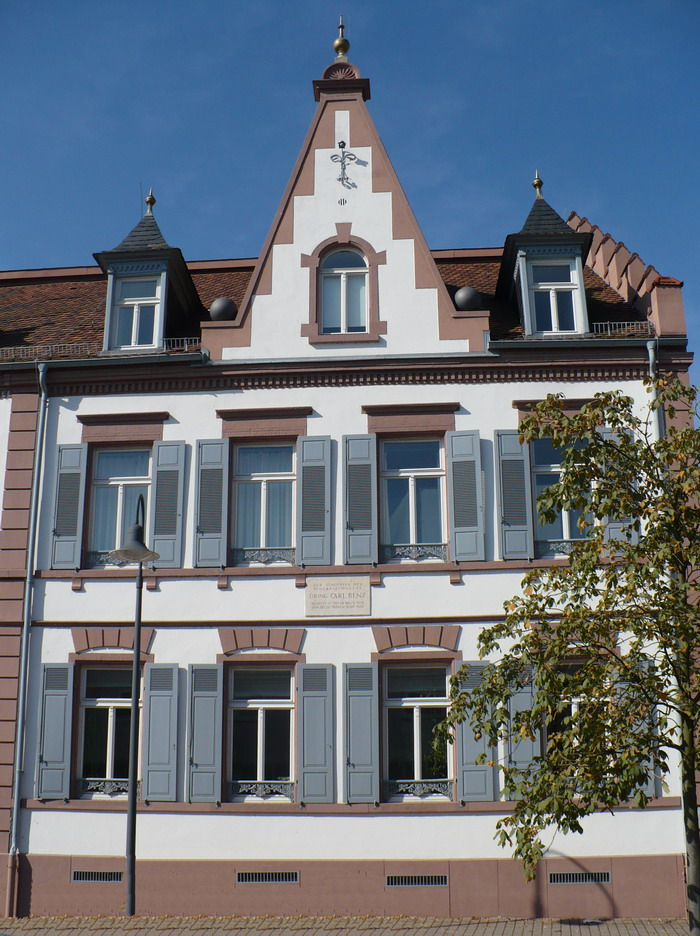
Last home of Karl and Bertha Benz, now the location of the Daimler and Benz Foundation in Ladenburg, Baden-Württemberg

On 20 July 1872, Bertha Ringer married Karl Benz. Together they had five children: Eugen (1873–1958), Richard (1874–1955), Clara (1876–1968), Thilde (1882–1974), and Ellen (1890–1973).

The Mannheimer Morgen quoted Bertha as "enterprising mother of five [who] led a strict regime. Karl Benz is described by contemporary witnesses as a "serious and just person", while his wife is said to have had an "aggressive nature"."

Bertha Benz died at age 95 in her village in Ladenburg on 5 May 1944.

== Posthumous honours, 21st century ==
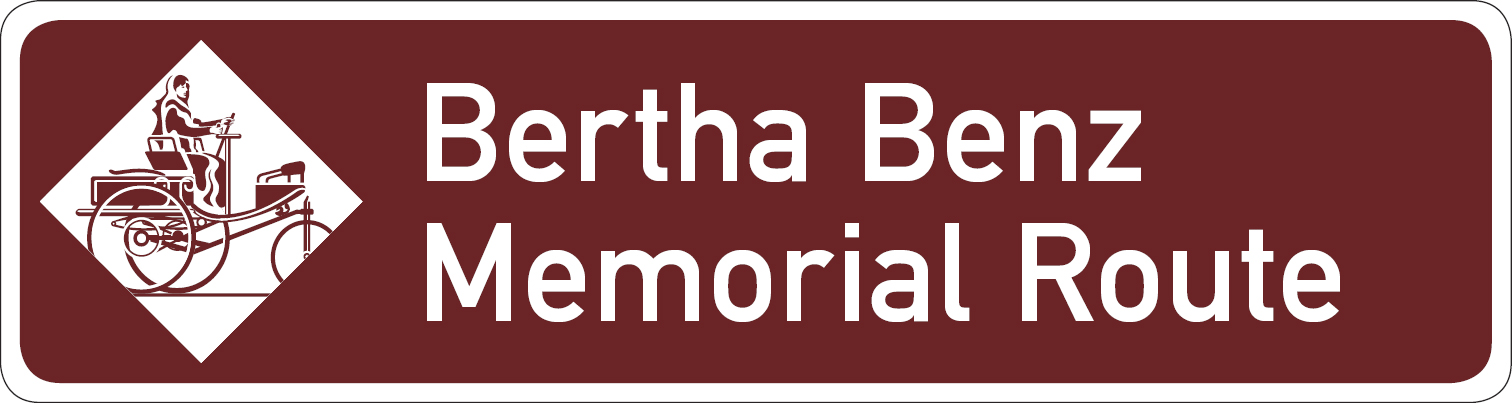
Official signpost of Bertha Benz Memorial Route

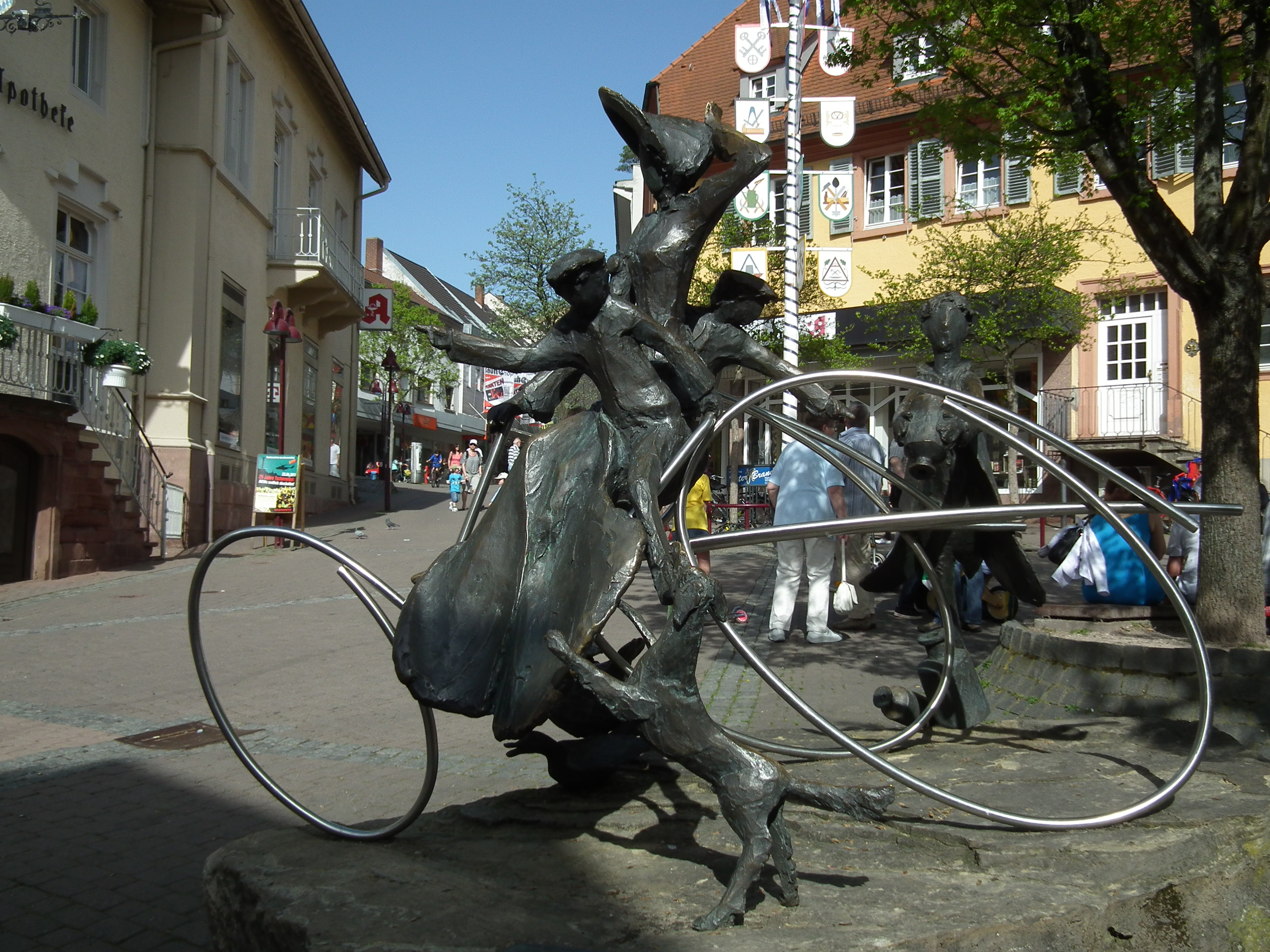
Bertha Benz monument in Wiesloch, where she made a stop to take in fuel at the city pharmacy, which is now dubbed "the first filling station in the world"

In 2008, the Bertha Benz Memorial Route was officially approved as a route of the industrial heritage of humankind, because it follows Bertha Benz's path during the world's first long-distance journey by automobile in 1888. Now it is possible to follow the 194 km of signs indicating her route from Mannheim via Heidelberg to Pforzheim (Black Forest) and back.

The Bertha Benz Challenge, embedded in the framework of the ceremony of Automobile Summer 2011, the official German event and birthday party commemorating the invention of the automobile by Carl Benz 138 years ago, took place on Bertha Benz Memorial Route on 10 and 11 September 2011. It was open for sustainable mobility – hybrid and electric, hydrogen and fuel cell vehicles, and other economical vehicles. The motto is Bertha Benz Challenge – Sustainable Mobility on the World's Oldest Automobile Road!

On 25 January 2011, Deutsche Welle (DW-TV) broadcast worldwide in its series, Made in Germany, a TV documentary on the invention of the automobile by Carl Benz, highlighting the very important role of his wife, Bertha Benz. The report is not only on the history of the automobile, but took a look at its future, shown by the Bertha Benz Challenge on 10 and 11 September 2011.

The 2011 documentary The Car is Born, produced by Ulli Kampelmann, centered on the first road trip by Bertha Benz.

In 2016, she was inducted into the Automotive Hall of Fame, 42 years after her husband was inducted.

In honor of International Women's Day in 2019, the modern Daimler company commissioned a four-minute advertisement dramatizing portions of Bertha Benz’ 1888 journey. The ad was created by Berlin-based ad agency Antoni (the lead European agency for Mercedes-Benz), and directed by Sebastian Strasser via his production company, Anorak Film.

The Benz home has been designated as historic and is used as a scientific meeting facility for a nonprofit foundation, the Daimler and Benz Foundation, which aims to promote science and research in order to gain a better understanding of the correlation between man, the environment and technology.

== In popular culture ==
In 2011, a dramatized television movie about the life of Carl and Bertha Benz was made named Carl & Bertha, which premiered on 11 May and was aired by Das Erste on 23 May. A trailer of the movie and a "making of" special were released on YouTube.

== See also ==
- Louise Sarazin – French businesswoman who played a significant role in early automotive history
