= Hieracium pangoriense =

Conservation status
- Vulnerable (IUCN 3.1)

Scientific classification
- Kingdom: Plantae
- Clade: Tracheophytes
- Clade: Angiosperms
- Clade: Eudicots
- Clade: Asterids
- Order: Asterales
- Family: Asteraceae
- Genus: Hieracium
- Species: H. pangoriense

Binomial name
- Hieracium pangoriense Zahn

Species of flowering plant

Hieracium pangoriense is a species of flowering plant in the family Asteraceae that is endemic to Ecuador. Its natural habitat is subtropical or tropical moist montane forests. It is threatened by habitat loss.
