= Wiesloch =

- Town
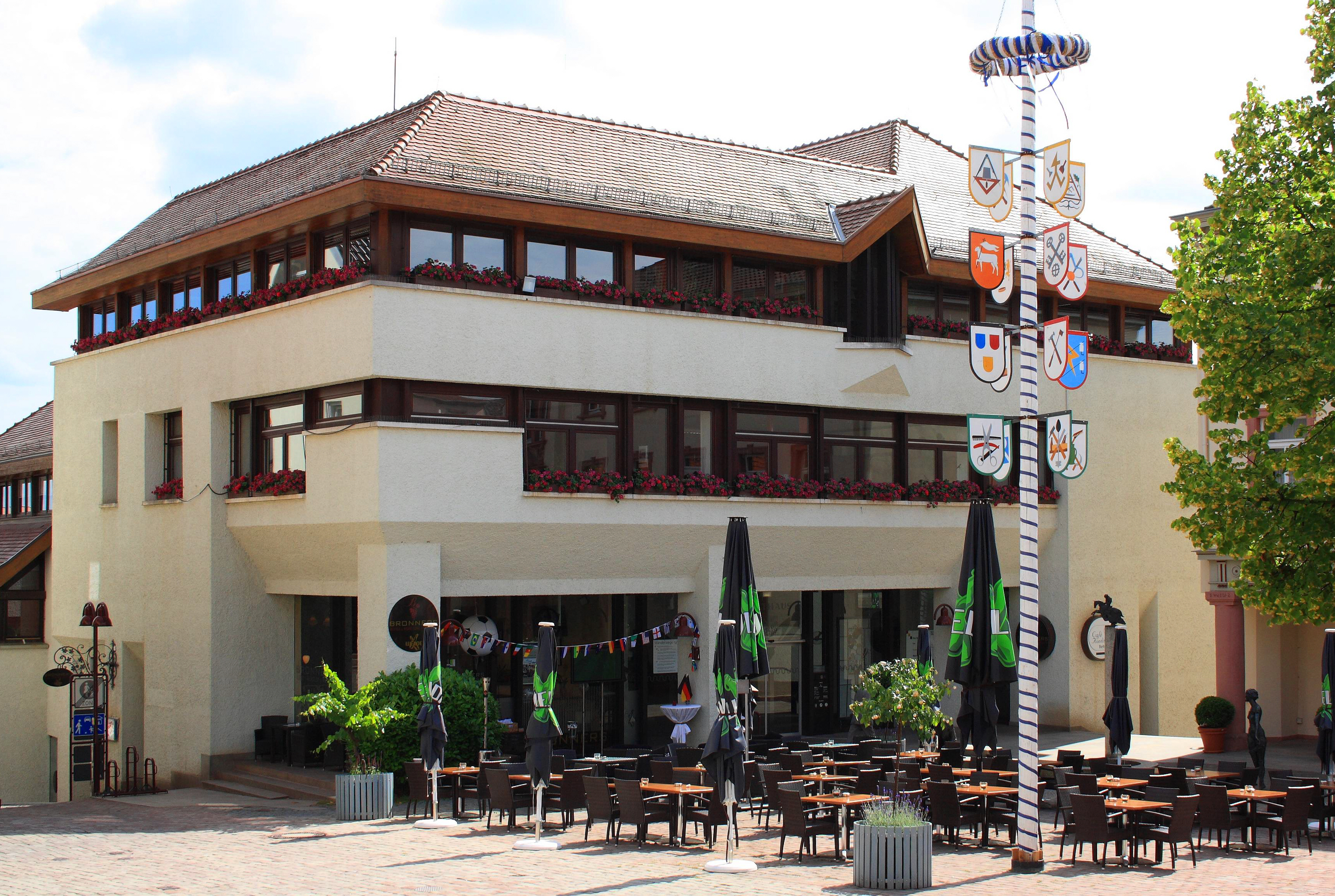
- Town hall

- Coat of arms

- Location of Wiesloch within Rhein-Neckar-Kreis district
- Interactive map of Wiesloch
- Location within Germany Location within Baden-Württemberg
- Coordinates: 49°17′39″N 08°41′54″E
- Country: Germany
- State: Baden-Württemberg
- Admin. region: Karlsruhe
- District: Rhein-Neckar-Kreis
- Subdivisions: Kernstadt, 4 Stadtteile

Government
  - Mayor (2023–31): Dirk Elkemann (Ind.)

Area
  - Total: 30.24 km^{2} (11.68 sq mi)
- Elevation: 130 m (430 ft)

Population (2025-12-31)
  - Total: 27,911
  - Density: 923.0/km^{2} (2,391/sq mi)
- Time zone: UTC+01:00 (CET)
  - Summer (DST): UTC+02:00 (CEST)
- Postal codes: 69168
- Dialling codes: 06222
- Vehicle registration: HD
- Website: www.wiesloch.de

Wiesloch (German: [ˈviːslɔx], locally [ˈvɪslɔx]; South Franconian: Wissloch) is a town in northern Baden-Württemberg, Germany. It is situated 13 kilometres south of Heidelberg. After Weinheim and Sinsheim, it is the third largest town in the Rhein-Neckar-Kreis. It shares Wiesloch-Walldorf station with its neighbouring town Walldorf. Also in the vicinity of Wiesloch are Dielheim, Malsch (bei Wiesloch), Mühlhausen, Rauenberg and Sankt Leon-Rot.

Wiesloch's population grew to more than 20,000 when the administration of the area was reorganised in the 1970s. Wiesloch became a Große Kreisstadt on 1 January 1973, when Altwiesloch, Baiertal, Frauenweiler and Schatthausen were amalgamated with Wiesloch to form the present municipality.

== History ==
The settlement that is now Wiesloch town centre originated during the expansion of silver mining in the vicinity in the 10th century.

=== Fossil site ===
The fossil remains of the oldest hummingbird found to date, Eurotrochilus inexpectatus, were found in a clay pit at Frauenweiler. This bird lived during the Early Oligocene (30 mya), when the area had a humid, subtropical climate similar to the northern Caribbean today.

=== Emperor Henry IV ===
In 1077, Emperor Henry IV locked more than 100 of his enemies in the early church at Wizinloch (as the place was then known) on the site of the present Protestant church (Stadtkirche) and burnt the building down. (There is no historical evidence that HRE Henry IV did this. It's either hearsay, or a story conflated with acts perpetrated by other rulers.)

=== Battles ===
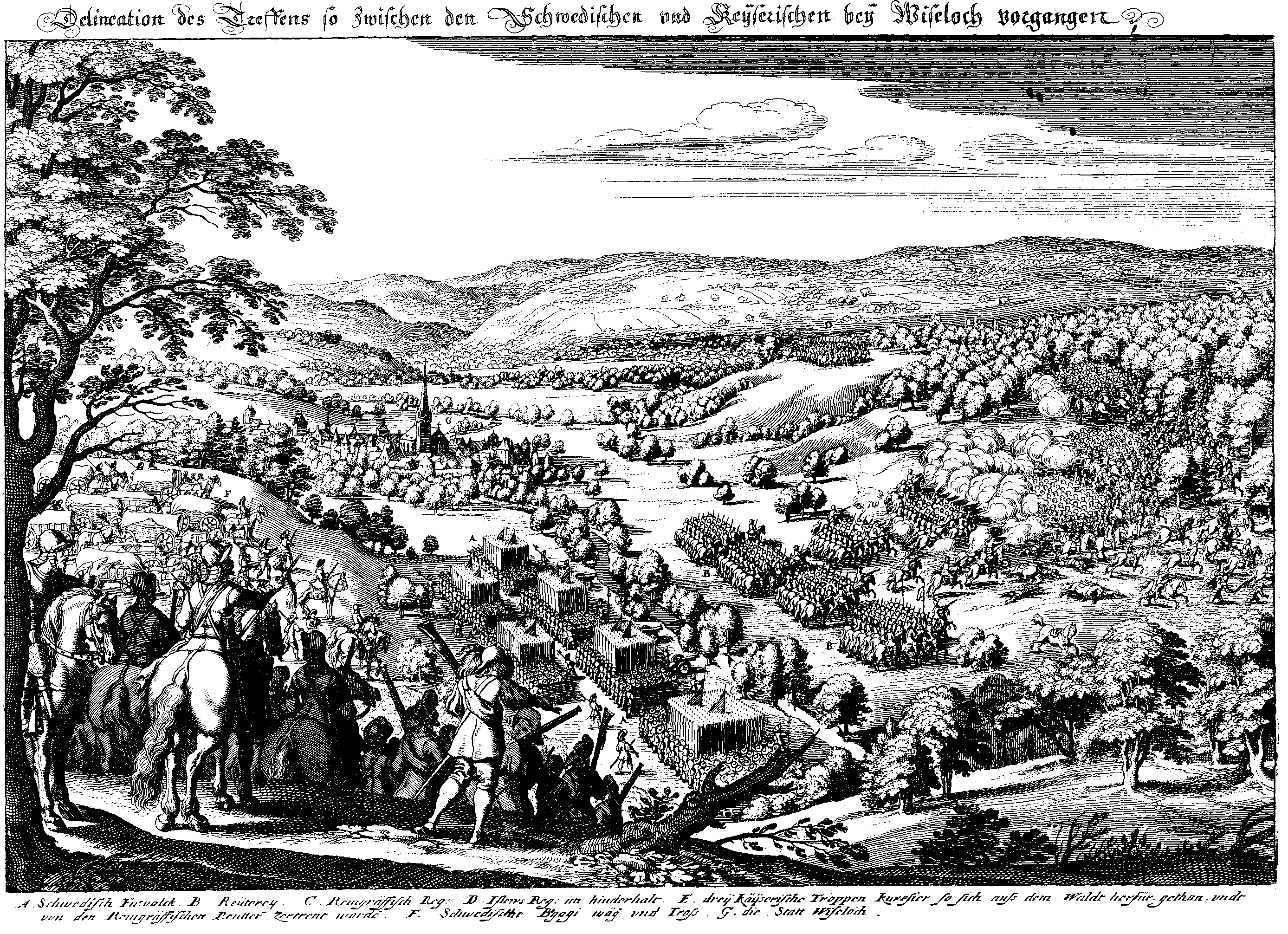
Battle of Wiesloch (1632)

There were three battles near Wiesloch, the Battle of Mingolsheim on 27 April 1622 (during the Thirty Years' War), the 1632 Battle of Wiesloch on 16 August 1632, (during the same war) and the 1799 Battle of Wiesloch on 3 December 1799 (during the War of the Second Coalition).

Wiesloch was attacked on 28 January 1689 by French troops under Ezéchiel du Mas, Comte de Mélac, during the Nine Years' War, and was almost completely burnt down and destroyed.

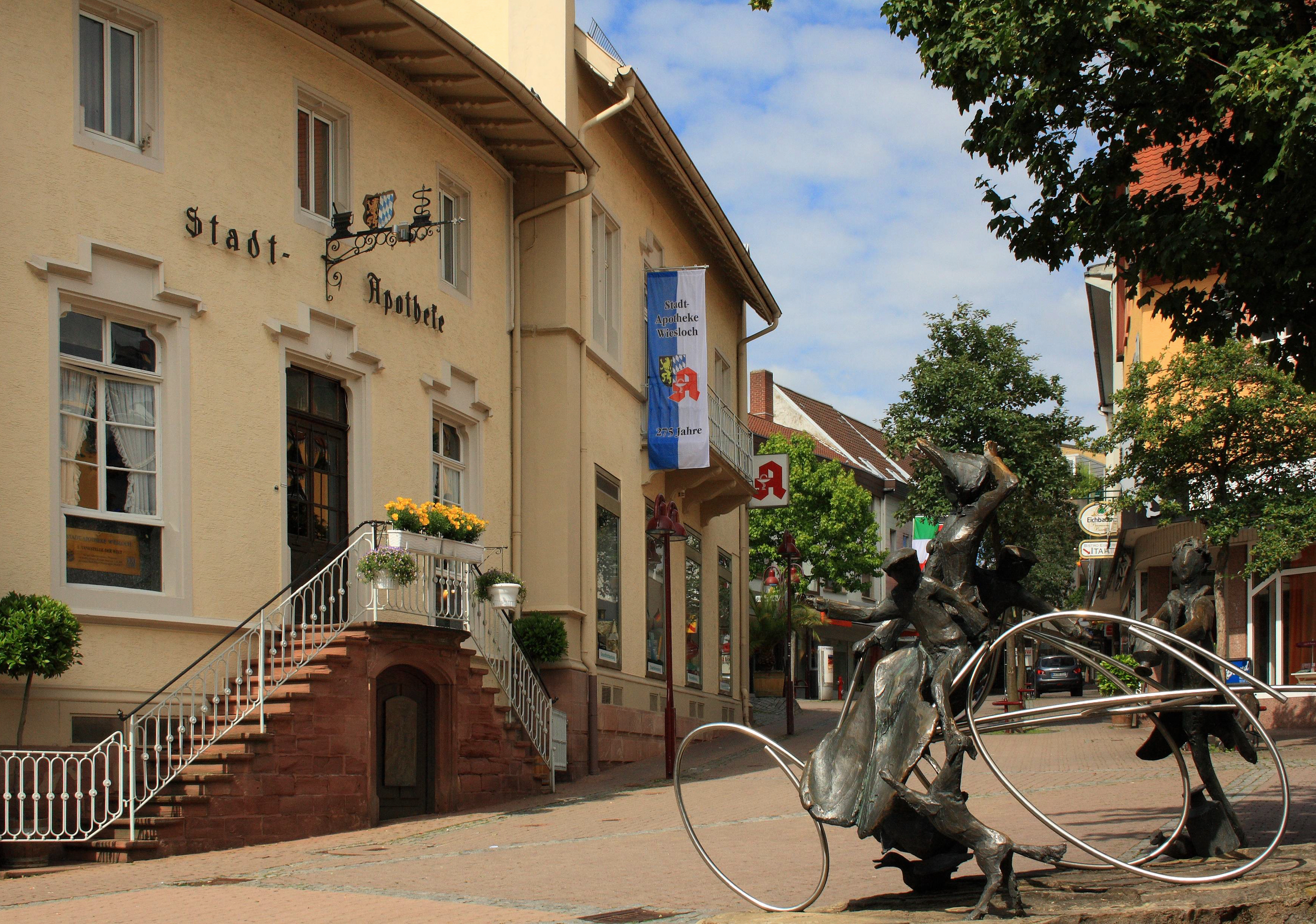
First "filling station" in the world

=== Bertha Benz ===
The city pharmacy in Wiesloch was the first "filling station" in the world, because Bertha Benz stopped there on 5 August 1888, on the first long distance car trip, to refill the tank of her automobile, which her husband Karl Benz had invented. She was supplied with ligroin by the apothecary Willi Ockel.

In 2008, the Bertha Benz Memorial Route was officially designated an industrial heritage route, following Bertha Benz's route on the world's first long-distance journey by automobile. It is a 194 km signposted circuit from Mannheim via Heidelberg and Wiesloch to Pforzheim in the Black Forest, and back.

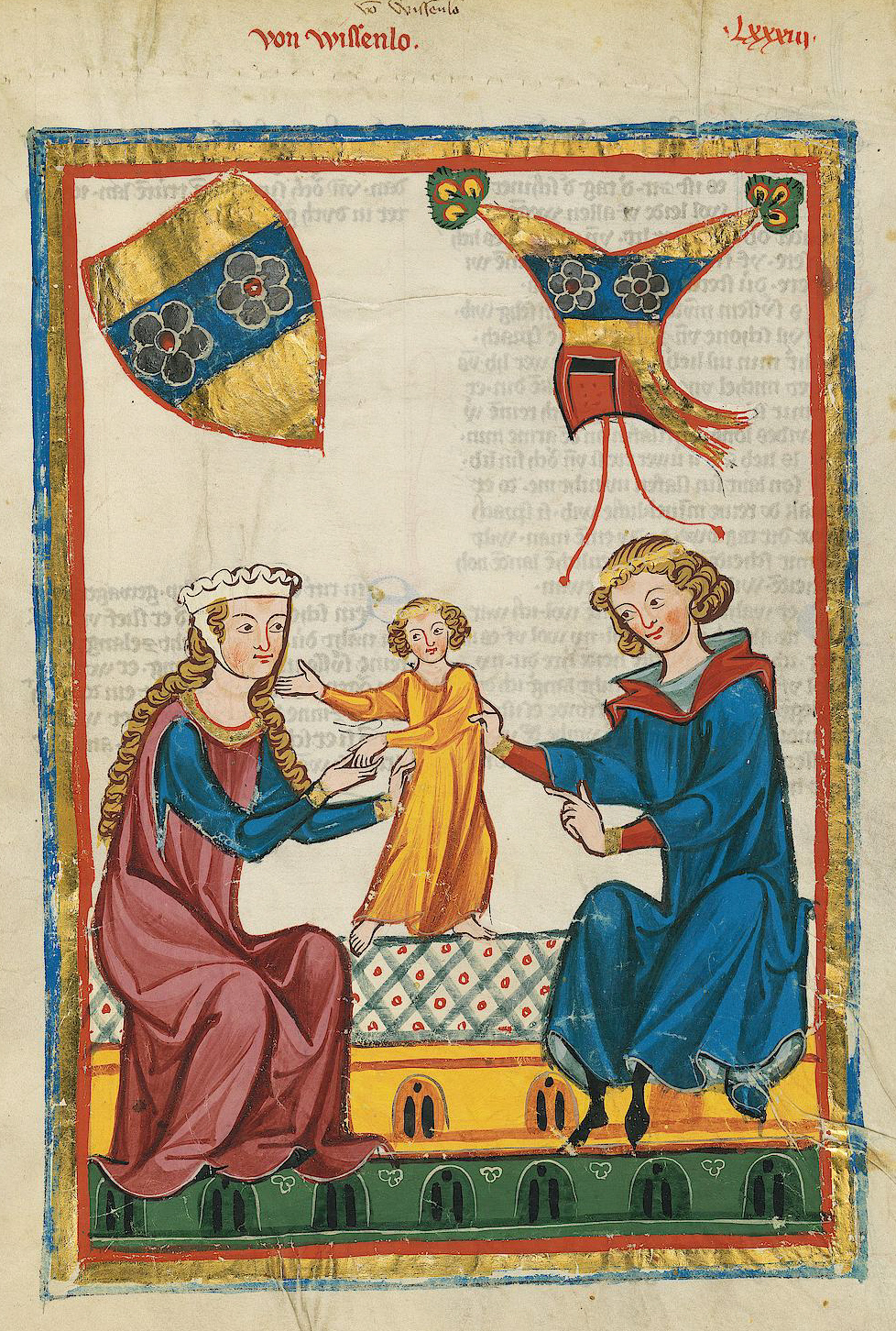
The Minnesinger von Wissenlo, from the Codex Manesse

=== The Minnesinger von Wissenlo ===
The Codex Manesse includes four sophisticated Middle High German lyrics in the tagelied genre ascribed to the Minnesinger von Wissenlo (meaning "minnesang poet from Wiesloch"). The identity of the Minnesinger von Wissenlo is not known, but the poet is conjectured to be Heinrich Swendinger von Wissenloch, who lived in the second half of the 13th century. An illustration titled von Wissenlo in the Codex Manesse shows a lady, a child, and a knight, and includes an escutcheon which does not match that of the Von Wissenloch family.

There are two statues of the Minnesinger von Wissenlo in Wiesloch town centre: one, by Hatto Zeidler from 1978, is in the square by the united Protestant church (Stadtkirche) and shows the poet playing the lyre; the other, an equestrian statue on a tall column, is part of a group by Karel Fron that was erected in the market square near the town hall in 1988.

== Geography ==
Wiesloch is situated partly on the southern foothills of the Odenwald, partly in the Rhine Valley, and partly in the Kraichgau. Five brooks flow through Wiesloch: the Leimbach, the Gauangelbach, the Waldangelbach, the Ochsenbach, and the Maisbach.

== Economy ==
MLP AG, a large German broker of personal finance services, is headquartered at Wiesloch. Wiesloch also hosts the world's largest printing press manufacturing site, operated by Heidelberger Druckmaschinen. Other large companies in the close vicinity are HeidelbergCement, the central cool store warehouses for the REWE Group supermarket chain, and the global headquarters of SAP SE.

"MetropolPark Wiesloch-Walldorf" is the brand name for the commercial and industrial business park surrounding Wiesloch-Walldorf railway station.

== Leisure ==
The open-air Leimbach Park and Wiesloch Feldbahn and Industrial Museum are in the region surrounding the joint railway station.

== Twin towns – sister cities ==
Wiesloch is twinned with:

- Amarante, Portugal
- Fontenay-aux-Roses, France
- Sturgis, United States
- Ząbkowice Śląskie, Poland

== Notable people ==
- Karl Hermann Zahn (1865–1940), botanist, studied hawkweed
- Werner Zahn (1890–1971), bobsledder
- Erich Schelling (1904–1986), architect, worked in Karlsruhe
- Rudolf Wild (1904–1995), businessman, founded WILD, a food company
- Alfred Schön (born 1962), football manager and former player who played over 330 games.
- Klaus Weese (born 1967), freestyle skier
