= Franz Bock =

Franz Bock may refer to:

- Franz Bock (art historian)
- Franz Bock (bobsleigh)
- Franz Bock (SA-Obergruppenführer)
