= Klaus Weese =

German freestyle skier

Personal information
- Nationality: German
- Born: 20 November 1967 (age 57); Wiesloch, West Germany

Sport
- Sport: Freestyle skiing

Klaus Weese (born 20 November 1967) is a German former freestyle skier. He competed at the 1992 Winter Olympics and the 1994 Winter Olympics.
