= Ulli Kampelmann =

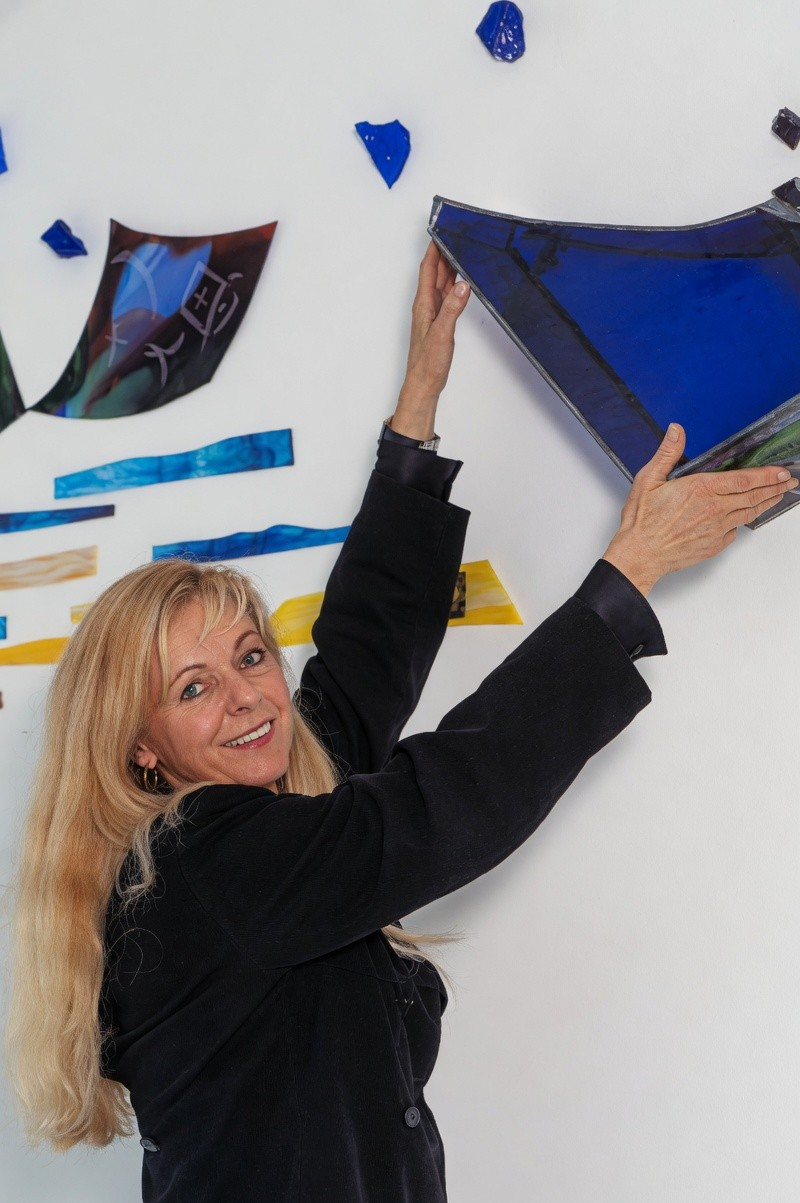
- Ulli Kampelmann installing a commissioned architectural glass relief at the Sommer family indoor swimming pool in Stuttgart, Germany.
- Born: Halle, Saxony-Anhalt, East Germany
- Citizenship: Germany; United States (since 2015)
- Education: Institut für Lehrerbildung Halle (Master of Education); Fachbereich Design, Fachhochschule Münster; Institut für Naturheilkunde, Münster
- Occupation: Artist
- Known for: Architectural glass, Public art, Painting
- Spouse: Steve (m. 2002)
- Children: 1
- Website: www.ullikampelmann.com

Ulli Kampelmann is a German-American artist, author, and educator based in Utah. She is known for architecturally integrated glass installations, public art commissions, painting, educational publications, and documentary filmmaking.

Born and raised in East Germany, Kampelmann escaped on three occasions to West Berlin between 1959 and 1976 before settling in West Germany. She established her art studio in Stuttgart in 1981, where she developed a practice centered on sculpture, architectural glass, and site-specific public art. During the 1990s and early 2000s she completed numerous permanent commissions for public institutions and corporate clients in Germany.

Her works are held in institutional and private collections, including the Mercedes-Benz Art Collection, the collection of Hans-Dietrich Genscher, and the library of U.S. Ambassador Max Kampelman.

Since relocating to the United States in 2002, Kampelmann has continued her artistic practice while expanding her work as an author.

== Early life ==
Ulli Kampelmann was born in Halle (Saale), East Germany, and spent her childhood there during the early years of the German Democratic Republic.

== Escapes from East Germany ==
=== First escape (1959) ===
When Kampelmann was seven years old, her family obtained permission to travel to West Berlin for a short visit, but intended to remain in West Germany. Her mother traveled to West Berlin by train with Kampelmann and her two brothers, while her father and sister traveled separately. Before reaching West Berlin, her father and sister were arrested on the train by East German authorities. After waiting unsuccessfully for them to arrive, Kampelmann's mother returned with the children to Halle.

Kampelmann's father was convicted of organizing the family's attempted escape from East Germany and sentenced to two years and three months imprisonment, while Elsa Kampelmann received a suspended ten-month sentence. Her mother received probation because she had four children. The family's travel permit was revoked and their savings were confiscated. Wilhelm Kampelmann was released under an amnesty on 17 November 1960 after serving approximately sixteen months.

=== Second escape (1975) ===
In 1973, Kampelmann was working as a teacher in Halle. According to her Stasi file, she came under surveillance during this period after repeatedly departing from the prescribed political curriculum in her classroom. In April 1975 she met a West Berlin citizen visiting Halle. The two developed a friendship, and several months later he offered to help her escape East Germany. On 10 August 1975, Kampelmann concealed herself in the luggage compartment of his Renault 4, and he then drove to the East German border crossing to West Berlin at Checkpoint Bravo (Dreilinden) and passed through without incident.

Because West Berlin citizens were subject to abbreviated border inspections under the Four Power Agreement on Berlin, the vehicle received only a cursory inspection, allowing her to reach West Berlin.

Kampelmann's 1975 escape is documented in her Stasi surveillance file, obtained from the Stasi Records Agency. The file records her successful escape but notes that investigators were unable to determine how she had crossed the border. Her presence in West Berlin following her escape is documented by a Category C identity document (Ausweis für Vertriebene und Flüchtlinge C) issued by the Berlin Senator for Labor and Social Affairs on 4 November 1975.

=== Third escape (1976) ===
After settling in West Berlin, Kampelmann worked as a teacher. Wishing to visit her family in East Germany, Kampelmann borrowed the passport of a West Berlin actress whose appearance closely resembled her own. On Weihnachten (24 December) 1976, Kampelmann used the passport to enter East Berlin, where she spent the day with her family, before returning to West Berlin later that evening without being detected. According to accounts from both the actress and the West Berlin resident who accompanied her, Kampelmann resembled the actress closely enough that the passport photo was not questioned at the checkpoint. The visit is documented by contemporaneous family photographs and later interviews with both the West Berlin resident who accompanied her and the actress who lent her passport. As well, Kampelmann's third escape is also referenced in her Stasi file, which records an unauthorized crossing into East Berlin and returning to West Berlin on 24 December 1976.

== Education ==
In 1973, Kampelmann earned a Master of Education from the Institut für Lehrerbildung Halle (Institute for Teacher Training, Halle), specializing in art and German language instruction. Her studies also introduced her to reform-oriented educational methods, an interest she later developed through educational books and publications.

Following her move to Münster, West Germany in 1977, Kampelmann studied sculpture and graphic design at the Fachbereich Design, Fachhochschule Münster (Department of Design, Münster University of Applied Sciences) while simultaneously completing a four-year part-time course in natural medicine at the Institut für Naturheilkunde, Münster & Stuttgart (Institute for natural Medicine, Münster & Stuttgart).

== Career ==
Kampelmann established her art studio in Stuttgart in 1981. Beginning with sculpture and reliefs, she grew her practice creating fountains and sculptural works over the next few years.

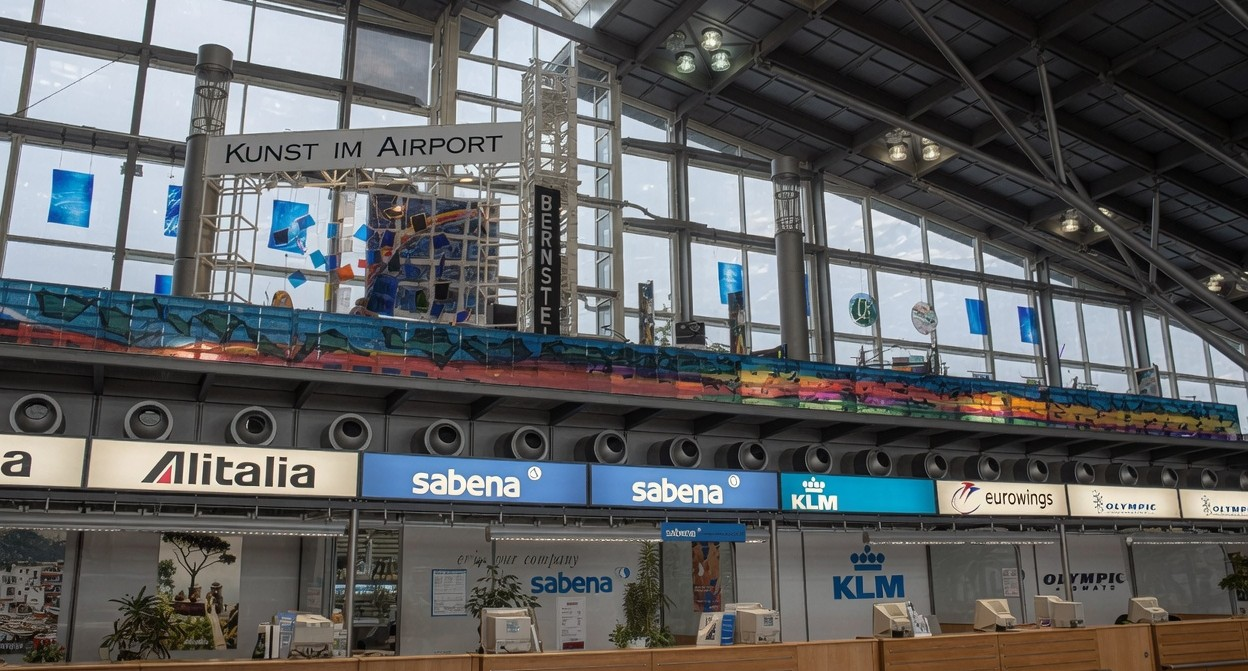
Solo exhibition by Ulli Kampelmann on the mezzanine level of Stuttgart Airport, Germany, held from 15 August to 15 October 1997.

Throughout her career, Kampelmann has worked across painting, sculpture, architectural glass, design, film, and writing, often combining these disciplines within a single body of work.

During the 1980s Kampelmann increasingly adopted glass into her sculptures and it eventually became her principal artistic medium. In 1993 she introduced her Light Sculptures, a series of internally illuminated, triangular, leaded-glass columns that marked the beginning of her exploration of light as an architectural element.

In 1994 she completed her first large-scale architectural glass commission: a 62-square-metre-long (670 ft^{2}) skylight for Carl, Duke of Württemberg's new Golf Clubhouse at Domäne Niederreutin in Bondorf. This commission was followed by numerous permanent public and corporate installations throughout Germany, including over 400 square metres (4,300 sq ft) of painted and sandblasted architectural glass installations for the historic Art Nouveau thermal baths in Karlsruhe.

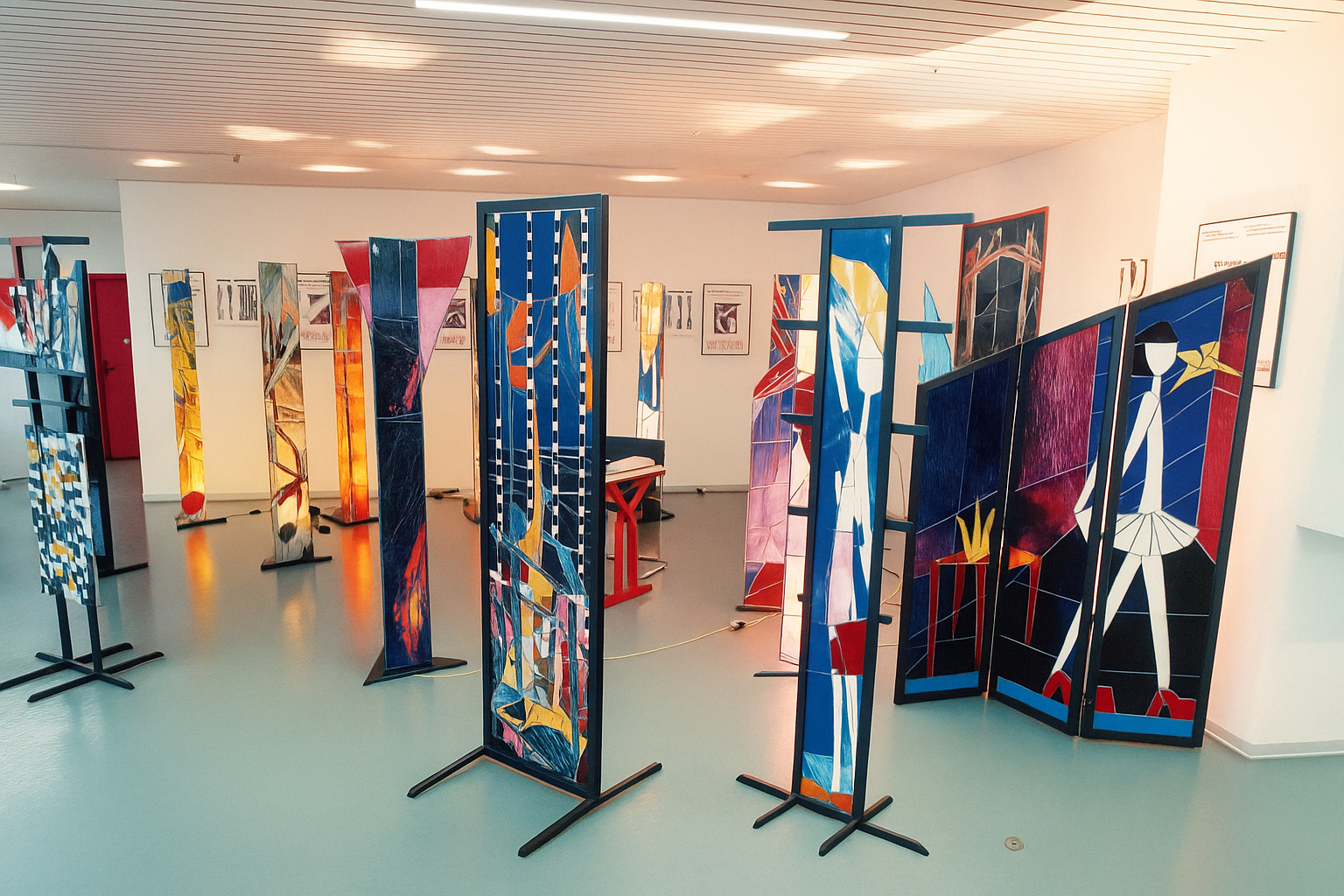
Exhibition of light sculptures, stelae, and paravents by Ulli Kampelmann at the Söllingen Conference Center, Germany, 1996.

Additional commissions included a painted and sandblasted architectural glass installation for the restaurant of the Fernsehturm Berlin (Berlin TV Tower) at Alexanderplatz, as well as four large-scale artworks for the headquarters of Corporate Express Deutschland GmbH in Stuttgart.

Her 1995 glass installation for the Fernsehturm restaurant is briefly visible in the feature film Zimmerspringbrunnen (2001).

In 1995, Kampelmann began adapting her Light Sculptures into three-paneled architectural glass folding screens, which she called paravents. She conceived them as scaled architectural models that demonstrated how colored glass could function as an integral element of contemporary architecture, rather than solely as a medium for ecclesiastical windows.

In 1996, she adopted the professional name Ulli Bernstein. In 2005, she resumed using Kampelmann, her birth name.

In 1997 Kampelmann held a solo exhibition at Stuttgart International Airport from 15 August to 15 October. On the opening day of the exhibition, Silke Köhler reported in the Stuttgarter Zeitung that Max Rossner of the Bund Deutscher Künstler Baden-Württemberg said Kampelmann had “secured a firm place within the contemporary art scene and has enriched art in architecture with new ideas.” The exhibition led to contact with executives of Daimler-Benz AG, which led to several architectural glass commissions for the company.

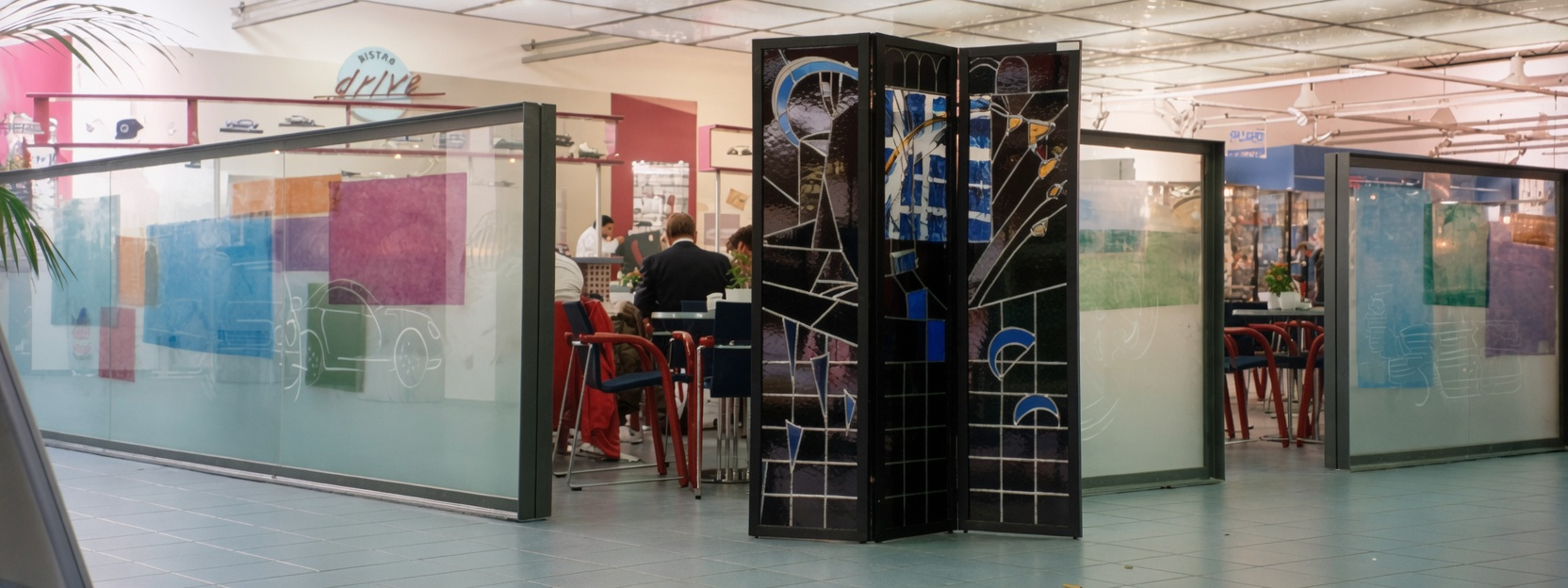
Architectural glass partition designed by Ulli Kampelmann for the Mercedes-Benz showroom bistro; the matching glass paravent commissioned for the Mercedes-Benz VIP lounge is shown in the foreground during the showroom opening exhibition.

In 1997-1998, Kampelmann held two solo exhibitions at the Mercedes-Benz showroom in central Stuttgart, one lasting one month and the other three months. Over the next few years, she completed several architectural glass and public art commissions for the company.

While researching the Mercedes-Benz archives for one of these commissions, she examined historical material relating to Carl Benz, inventor of the automobile, and his wife Bertha Benz. Kampelmann later drew on this research for published articles, educational presentations, and the award-winning documentary The Car Is Born, which she co-produced with her husband. She also produced a 53 minute educational video recounting Bertha Benz's historic journey with her sons, Eugen and Richard.

Kampelmann relocated to Clearwater, Florida, in 2002, where she continued her work in architectural glass and public art.

In 2003, she was approved as a provider of continuing education courses for architects and interior designers in Florida and presented educational programs for professional architectural organizations.

In early 2006, working with her husband Steve, Kampelmann developed architectural glass panels incorporating laminated LED lighting. Together they founded LEDs in Glass, promoting the integration of illuminated glass into architectural projects. The company and its technology were featured in Blaine Brownell's Transmaterial 2: A Catalog of Materials That Redefine Our Physical Environment.

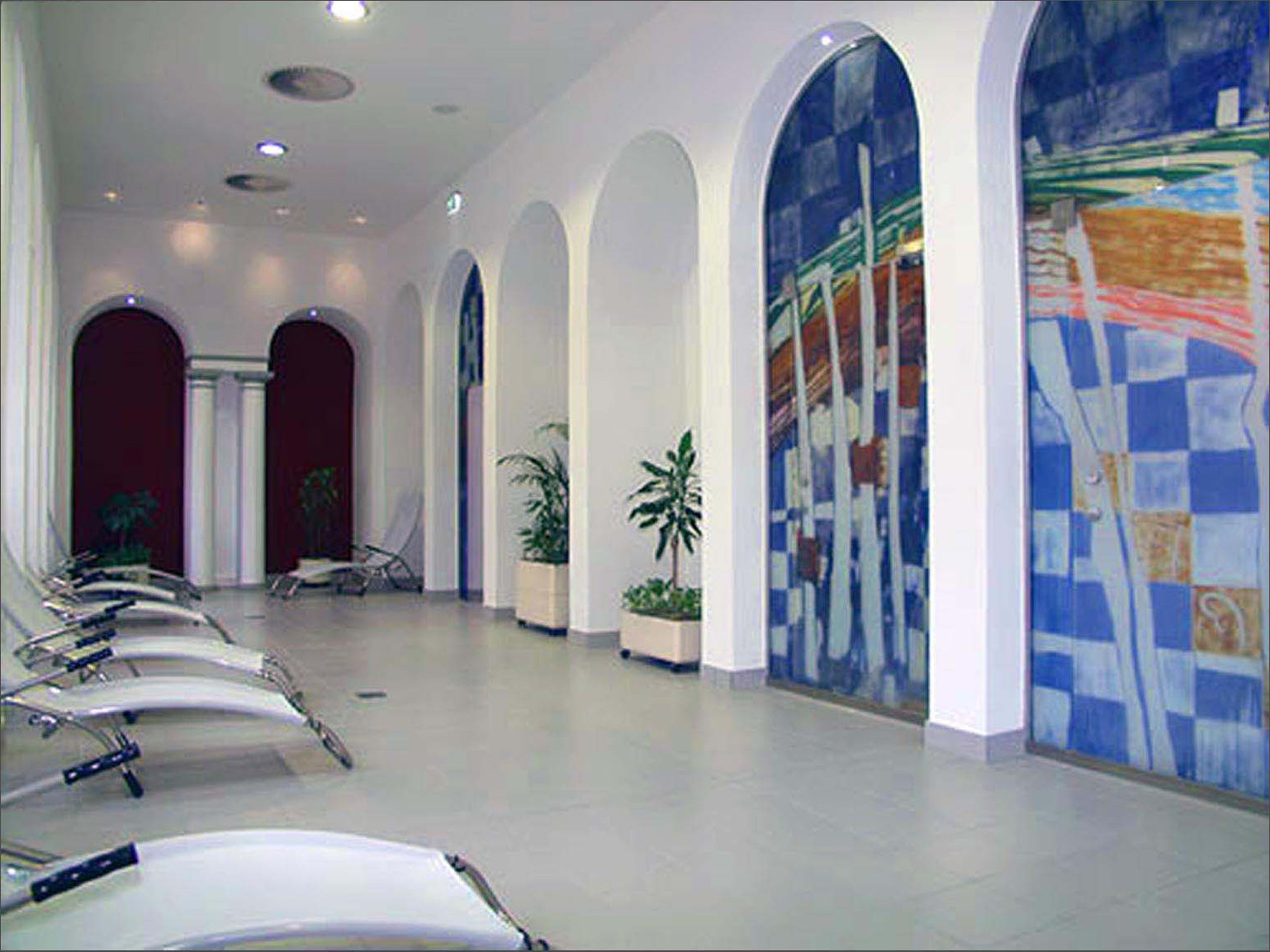
Part of Kampelmann's 400 m² (4,300 sq ft) architectural glass installation at the Vierordtbad spa, Karlsruhe, Germany.

In December 2006, Kampelmann became the first artist selected for the City of Clearwater's newly established Public Art & Design Program. Her architectural glass installation was the program's inaugural temporary public artwork, and she presented a public lecture at the Municipal Services Building on the role of architectural glass in public art. That same year, she participated in an international exhibition in Abu Dhabi, United Arab Emirates.

Between 2008 and 2012, Kampelmann explored sculpture on a miniature scale through the design of sculptural wristwatches, incorporating precious metals and gemstones. Rather than treating the watches as conventional jewelry, she conceived the timepieces as miniature sculptures to be worn, applying the same interest in form, color, light, and architectural composition that characterized her larger works in glass and sculpture. The collection received coverage in regional publications, including Tampa Bay Metro.

In 2010, Kampelmann and her husband coordinated the fabrication of a large illuminated glass chandelier for Kuwait Business Town in Kuwait City. Commissioned by KEO International Consultants, the installation measured approximately 20 metres (66 ft) in length, incorporated more than 22,000 blue LEDs laminated within 200 suspended glass panels, and weighed approximately eleven tons.

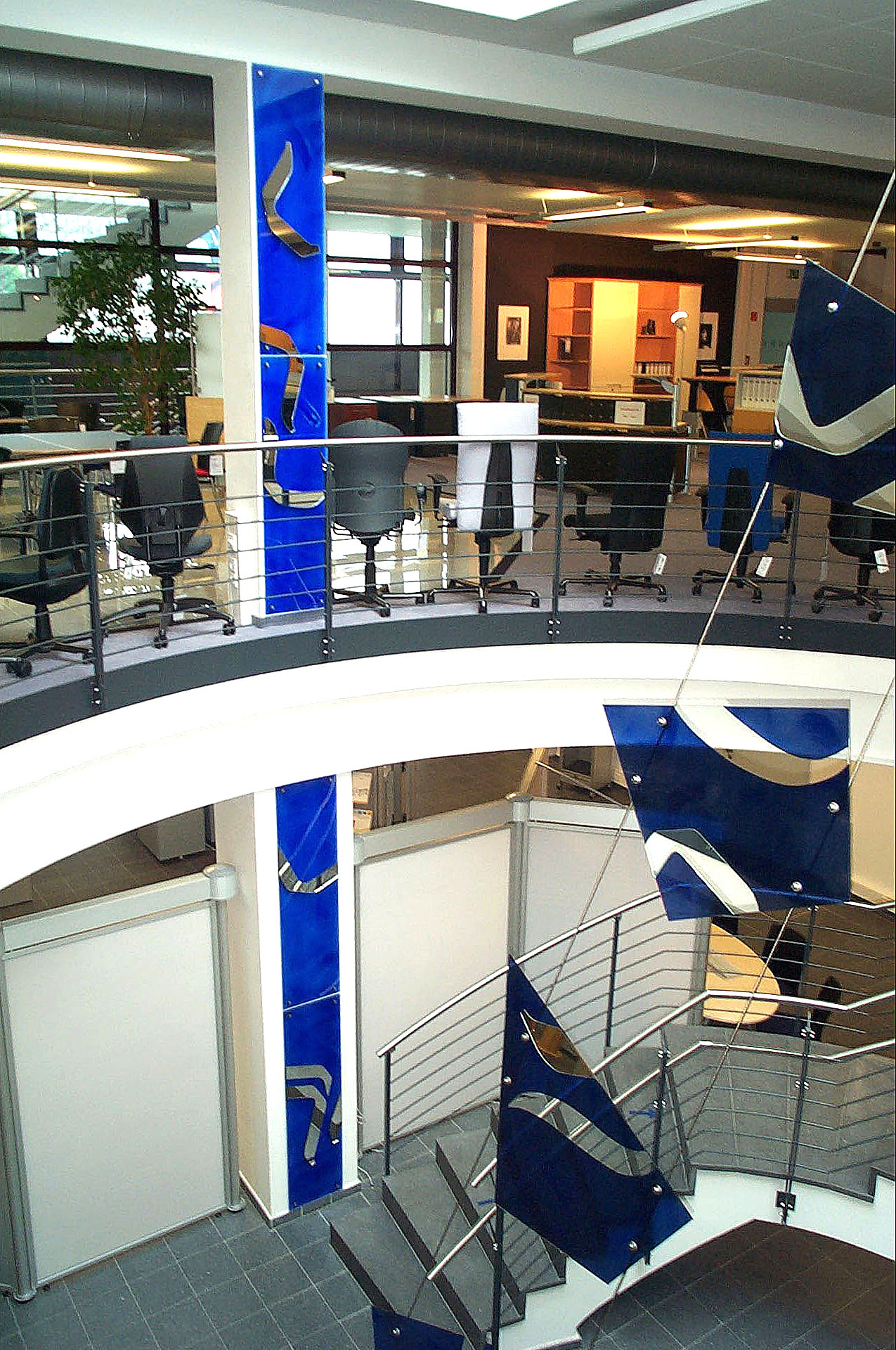
Architectural glass installation at the Corporate Express headquarters in Stuttgart, designed by Ulli Kampelmann.

Painting and sculpture have remained central to Kampelmann's artistic practice throughout her career, alongside her work in architectural glass and public art. In 2012 she began the vertical-format Thresholds series, which she has described as reflecting the fragmentary nature of memory. Since then, Kampelmann has continued to develop her painting practice, producing mixed-media and gestural abstract works that explore themes of light, memory, and landscape. Her paintings have been exhibited in solo exhibitions and are held in private collections in Europe and the United States.

== Artistic style ==
Kampelmann has described her childhood in Halle as formative to her artistic development, citing her father's metalsmithing workshop and her mother's embroidery and dressmaking as early influences on her approach to craft, material, and aesthetic balance.

Kampelmann used glass as a medium in which natural and artificial light played a central role. According to a 1997 review in the Stuttgarter Zeitung, her architectural glass installations used color, transparency, and light to interact with interior spaces. Light has been a recurring element in her work across painting, sculpture, and architectural glass.

Her work across painting, sculpture, and architectural glass frequently incorporates light, transparency, and movement. Kampelmann has stated that she aims to create works that communicate beauty and human connection.

Dipl.-Ing Klaus H. Schmöller, director of the Stuttgart Chamber of Architects, described Kampelmann's work as combining glass with music and art with architecture, praising what he called her "experimental spirit and passion."

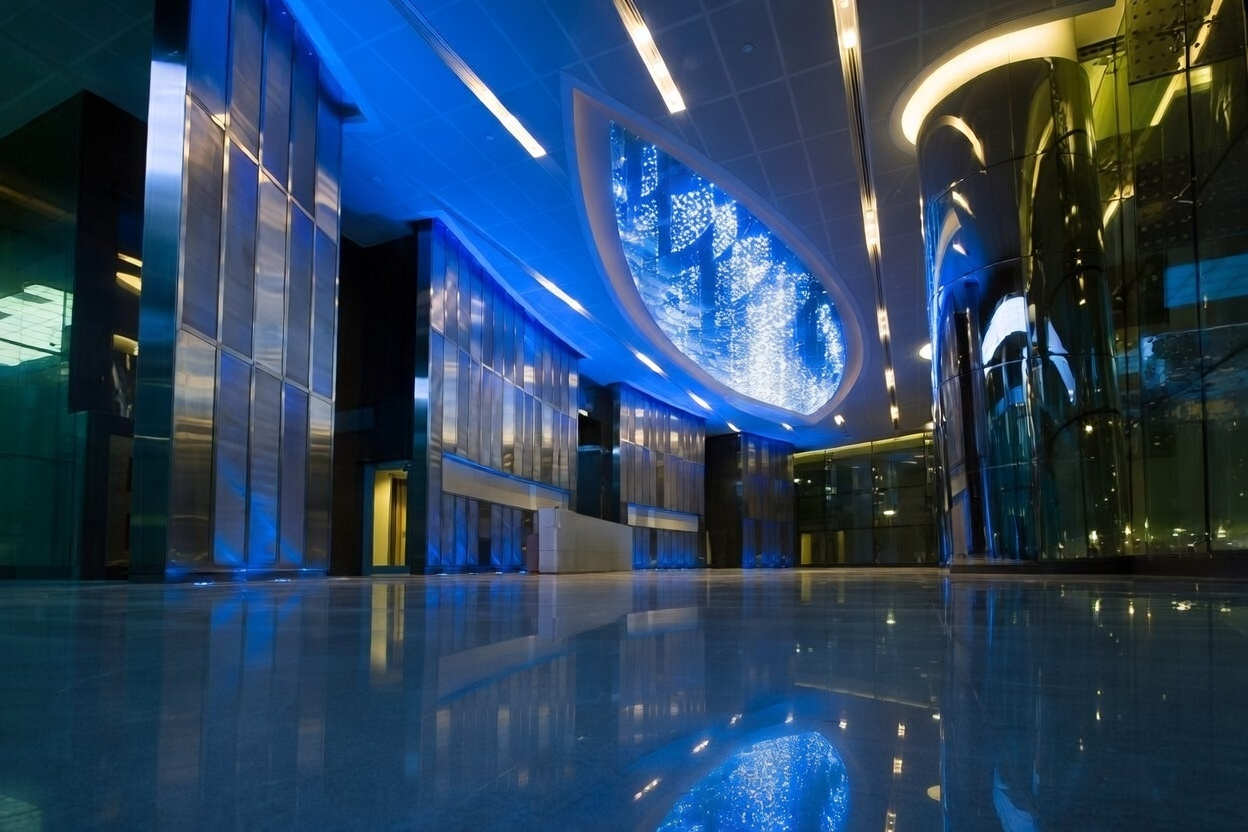
Chandelier incorporating LED glass panels by Ulli Kampelmann for the lobby of Tower 5, Kuwait Business Town, Kuwait City, as part of a collaboration with KEO International Consultants.

== Writing ==
Kampelmann has written on subjects including contemporary art, architectural glass, automotive history, and education.

In 2002 she wrote a continuing education course for architects called The History of Glass in Architecture. As a result Kampelmann was registered as a provider through the Florida Department of Business and Professional Regulation.

In 2003 she authored The Complete Visual Arts Education, a comprehensive K–12 visual arts curriculum consisting of weekly lesson plans, which was developed for use in private schools.

In 2005 through 2006, Kampelmann contributed a monthly column, "Ulli on Art," to the Tampa Bay lifestyle magazine Imago, writing about contemporary art, creativity, and architectural glass.

In 2012, based on research undertaken during her Mercedes-Benz commissions in Stuttgart, Kampelmann published "A Firm Hand on the Tiller – The Road Trip of Bertha Benz", an article on Bertha Benz's 1888 journey, in The Star, the magazine of the Mercedes-Benz Club of America.

Photomontage of Threshold of Inner Sound (2024), illustrating the scale of Ulli Kampelmann's vertical-format painting in an architectural setting.

Beginning in 2015, Kampelmann published a series of newsletters called Education Reformer advocating educational reform through Kampelmann Academy.

Her later publications focus on educational philosophy. In 2023 she published Passing on Knowledge: The Lost Technologies of Successful Teaching, examining the work of influential reform educators. In 2025 she published Visionary Education: The Solution, presenting proposals for educational methodology and school design.

== Film and screenwriting ==
In 2011, Kampelmann wrote, directed, and co-produced The Car Is Born: A Documentary About Carl & Bertha Benz, examining the invention of the automobile and the pioneering achievements of Carl and Bertha Benz. During production, Kampelmann interviewed Jutta Benz, great-granddaughter of Carl and Bertha Benz, at the Automuseum Dr. Carl Benz, housed in the former Benz factory in Ladenburg. The film grew out of archival research she conducted while completing commissions for Mercedes-Benz. It received an Official Best of Fest Award. The same year, she and her husband Steve wrote and co-produced That Damned Wall, a documentary examining everyday life in East Germany and Kampelmann's escapes from the country. During production, Kampelmann conducted original interviews with former German Vice-Chancellor Hans-Dietrich Genscher and U.S. Ambassador Max M. Kampelman concerning their roles in improving conditions for East Germans and the eventual fall of the Berlin Wall.

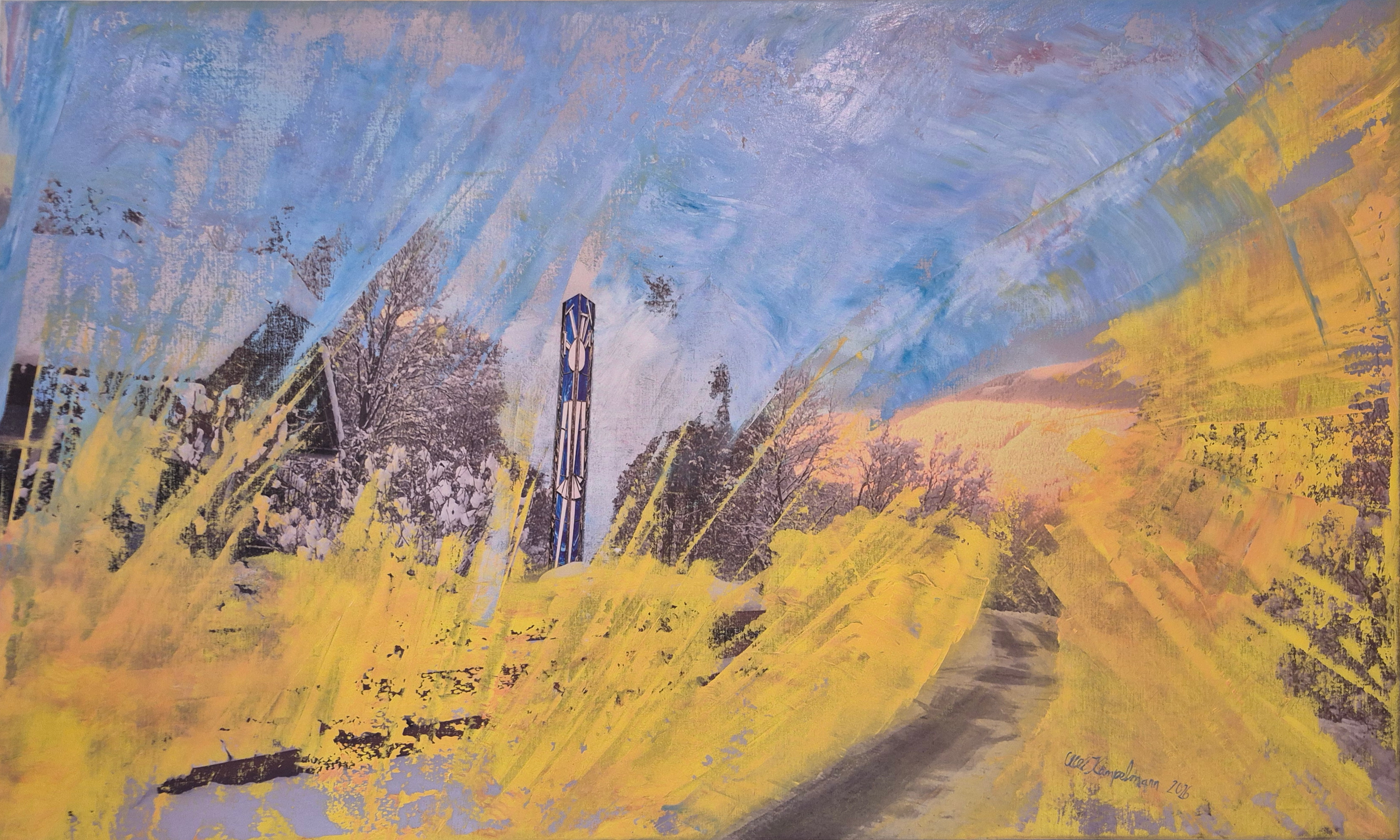
Embrace of Light, mixed-media painting by Ulli Kampelmann (2026), integrating the artist's architectural light sculpture Antennen Frau into a contemporary landscape composition.

== Collections ==
Works by Kampelmann are held in the collections of:

- Achim Freyer Kunsthaus, Berlin
- Hans-Dietrich Genscher, former Vice-Chancellor of Germany
- Max M. Kampelman library
- Mercedes-Benz Art Collection, Stuttgart
- Paul Eberhard Schwenk Collection, Schloss Haigerloch
- Trish Duggan, founder of the Imagine Museum, St. Petersburg, Florida

== Selected permanent public commissions ==
Year	Location	Artwork	Description
1994	Golf Club Domäne Niederreutin, Bondorf	Skylight	Architectural glass skylight, 62 square metres (670 sq ft), installed in the newly built clubhouse.
1994	Schloss Liebenstein, Neckarwestheim	Architectural glass entryway	Painted and sandblasted architectural glass installation, 8 square metres (86 sq ft).
1995	Restaurant, Fernsehturm Berlin (Berlin TV Tower)	Architectural glass doors	Painted and sandblasted architectural glass installation, 18 square metres (190 sq ft).
1996	Vierordtbad Public Baths, Karlsruhe	Glass doors, windows, walls	Painted and sandblasted architectural glass, over 400 square metres (4,300 sq ft).
1996	Sparkasse Karlsruhe, Marktplatz customer hall	Architectural glass wall	Painted and sandblasted architectural glass installation, 40 square metres (430 sq ft).
1997	Mercedes-Benz showroom, Stuttgart	Glass partition	Painted and sandblasted architectural glass partition, 16 square metres (170 sq ft).
1997	Klinik Tannheim	Architectural glass wall	Painted and sandblasted architectural glass installation, 24 square metres (260 sq ft).
2000	Corporate Express Headquarters, Stuttgart	Architectural glass installations	Four painted and sandblasted glass and mirror installations totaling 16 square metres (170 sq ft).
2010	Kuwait Business Town, Kuwait City	Illuminated chandelier	Boat-shaped glass chandelier, approximately 20-metre-long (66 ft) with about 22,000 LEDs installed in the lobby of Tower Five.

== Solo and selected exhibitions ==
Year	Venue	City	Exhibition
1986	Leuze Mineral Baths	Stuttgart	Water sculptures and reliefs (solo exhibition).
1989	Leuze Mineral Baths	Stuttgart	Water sculptures and reliefs (solo exhibition).
1990	Leuze Mineral Baths	Stuttgart	Water sculptures and reliefs (solo exhibition).
1993	Classic Congress Art Hotel	Stuttgart	Light Sculptures.
1993	Hotel Intercontinental	Stuttgart	Light Sculptures.
1993	Galerie am Haagtor	Tübingen	Light Sculptures.
1995	Liederhalle Culture and Congress Center	Stuttgart	Leaded-glass paravents.
1995	Schloss Hohenheim	Stuttgart	Light Sculptures and leaded-glass paravents; presentation to the Association of Architects of Baden-Württemberg.
1997	Stuttgart International Airport	Stuttgart	Solo exhibition of stelae, Light Sculptures, glass paravents, glass paintings, and a glass house.
1998	Mercedes-Benz Group Headquarters	Stuttgart	Bistro opening exhibition featuring Light Sculptures, leaded-glass paravents, and glass paintings.
1998	Mercedes-Benz Group Headquarters	Stuttgart	Exhibition and presentation during a joint DaimlerChrysler AG / Stuttgart 21 event, including slide presentation, Light Sculptures, leaded-glass paravents, and glass paintings.
2006	Abu Dhabi International Exhibition	Abu Dhabi	Architectural glass walls.
2006	City of Clearwater Municipal Services Building	Clearwater, Florida	Twelve glass paintings.
2014	Achim Freyer Kunsthaus	Berlin	Oil paintings.
