= Eurobest European Advertising Festival =

Advertising awards

Eurobest The European Festival of Creativity
- Status: Active
- Genre: Communications and Advertising
- Frequency: Yearly in early December
- Years active: 1988; 38 years ago
- Website: eurobest.com

The Eurobest Festival of Creativity (formerly the European Advertising Festival) is an annual event which celebrates and rewards "creative excellence" in creative communications, advertising and related fields in Europe.

The first Festival took place in Stockholm, Sweden, in December 2008, based on the Eurobest Awards, which were launched in 1988. It regularly moves to different host cities; in 2009, it took place in November at the Beurs van Berlage in Amsterdam, the Netherlands. In 2010, it takes place between 7 and 8 December in Hamburg, Germany.

In 2011, it was established the Festival would take place for three years at Cinema Sao Jorge in Lisbon. The third Eurobest in Lisbon took place from 4–6 December 2013.

In 2017, the Festival took place in London, United Kingdom.

The Festival is organised by the Cannes Lions International Festival of Creativity, owned by British publisher and conference organiser Informa after its acquisition of Ascential.

== The Awards ==
Started in 1988, the Eurobest Awards honour creativity over 14 different entry sections: PR, Film, Print, Outdoor, Direct, Promo & Activation, Media, Interactive, Mobile, Radio, Design, Craft, Integrated and Branded Content & Entertainment.

Every year, all the work entered into the Awards is judged at the Eurobest Festival by panels of expert, high-profile jurors. They decide on an initial shortlist and then on which pieces should earn Grand Prix, Gold, Silver and Bronze trophies.

Winners are revealed each year at the Eurobest Awards Ceremony, which concludes the Festival.

== The Festival ==
For 2010, speakers include Bob Greenberg (R/GA Global Chief Creative Officer), Jonathan Harries (Draftfcb Global Chief Creative Officer), James Hilton (AKQA Chief Creative Officer), Linus Karlsson (Mother Executive Creative Director), Filip Nilsson (Forsman & Bodenfors Executive Creative Director), Marcello Serpa (AlmapBBDO Chief Creative Officer) and Fernando Vega Olmos (JWT Creative Chairman of Continental Europe and Latam).

In 2012, some of the speakers on stage included artist Niels Shoe Meulman, Bompas & Parr, Sir John Hegarty, Aardman Animation's Peter Lord and Martin Green, the Head of Ceremonies for London 2012.
