= Sebastian Strasser =

German director

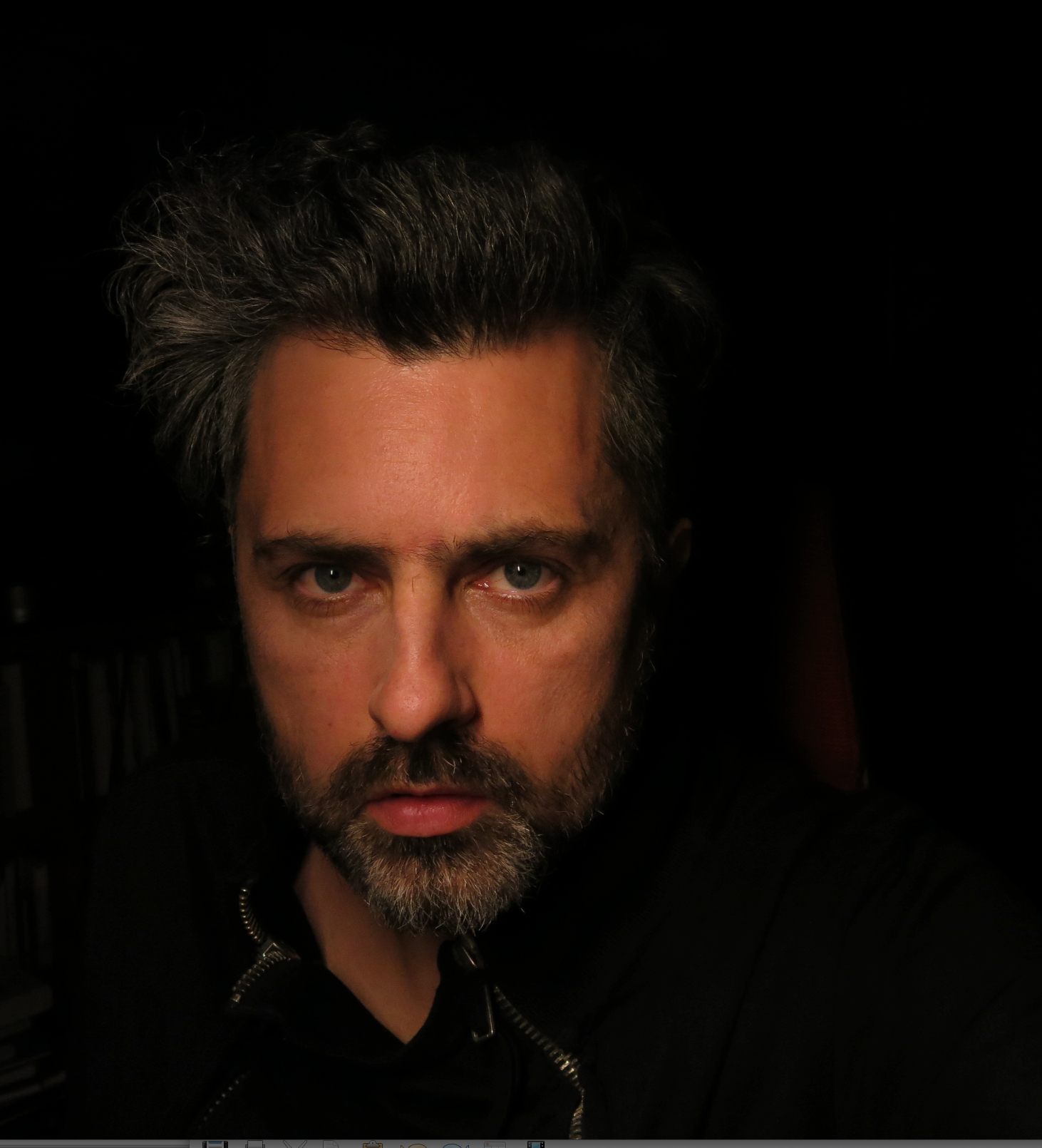
- Sebastian Strasser in 2017
- Born: Sibiu, Romania
- Occupation: Director
- Years active: 2000–present
- Website: www.sebastianstrasser.com

Sebastian Strasser is a German director for advertising and films, born in Transylvania. With over 250 international awards, including 22 Lions in Cannes, multiple Gold at the London IAA, New York Film Festival, D&AD, Eurobest European Advertising Festival, One Show, Clio Awards, Montreux, he is considered one of the most influential creatives of his generation. The Gunn Report has repeatedly listed him among the most awarded directors in the world, and his spot "Kids on Steps" for Volkswagen was elected among the 20 best commercials of the 21st century by the Gunn Report in 2015. His first short film, Happy End, premiered at Berlinale Filmfestival in 2005. In 2015, he founded the production company Anorak, followed by the innovative Studio Lipstick in 2023.

== Life ==
Sebastian Strasser's parents and grandparents were theatre actors, and he was on stage by the age of six. After graduating from the German Goethe College in Bucharest, he studied film at the Academy of Media Arts Cologne and subsequently worked at ARD, Germany's first public broadcasting channel, as a writer and journalist for the groundbreaking political TV shows "Zak" and "Privatfernsehen" with Friedrich Küppersbusch.

In 2000, Strasser transitioned to directing commercials and quickly rose to become one of the most influential directors worldwide. His works continue to set benchmarks in creative storytelling and technical brilliance.

In 2005 his first short film, Happy End (with Matthias Schweighöfer and Katharina Schüttler), was shown at the Berlinale film festival.

In 2016 Sebastian and his producing partner Christiane Dressler founded ANORAK, a Berlin-based production company, that ranked Nr. 1 in the creative ranking of the best production company in all years since foundation.

In 2016 Sebastian moved with his family to Los Angeles, where he is represented by Reset Content; his agents for film and television are at UTA: United Talent Agency.

In fall 2018, his dystopian series Darklands was picked up by Warner Brothers and is currently in development (writers room). The eight-episode drama television series, for which Sebastian signs as creator, writer, director and showrunner, is being co-written by Bernd Lange and produced by Ratpack Films.

In 2019 he wrote and directed Apparat: 15 min. short film, starring Ulrich Thomsen and Ayelet Zurer, with cinematography by Rodrigo Prieto. The film is produced by Radical Media and The Mill.

Through his AI studio, Lipstick, he produced a global campaign for Vodofone in 2024 that attracted widespread attention and debate within and beyond the advertising industry.

== Works ==
=== Selected awards ===
Year	Campaign / Film	Festival	Awards
2024	Renault "Revolution R5"	Cannes Lions International Festival of Creativity	Bronze - Production Design Bronze - Production in Achievement
2020	Mercedes "Bertha Benz"	ADC Europe	Gold - Direction Gold - Cinematography Gold - Editing Gold - Branded Content
2020	Mercedes "Bertha Benz"	One Show	Gold - Film Gold - Cinema advertising Silver - Online Films Bronze - Cinematography
2020	Mercedes "Bertha Benz"	ADC	x2 Gold - Cinematography, Editing x3 Silver - Direction, Camera, Casting x2 Bronze - Short form, Editing - single
2019	Mercedes "Bertha Benz"	Cannes Lions International Festival of Creativity	Silver Lion - Film/TV Silver Lion - Prod. Design Bronze Lion - Cinematography Bronze Lion - Casting
2019	Mercedes "Bertha Benz"	D&AD Awards	Graffite - Direction
2019	Mercedes "Bertha Benz"	London International Awards	Gold - Performance/casting Gold - Direction Gold - cinematography Gold - Editing Gold - Scripted short film Silver - Branded content
2019	Mercedes "Bertha Benz"	Epica Awards	Grand Prix - Film Gold - Film
2018	Volkswagen "Kid's Dreams"	Cannes Lions International Festival of Creativity	Silver Lion - Film/TV
2018	Volkswagen "Kid's Dreams"	New York Film Festival	Gold - Advertising
2018	Volkswagen "Kid's Dreams"	ADC	Gold - Promotional Spot Silver - Single Spot Silver - Point of Sale Bronze - Online Film ADC Award - Direction ADC Award - Casting
2017	Nissan "Battle Tested"	Cannes Lions International Festival of Creativity	Bronze Lion - Best VR
2016	Mercedes 'Time To Look Up Again'	London International Awards	Gold - Direction
2016	Mercedes 'Time To Look Up Again'	London International Awards	Gold - Cinematography
2016	Mercedes 'Time To Look Up Again'	London International Awards	Gold - Production Design
2016	Mercedes 'Time To Look Up Again'	London International Awards	Silver - Editing
2016	Mercedes 'Time To Look Up Again'	London International Awards	Silver - Visual Effects
2015	Audi 'Mechanics'	Cannes Lions International Festival of Creativity	2x Silver Lion - Film/TV
2015	Audi 'Mechanics'	ADC	Silver - TV/Kino Einzelspot
2015	Audi 'Mechanics'	ADC	Bronze - Director
2015	Audi 'Mechanics'	ADC	Bronze - DoP
2015	Audi 'Mechanics'	ADC	Bronze - Internetfilm
2014	Vodafone 'Add Power'	Cristal Festival Europe	Cristal & Grand Cristal
2014	Vodafone 'Add Power'	Clio	Gold
2014	BMW X4 X-World 'Embrace the Unknown'	Eurobest	Bronze
2013	Volkswagen 'People are People'	ADC	Silver
2012	ASOS 'Streetdance'	Cannes International Advertising Festival	Gold Lion - Design
2012	ASOS 'Streetdance'	Cannes International Advertising Festival	Bronze Lion – Best Video
2012	ASOS 'Streetdance'	Cannes International Advertising Festival	Bronze Lion – Best Soundtrack
2012	ASOS 'Streetdance'	Cannes Lions International Festival of Creativity	Gold Lion - Design
2012	ASOS 'Streetdance'	Cannes Lions International Festival of Creativity	Bronze Lion – Best Video
2012	ASOS 'Streetdance'	Cannes Lions International Festival of Creativity	Bronze Lion – Best Soundtrack
2012	ASOS 'Streetdance' Grand Prix Eurobest 2012	London International Awards	Silver
2012	Hornbach 'Let there be spring'	ADC	Silver - Film/Craft Direction
2012	Hornbach 'Let there be spring'	ADC	Silver - Film/Craft Camera
2012	Hornbach 'Let there be spring'	ADC	Bronze - Film/Craft Editing
2012	Hornbach 'Let there be spring'	ADC	Bronze - Music & Sound
2011	Hornbach 'Let there be spring'	VDW Germany	Gold - Best Director
2011	Hornbach 'Let there be spring'	VDW Germany	Gold - Best Sound Design
2011	Hornbach 'Let there be spring'	London International Awards	Silver - Use Of Music
2010	Citroen 'Le Chien'	D&AD	Gold - Best Director
2010	Citroen 'Le Chien'	Cannes International Advertising Festival	Silver Lion - Film Craft
2010	Citroen 'Le Chien'	Cannes International Advertising Festival	Bronze Lion - Film / Cars
2008	NSPCC 'Click'	London International Awards	Silver
2007	Volkswagen 'Dribbling Machine'	Art Directors Club	Gold
2006	Mini Cooper '30 Seconds'	Art Directors Club	Gold
2006	IKEA 'Freedom'	Cannes International Advertising Festival	Silver Lion
2006	IKEA 'Freedom'	Shark Awards	Gold
2005	Volkswagen 'Kids on steps'	New York Film Festival	Grand Prix
2005	Volkswagen 'Kids on steps'	New York Film Festival	Gold - World Medal
2005	Volkswagen 'Windup car'	New York Film Festival	Silver
2005	Volkswagen 'Windup car'	Mobius	Gold
2005	Volkswagen 'Kids on steps'	Cannes International Advertising Festival	Bronze Lion
2005	Volkswagen 'Kids on steps'	Golden Award of Montreux	Gold
2005	Mercedes-Benz 'Watering can'	Cannes International Advertising Festival	Bronze Lion
2005	Volkswagen 'Kids on steps'	Clio	Silver
2005	Volkswagen 'Kids on steps'	One Show	Silver
2005	Volkswagen 'Kids on steps'	London International Awards	Winner
2004	Volkswagen 'Windup car'	Eurobest	Gold
