= Emil Hinterfeld =

German bobsledder

Medal record

Men's Bobsleigh

Representing the (Germany) Weimar Republic

World Championships
Gold medal – first place	1931 St. Moritz	Four-man

Emil Hinterfeld was a German bobsledder who competed in the 1930s. He won the gold medal in the four-man event at the 1931 FIBT World Championships in St. Moritz.
