= Heinz Volkmer =

Austrian bobsledder

Medal record

Bobsleigh

World Championships
Bronze medal – third place	1931 Oberhof	Two-man

Heinz Volkmer was an Austrian bobsledder who competed in the late 1920s and early 1930s. He won a bronze medal in the two-man event at the 1931 FIBT World Championships in Oberhof.
