= Jack Newcombe =

British bobsledder

Personal information
- Nationality: England
- Born: 1910 Kent
- Died: 26 February 1931 (aged 20–21) Switzerland

Sport
- Sport: Bobsleigh
Medal record
FIBT World Championships
Bronze medal – third place	1931	four man

Jack Stewart Newcombe (1910-1931) was a British bobsledder who competed in the early 1930s. He won the bronze medal in the four-man event at the 1931 FIBT World Championships in St. Moritz.

== Bobsleigh ==
Newcombe was the brakeman and a member of the British and Royal Air Force bobsleigh team along with Pilot Officer Dennis Field (steersman), Pilot Officer Ralph Wallace and Pilot Officer Paddy Coote.

After the World Championships Newcombe fell ill and died of Peritonitis on 26 Feb 1931.

== Royal Air Force ==
Newcombe passed through RAF Cranwell on 26 July 1930 from the same class as Douglas Bader.
