= Patrick Coote =

Ireland international rugby union player, bobsledder & RAF officer

Paddy Coote
Personal information
- Born: 7 January 1910 Eton, Buckinghamshire, England
- Died: 13 April 1941 (aged 31) Trigonon
- Years active: 1928–33

Sport
- Country: United Kingdom; Ireland
- Sport: Bobsleigh; Rugby Union
- Club: Leicester Tigers
Medal record
FIBT World Championships
Bronze medal – third place	1931	four man

Patrick Bernard Coote (7 January 1910 – 19 April 1941) was a British bobsledder, Irish international rugby union player and Royal Air Force pilot. He played rugby for Leicester Tigers between 1931–33.

== Profile ==
Coote was born on 7 January 1910 in Eton, Buckinghamshire and attended Woking County School. He married Muriel Elsmie on the 1 June 1935.

== Bobsleigh ==
He represented Britain and the RAF and won the bronze medal in the four-man event at the 1931 FIBT World Championships in St. Moritz, along with Pilot Officer Dennis Field (steersman), Pilot Officer Ralph Wallace and Pilot Officer Jack Newcombe (brakeman).

== Rugby ==
In January 1928 Coote played his first game for the RAF against Cambridge University, he also represented the RAF in 1931 and 1932. Coote made his Leicester Tigers debut on 10 October 1931 at Kingsholm against Gloucester in a 12-6 defeat. He was described as a superb centre, scoring three tries in as many games in December 1931 against Blackheath, Birkenhead Park and the Barbarians. In 1932-33 season he established a centre partnership with fellow Irishman Morgan Crowe and was first choice goal kicker; despite only featuring in 16 games for the Tigers he was the seasons' top points scorer with 56. This season Coote also won his sole Ireland cap, playing against Scotland at Lansdowne Road in the 1933 Home Nations Championship.

Coote's rugby career was cut short by a bad injury on 18 November 1933 whilst playing for Leicester in a game against Swansea at their St Helen's ground. Coote damaged his neck in a tackle during the game but carried on, scoring a penalty in an 8-6 defeat; later, on the train home he collapsed and had to be taken to an RAF hospital. He stayed for 3 months before he could be discharged and never played rugby again.

== Royal Air Force ==
Coote joined the Royal Air Force as a flight cadet and passed through RAF Cranwell on 26 July 1930 becoming a Pilot Officer. Coote competed for the "Sword of Honour" award at the end of his two-year course, and beat Douglas Bader, his nearest rival. Coote went on to become the Wing Commander of Western Wing, British Air Forces Greece.

=== Death ===
Coote died while flying as an observer in a No. 211 Squadron Bristol Blenheim; there are conflicting reports of the date as some sources say 13 April 1941 whilst others give it as 19 April 1941. The aircraft in which he was flying, was likely shot down by Unteroffizier Fritz Gromotka. He is buried at the Phalron War Cemetery in Greece along with the rest of the crew.
