= FIBT World Championships 1931 =

Winter sport competition

1931 World Championships
- Location: Oberhof, Germany

The FIBT World Championships 1931 took place in Oberhof, Germany (Two-man) and in St. Moritz, Switzerland (Four-man). Two-man bobsleigh made its debut.

== Two man bobsleigh ==
Pos	Team	Time
Gold	Germany (Hanns Killian, Sebastian Huber)	
Silver	Germany (Bibo Fischer, Gemmer)	
Bronze	Austria (Heinz Volkmer, Anton Kaltenberger)	

== Four man bobsleigh ==
Pos	Team	Time
Gold	Germany (Werner Zahn, Robert Schmidt, Franz Bock, Emil Hinterfeld)	
Silver	Switzerland (René Fonjallaz, Gustave Fonjallaz, N. Buchheim, Gaston Fonjallaz)	
Bronze	United Kingdom (Dennis Field, Patrick Coote, Ralph Wallace, Jack Newcombe)	

== Medal table ==
Rank	Nation	Gold	Silver	Bronze	Total
1	Germany (GER)	2	1	0	3
2	Switzerland (SUI)	0	1	0	1
3	Austria (AUT)	0	0	1	1
3	Great Britain (GBR)	0	0	1	1
Totals (4 entries)		2	2	2	6
