= Werner Zahn =

German bobsledder

Medal record

Men's Bobsleigh

Representing the (Germany) Weimar Republic

World Championships
Gold medal – first place	1931 St. Moritz	Four-man

Werner Zahn (November 15, 1890 in Wiesloch, Germany – 1971 in Wolfenbüttel, West Germany) was a German bobsledder who competed in the 1930s. He won the gold medal in the four-man event at the 1931 FIBT World Championships in St. Moritz. He was also a veteran of World War I.
