= Anton Kaltenberger =

Austrian bobsledder

Personal information
- Full name: Anton Viktor Kaltenberger
- Nationality: Austrian
- Born: 23 February 1904 Vienna, Austria
- Died: 2 July 1979 (aged 75) Gloggnitz, Austria

Sport
- Sport: Bobsleigh
Medal record
Bobsleigh
World Championships
Bronze medal – third place	1931 Oberhof	Two-man

Anton Kaltenberger (23 February 1904 – 2 July 1979) was an Austrian bobsledder who competed in the late 1920s and early 1930s. He won a bronze medal in the two-man event at the 1931 FIBT World Championships in Oberhof.

Kaltenberger also finished 19th in the two-man event at the 1936 Winter Olympics in Garmisch-Partenkirchen.
