= Academy of Media Arts Cologne =

Art school in Cologne, Germany

Coordinates: 50.934°N 6.962°E

Academy of Media Arts
- Kunsthochschule für Medien Köln
- Type: Art and film school
- Established: 1989
- Chancellor: Dr. Caroline Krüger,
- Rector: Prof. Mathias Antlfinger
- Academic staff: exMedia/Literary Writing, Art, Film, Theory/Research
- Administrative staff: 120 members of staff
- Students: 389 (2020)
- Doctoral students: 13 (2020)
- Location: Cologne, North Rhine-Westphalia, Germany
- Campus: Urban
- Website: http://www.khm.de

The Academy of Media Arts Cologne (KunstHochschule für Medien Köln) is the art and film school of the state of North Rhine Westphalia. It was founded 1989 in Cologne, Germany. Notable artists and filmmakers who studied or taught at the academy include Rosa Barba, VALIE EXPORT, Karen Eliot, Marcel Odenbach, Jürgen Klauke, Phil Collins, Peter Lilienthal, Sophie Maintigneux, Julia Scher, Anthony Moore, Johannes Wohnseifer, Werner Nekes, Hans Weingartner, Jacob Kirkegaard, Sebastian Strasser, Li Yang, Beate Gütschow, Ubermorgen, Varvara & Mar, Joana Moll.

== History ==
The Academy of Media Arts Cologne (Kunsthochschule für Medien Köln, KHM) was established in 1989 by the state of North Rhine-Westphalia as a new type of art institution focused on media arts. The initiative was driven by the state's Ministry of Science and Research, aiming to create an interdisciplinary educational model that integrated art, film, and media theory.

The academy officially commenced operations on October 15, 1990, enrolling 25 students in a postgraduate diploma program titled "Audiovisual Media." In 1994, the institution expanded its offerings to include an undergraduate diploma program in the same field. Both programs were restructured and renamed "Mediale Künste" (Media Arts) in 2010. The undergraduate program spans nine semesters, while the postgraduate program covers four semesters.

In 2004, KHM introduced a doctoral program (Dr. phil.) focusing on the intersection of artistic inquiry and academic research.

== Locations ==
Initially, the academy operated from temporary facilities at the Overstolzenhaus and Peter-Welter-Platz 2. Over the years, it expanded into multiple buildings around Peter-Welter-Platz and Filzengraben. In late 2005, KHM consolidated its operations into a new complex at Filzengraben. The location strategy emphasized maintaining a central urban presence in Cologne.

In March 2024, the academy further expanded by acquiring additional space at Heumarkt 14, solidifying its presence in Cologne's city center.

== Study ==
The Academy of Media Arts Cologne (KHM) offers interdisciplinary programs in media and fine arts, structured as diploma courses rather than traditional bachelor's or master's degrees. The primary programs include:

=== Diploma 1 (Undergraduate Program) ===
- Duration: 9 semesters
- Structure: The initial three semesters focus on foundational studies in theory, artistic practice, and scientific areas. Semesters four to nine concentrate on individual artistic emphases, primarily anchored in the departments of ExMedia, film/television, and art.
- Degree Equivalence: The Diploma in Media Arts is internationally comparable to a Master of Fine Arts (MFA).

=== Diploma 2 (Postgraduate Program) ===
- Duration: 4 semesters
- Structure: This program is designed for students with prior academic or professional experience in the arts. It emphasizes intensive supervision of project work, discussions with mentors, and a variety of optional classes and lectures.

=== Doctoral Program ===
- Degree: Dr. phil. in the field of art and media studies
- Focus: The program combines artistic inquiry with academic research, aiming to produce new insights at the intersection of art and science.

=== Areas of Study ===
Students can specialize in various disciplines, including:

- Animation / 3D Animation / Games
- Cinematography / Editing
- Screenwriting / Dramaturgy / Literary Writing
- Experimental Film / Video Art
- Artistic Photography
- Sound Art
- Creative Producing / TV Formats / Live Direction
- Art and Media Studies
- Public Art / Performance / Installation
- Politics of Networks and Devices / Interface / Code
- Directing for Feature and Documentary Film

=== Admission and Language Requirements ===
- Application Period: Mid-October to January/February for the winter semester
- Requirements: Submission of artistic work samples (e.g., videos, photographs, texts) and an essay interpreting a given theme
- Language: Courses are primarily conducted in German; proficiency at the B2 level is expected for non-native speakers

=== Student body ===
Approximately 400 students are enrolled at KHM, with at least one-third coming from abroad. Each winter semester, around 70 new applicants are accepted.

== Library ==
The Academy of Media Arts Cologne maintains a specialized library and media center that supports the institution's academic and artistic programs. The collection encompasses a variety of materials, including books, periodicals, films, sound recordings, and digital resources, focusing on media arts and related disciplines.

The library provides access to digital collections such as e-books, e-journals, subject-specific databases, streaming services, and language courses. Some resources are accessible remotely via institutional login, while others require on-campus access or personal registration.

Located in the historic Overstolzenhaus at Rheingasse 8, the library is open to both students and the public, serving as a resource for research and artistic practice.
