= Dennis Field =

British bobsledder

Personal information
- Nationality: England

Sport
- Sport: Bobsleigh
Medal record
FIBT World Championships
Bronze medal – third place	1931	four man

Dennis Brian Douglas Field (died 6 June 1940) was a British bobsledder who competed in the early 1930s. He won the bronze medal in the four-man event at the 1931 FIBT World Championships in St. Moritz.

Field was a member of the Royal Air Force and was the steersman in the four man bobsleigh along with Pilot Officer Jack Newcombe (brakeman), Pilot Officer Ralph Wallace and Pilot Officer Paddy Coote.

Field was killed in action over Germany in 1940.
