= Gauangelbach =

River in Germany

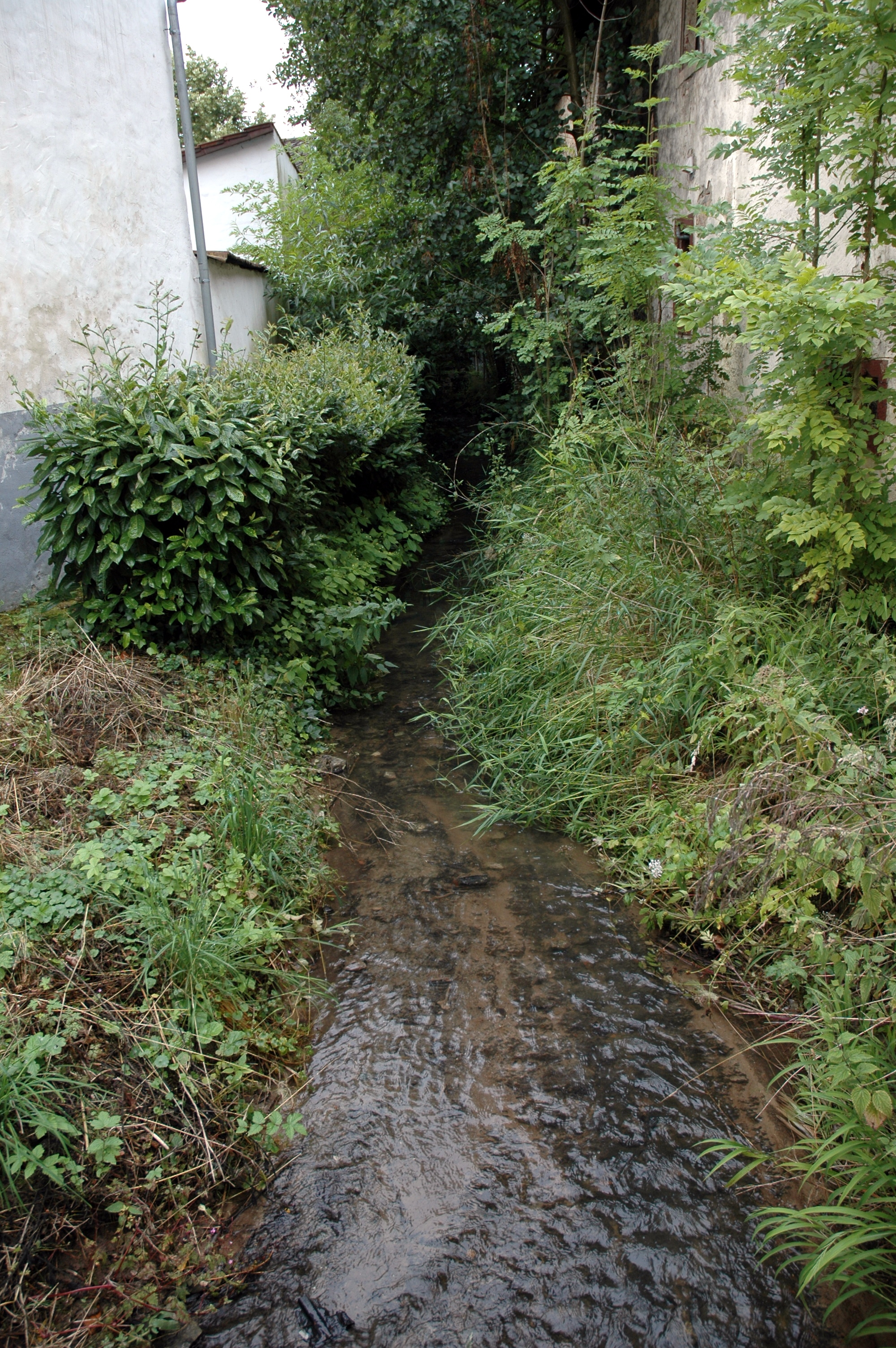

Location
- Country: Germany
- State: Baden-Württemberg

Physical characteristics
- Mouth
  - location: Leimbach
  - coordinates: 49.2831°N 8.7499°E
- Length: 13.3 km (8.3 mi)

Basin features
- Progression: Leimbach→ Rhine→ North Sea

Gauangelbach is a river of Baden-Württemberg, Germany. It flows into the Leimbach in Dielheim. enpferch.[2] It soon emerges from the forest, crosses the Rodungsinsel to the south, intersects the L 600 that runs through it and then follows the edge of the Gauangellocher Teich forest area, before turning south-east through this forest in the direction of Gauangelloch.

The Path of the River starts at the edge of the forest on the Untere Weidenklinge district. The water then disappears into a canal and only reappears on the outskirts of Gauangelloch at the Bettendorff moated Gauangelloch castle. After traveling about 1 kilometers south, it reaches the municipal boundary with Schatthausen. Past the moated castle and the village of Schatthausen, the stream turns to the southwest. And at the height of the Hohenhardt golf course, it takes in the Ochsenbach and then the Maisbach from the left.

The Gauangelbach reaches the following valley town of Baiertal in the middle of an arc to the west. Below the town its valley runs in a south-westerly direction at the Dielheimer Unterhof to that of the Leimbach. But only after a rest of almost a kilometer in its right floodplain does the Gauangelbach flow into the Leimbach from the right and east, just under half a kilometer before the settlement boundary of Dielheim.

The Gauangelbach is 13.3 km long, drains 26.9 km² and has an average bed gradient of 15 ‰.

== See also ==
- List of rivers of Baden-Württemberg
