= Jonathan Harries =

Chairman emeritus and executive advisor

Jonathan Harries was chairman emeritus and executive advisor, global creative of FCB (advertising agency), one of the world's largest global advertising agency networks with more than 8,000 employees across 80 countries.

== Career ==
Harries began his advertising career as a copywriter at the Foote, Cone & Belding (FCB) office in Johannesburg, South Africa, then called Lindsay Smithers, initially offering to work for free. Before long, he had worked his way up to deputy chairman and executive creative director of Grey-Phillips. In 1986, Harries came to the United States and spent two years at Grey Global Group in New York before moving to Leo Burnett in Chicago, and eventually served at the helm of Hal Riney & Partners in its Chicago office in 1990.

In 1997, Harries returned to FCB Chicago to lead the creative department as the agency's executive creative director. In 2004, he became worldwide creative director and, that same year, was named CEO of FCB Chicago – the first time a creative had served in that role since Fairfax M. Cone. Throughout his tenure in Chicago, Harries worked on campaigns for such brands as Gatorade, Coors Light and Kraft Foods, and served as the global creative director on S.C. Johnson & Son. Harries has also maintained a major role on the Beiersdorf account team.

In 2005, Harries was named one of the "Who's Who" by Crain's Chicago Business. In 2006, he was appointed chief creative officer of FCB Global, after the merger between Draft and FCB, until 2015, when he became global chairman.

Throughout his career, Harries has served as a keynote speaker or on creative juries at award shows, including El Ojo de Iberoamérica, Dubai Lynx and the Cannes Lions International Festival of Creativity, where he was also a guest blogger for Adweek. In 2017, Harries became chairman emeritus of FCB Global.

Harries published his first novel, "Killing Harry Bones," in July 2017 He followed that up with a stand alone novel “Infatuation” in 2018. In 2019 “Killing Bobby Fatt”, the follow-up to Killing Harry Bones was published and in early 2020 “Killing Valerian Zolotov”, the final of the Roger Storm series came out. His latest novel, “The Tailor of Riga, a family saga of dubious veracity was published in May 2020.
