= MLP SE =

German financial service provider

- Company type: Societas Europaea
- Traded as: FWB: MLP; SDAX
- Industry: Financial services
- Founded: 1971
- Headquarters: Wiesloch, Germany
- Key people: Uwe Schroeder-Wildberg (CEO and chairman of the executive board), Peter Lütke-Bornefeld (Chairman of the supervisory board)
- Products: Asset management, insurance, financial advisory, ratings agency, investment research
- Revenue: €480.5 million (2013)
- Operating income: €32.8 million (2013)
- Net income: €25.5 million (2013)
- AUM: €24.5 billion (end 2013)
- Total assets: €1.537 billion (end 2013)
- Total equity: €374.5 million (end 2013)
- Number of employees: 1,559 (end 2013)
- Website: www.mlp-ag.com

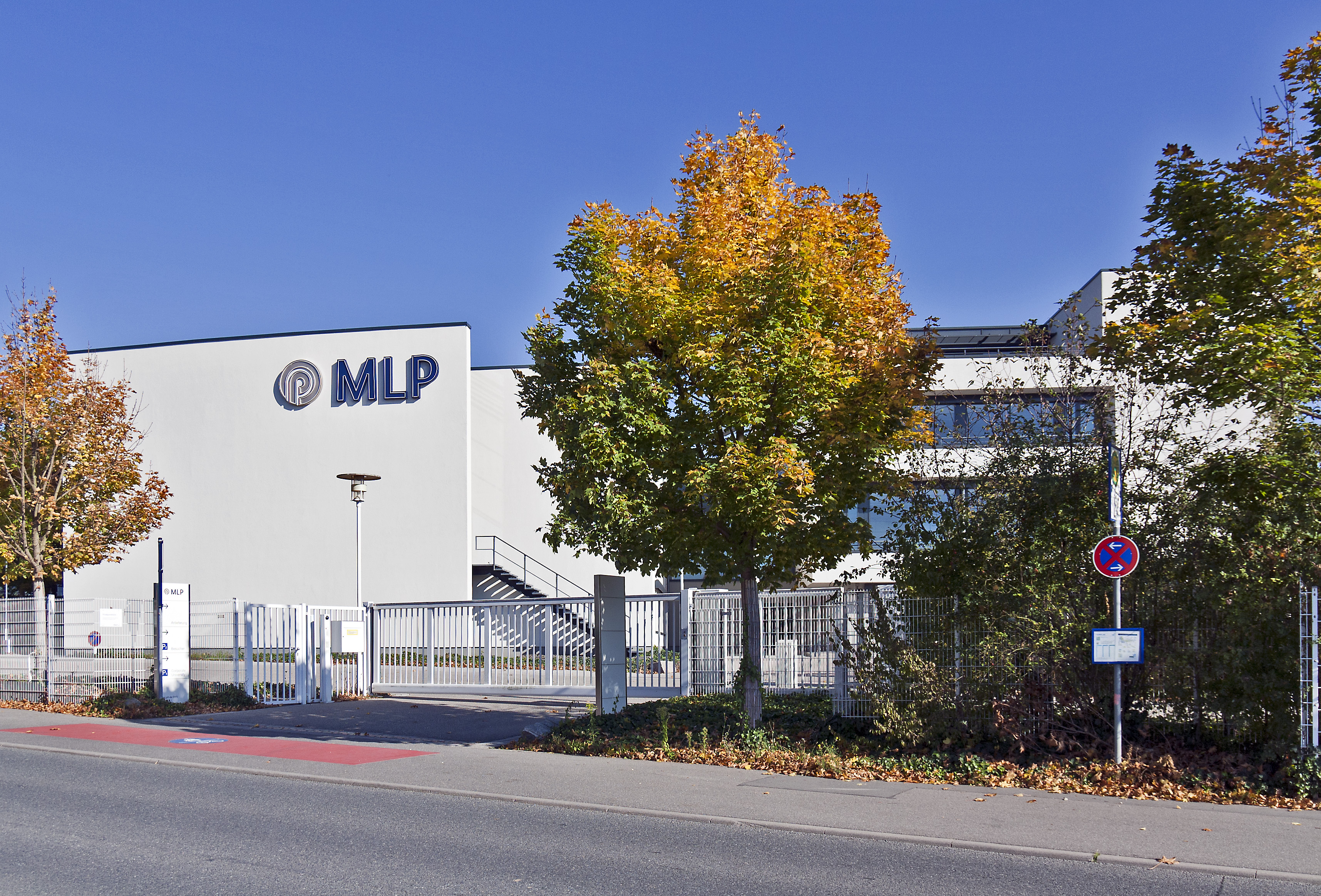

MLP SE (formerly MLP AG, founded as Marschollek, Lautenschläger und Partner GbR) is a German corporation providing financial services, especially personal financial planning advisory. It is based in Wiesloch, Baden-Württemberg and was founded on 1 January 1971 in Heidelberg by Eicke Marschollek and Manfred Lautenschläger.

MLP focuses on providing financial services consulting in the domains of pension provision, asset management and risk management to an upscale group of university graduates and wealthy clients. Most of the mediated insurances consist in life, disability, health and annuity insurances.

== Structure ==
=== General Information ===
Financial services like investment trusts, insurance enterprises and banks are afforded cost-effective market access by external agents, because of the lack of maintenance of their own distribution networks. For them, MLP is an attractive agent, because it is geared towards the group of university graduates, who have good chances for safe employment and upcoming wealth - MLP pursues future customers already at the university.
In 2013 MLP had around 830,300 clients, served by about 1,998 independent consultants and 1,559 permanent MLP employees as of 2013.

=== Personnel structure ===
Most of the consultants have an academical background, mostly in the same branch of study as their future customers. They act independently, but are supported by MLP in getting an office in one of the agencies and possibly further education. In 1999, MLP founded the MLP Corporate University, which officiates as the main centre for basic and further education of consultants working for MLP. The wage-system is based mostly on commissions and premium outlays. In their first year, the consultants receive a small wage of 1,250 EUR per month. This allows that the students do not have to pay for the advisory services.

=== Shareholders ===
Interest	Shareholder
23,53%	Manfred Lautenschläger; D
9,89%	Talanx AG; D
9,82%	Harris Associates L.P.; USA
7,10%	FMR LLC
6,67%	Barmenia; D
6,27%	ALLIANZ SE; D
6,03%	Angelika Lautenschläger; D
4,99%	Fidelity Management & Research Company
4,84%	Berenberg Bank; D
3,06%	Franklin Templeton Investment Funds
0,73%	Uberior Ena Ltd. (HBOS); UK

== History ==
=== Beginning ===
MLP was founded on 1 January 1971 in Heidelberg by the insurance broker Eicke Marschollek and the law graduate Manfred Lautenschläger. The business idea was from the outset to specialize on young graduates, especially on students of law. This specialization charged a market gap and they rapidly enlarged the target group on other graduates like budding medical practitioners.

=== Way to the flotation ===
In 1972, MLP transformed from a GbR to a KG. In 1974, this success allowed, apart from the transformation into a GmbH, the opening of agencies in Wiesbaden, Bonn and Düsseldorf. After adding engineers and economists to their target group, the first step for the flotation on 15 June 1988 was taken in 1984, by transforming MLP into an AG. From this moment onwards, MLP grew quickly and in 1997, MLP became represented in the MDAX. The corporate headquarters moved from Heidelberg to Wiesloch in 2001 and on 30 July 2001 MLP became part of the DAX as one of the 30 biggest publicly traded companies in Germany and stayed there until 2003.

=== International activities ===
MLP's international activities started in Austria in 1995. Dedications of agencies in Switzerland in 1998 and in the Netherlands in 2000 followed. MLP expanded to Great Britain a year later and to Spain in 2002. But in the course of consolidation in 2003, MLP once again began concentrating its activities on Germany and closed its agencies in Spain and Great Britain in 2007. The closing of agencies in Austria and in the Netherlands followed in 2008.

== Sponsorship ==
Since 2012, the company has been the main sponsor for the USC Heidelberg Basketball Bundesliga team, which is now called MLP Academics Heidelberg.

== See also ==
- List of banks in Germany
