= René Fonjallaz =

Swiss bobsledder (1907–1982)

Medal record

Bobsleigh

World Championships
Silver medal – second place	1931 St. Moritz	Four-man

René Fonjallaz (1907 – 26 December 1993) was a Swiss bobsledder who competed in the late 1920s and early 1930s. He won the silver medal in the four-man event at the 1931 FIBT World Championships in St. Moritz. Fonjallaz also finished eighth in the five-man event at the 1928 Winter Olympics in St. Moritz.
