= Fonjallaz (vineyard) =

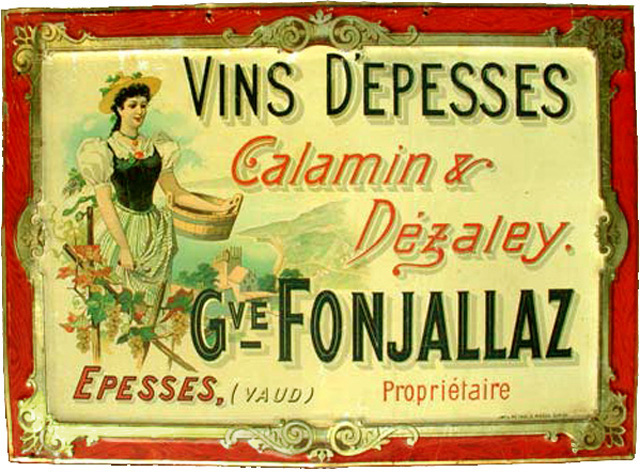
- Industry: Winery
- Founded: 1552
- Headquarters: Ruelle du Petit-Crêt 1, CH - 1098 Epesses, canton of Vaud, Switzerland
- Key people: Patrick Fonjallaz
- Website: www.patrick-fonjallaz.ch/en

Fonjallaz is a traditional winery in Epesses, Switzerland, the family business founded in 1552.

The basic facts:

- The region was used for the wine production from 12th century, when Bishop of Lausanne gave uncultivated soil to Cistercian monks.
- In 1552, the Fonjallaz family started the viticulture tradition.
- Today the winery is managed by Patrick Fonjallaz in the 12th family generation.
- The vineyard area is about 34 hectares and the slope is 30-50 percent.

== See also ==
- Swiss wine
- List of oldest companies
