= Karl Hermann Zahn =

- Born: December 3, 1865; Beiertal, Grand Duchy of Baden
- Died: February 8, 1940 (aged 74); Haigerloch, Germany
- Occupation(s): Botanist, professor

Karl Hermann Zahn (3 December 1865, Baiertal – 8 February 1940, Haigerloch) was a German botanist who was a leading authority regarding the genus Hieracium (hawkweed).

He received his education in Karlsruhe (1884–85), and beginning in 1891, worked as a high school teacher in Heidelberg. He later taught high school classes in Freiburg im Breisgau and in Donaueschingen. In 1923 he was appointed professor of geometry, chemistry and material technology at Karlsruhe University of Applied Sciences.

== Published works ==
- Die Hieracien der Schweiz, 1906 – Hieracium of Switzerland.
- Les Hieracium des Alpes maritimes, 1916 – Hieracium of the Maritime Alps.
- Compositae-Hieracium, (published in 12 editions from 1921 to 1957).

Zahn made valuable contributions involving Hieracium towards Adolf Engler's "Das Pflanzenreich", as well as to Ascherson and Graebner's "Synopsis der mitteleuropäischen Flora".

Zahn edited and distributed the exsiccata series Hieraciotheca Europaea edita e Carolo Hermanno Zahn (1906–1914).
