= Gustave Fonjallaz =

Swiss bobsledder

Medal record

Bobsleigh

World Championships
Silver medal – second place	1931 St. Moritz	Four-man

Gustave Fonjallaz (born 1910, date of death unknown) was a Swiss bobsledder who competed in the late 1920s and early 1930s. He won the silver medal in the four-man event at the 1931 FIBT World Championships in St. Moritz.
