= Markgräflerland =

Region of Germany

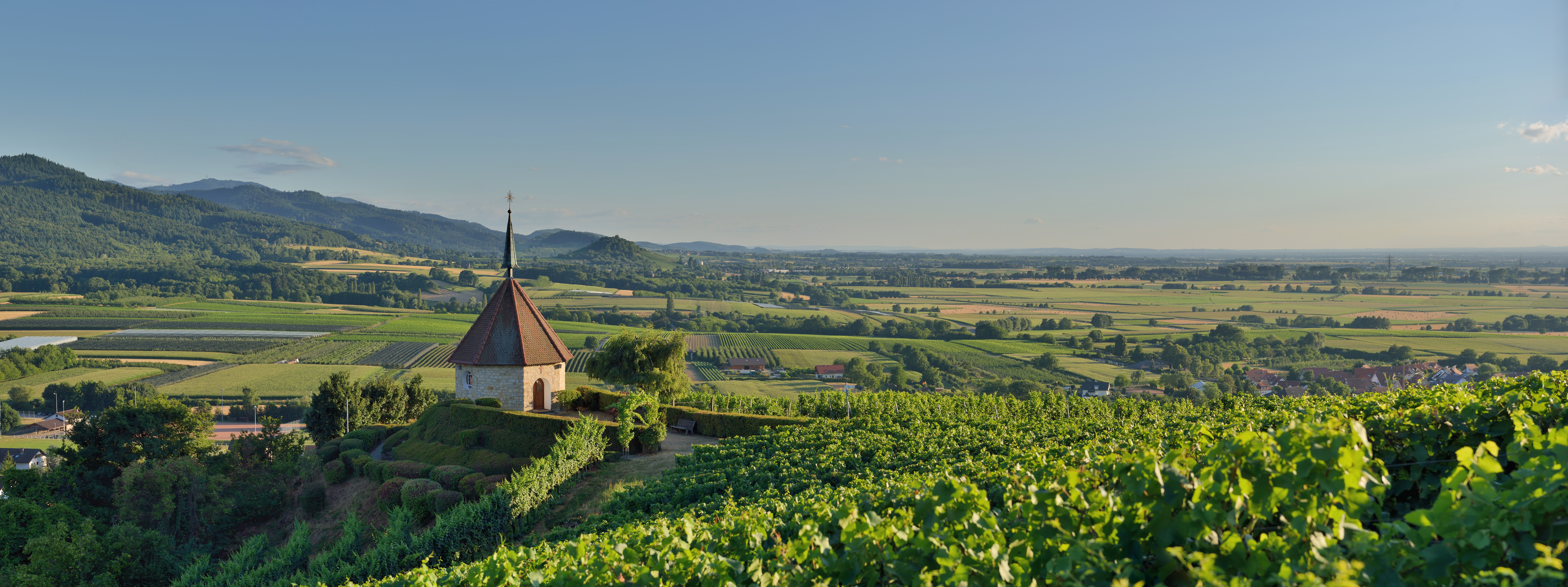
Chapel of Ehrenstetten in the Markgräflerland with typical landscape

Markgräflerland (German pronunciation: [ˈmaʁkɡʁɛːflɐˌlant]) is a region in the southwest of Germany, in the south of the German federal state of Baden-Württemberg, located between the Breisgau in the north and the Black Forest in the east; adjacent to west with France and in the south with Switzerland.

== History and geography ==
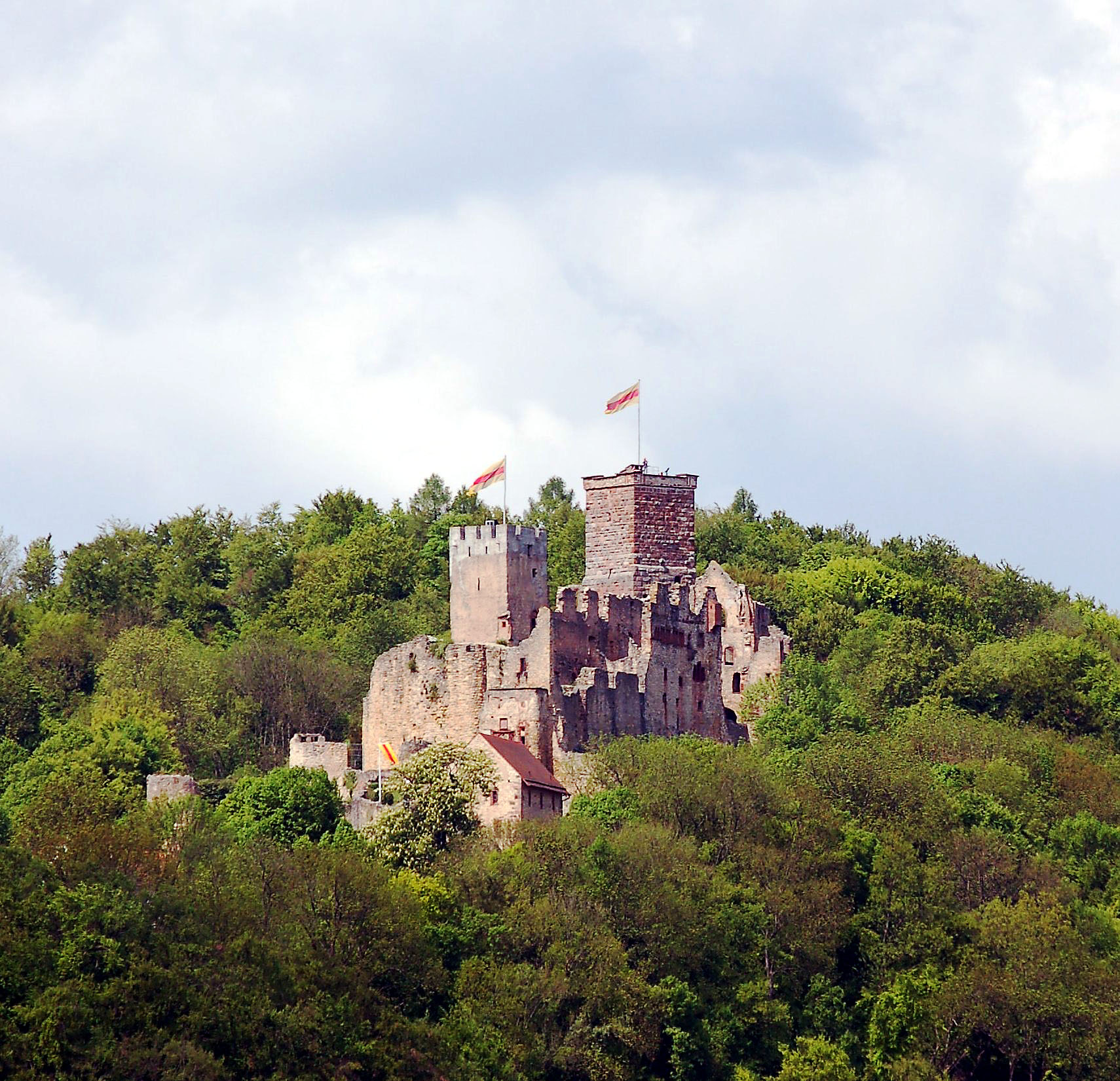
Rötteln Castle near Lörrach

The name translates to Margraves' Land, in reference to the Margraves of Baden. They ruled the area from the 12th century as a margraviate of the Holy Roman Empire until its elevation to the Grand Duchy of Baden in 1806, following the Empire's dissolution. Markgräflerland is the combination of three lordships: Badenweiler, Rötteln and Sausenburg. In 1556 the Markgraf (Margrave) became Protestant following the actions of the German monk Martin Luther.

The river Rhine marks the frontier to France in the west and Switzerland in the south. Markgräflerland is considered to be part of the transnational metropolitan area that includes Freiburg, Basel, and Mulhouse. This region of Germany, also called the Dreiländereck (three-country corner), includes many towns, but it is generally accepted that the center of the region is the town of Müllheim. Historically the region was a bit smaller, only reaching to Heitersheim in the north. The largest mountain in the region, the Blauen, lies on the outside border.

== Viticulture ==
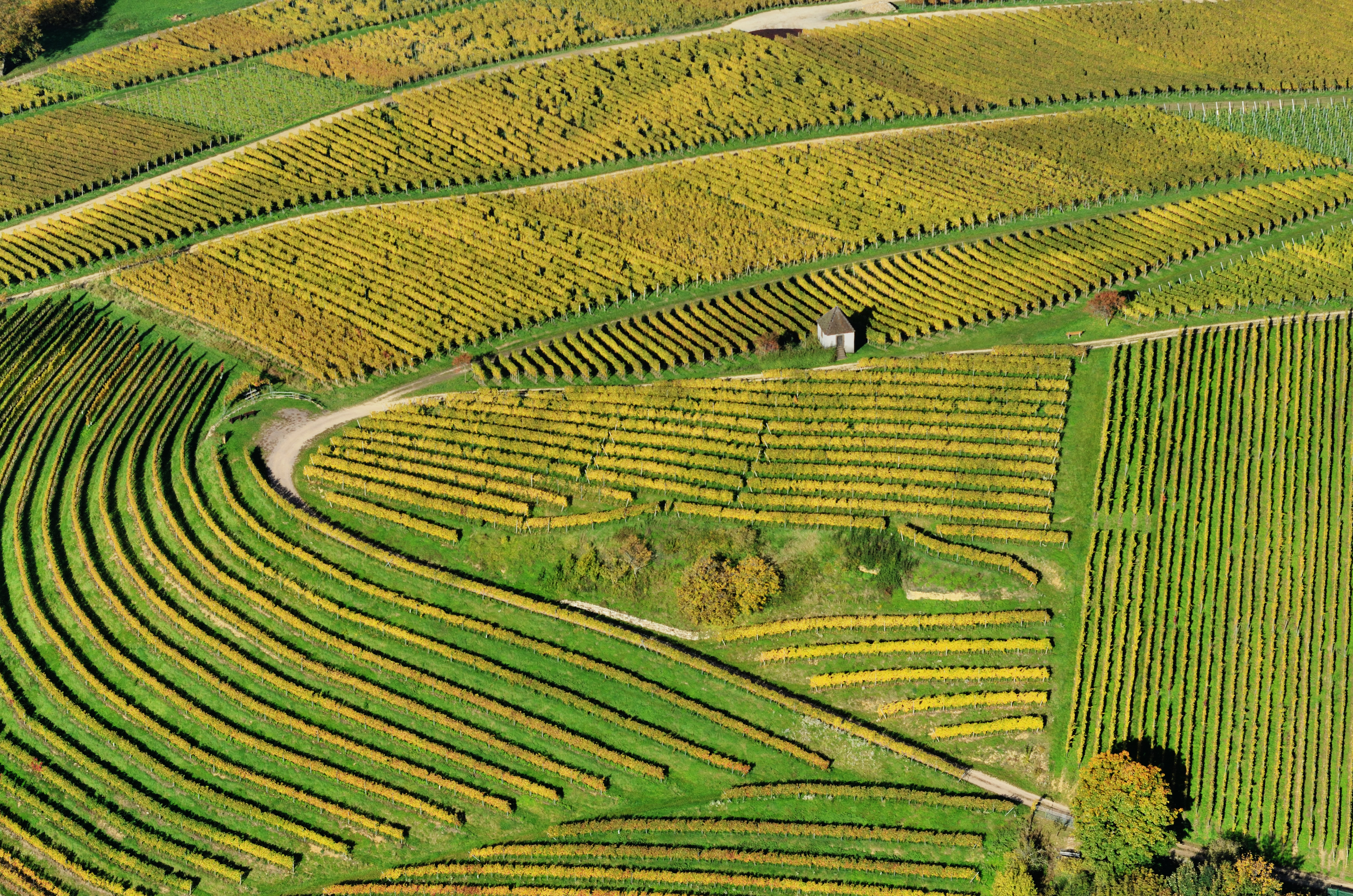
Aerial view of vineyards in Markgräflerland

The region is known for its vineyards. A unique grape variety is the Gutedel grape, also known as Chasselas, which probably made its way into the region in 1780 from Vevey in Switzerland; this grape is also used in some of the viticulture on the northern shore of Lake Constance. Other popular varieties in the region include Müller-Thurgau, Grau Burgunder (Pinot gris), Weiss Burgunder (Pinot blanc), Spätburgunder (Pinot noir) and Weissherbst. Other agricultural products include Spargel (white asparagus) and cherries.

The region is often called the Tuscany of Germany, referring to the Tuscan region of Italy, due in part to its climate, milder than the rest of the nation.

== Language ==
This region is home to the German dialect known as Alemannisch. The most famous writer of Alemannisch literature is Johann Peter Hebel.

== Cities and towns ==
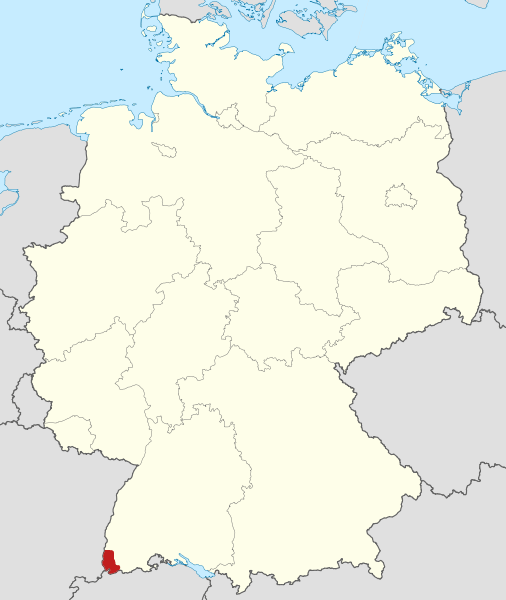
Location of the Markgräflerland region in Germany

Markgräflerland includes (among others) the following locations:

Auggen, Badenweiler, Ballrechten-Dottingen, Betberg, Binzen, Bollschweil, Britzingen, Buggingen, Dattingen, Dossenbach, Efringen-Kirchen, Eimeldingen, Gersbach, Hach, Hartheim am Rhein, Hammerstein, Hausen im Wiesental, Heitersheim, Hügelheim, Inzlingen, Kandern, Kleinkems, Lörrach, Malsburg, Marzell, Müllheim, Neuenburg, Neuenweg, Riedlingen, Schliengen, Schopfheim, Seefelden, Steinen, Sulzburg, Tegernau, Vögisheim, Weil am Rhein, Wies, Wieslet, Weitenau, Wollbach.
