= Tegernau =

- Ortsteil of Kleines Wiesental
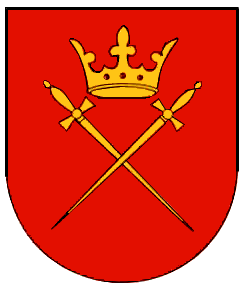
- Coat of arms
- Interactive map of Tegernau
- Location within Germany Location within Baden-Württemberg
- Coordinates: 47°43′11″N 07°47′40″E
- Country: Germany
- State: Baden-Württemberg
- Admin. region: Freiburg
- District: Lörrach
- Town: Kleines Wiesental

Area
  - Total: 10.15 km^{2} (3.92 sq mi)
- Elevation: 443 m (1,453 ft)

Population (2006-12-31)
  - Total: 389
  - Density: 38.3/km^{2} (99.3/sq mi)
- Time zone: UTC+01:00 (CET)
  - Summer (DST): UTC+02:00 (CEST)
- Postal codes: 79692
- Dialling codes: 07629
- Vehicle registration: LÖ
- Website: www.tegernau.de

Tegernau is a small village and a former municipality in the district of Lörrach in Baden-Württemberg in Germany. Since 1 January 2009, it is part of the municipality Kleines Wiesental.

== Geography ==
=== Location ===
Tegernau is located in the Southern Black Forest Nature Park in the valley of the Kleine Wiese. To the west of Tegernau, the Lipple Pass leads to the Kandertal valley via the Landesstraße 140. To the east, the L 140 goes to the Wiesental Valley via Gresgen, and ends in the town of Zell (Mosel). In the town itself, the L 140 crosses through, leading to Schopfheim and the Neuenweg Valley.

=== Villages ===
The former municipality of Tegernau contains the villages of Tegernau, Niedertegernau, Schwand, and the House of Käppeli. It also contains the single house Kuhnigraben. The former parish area includes the abandoned villages of Steiningen and Wolfgeringen as well as the abandoned castle of Neu-Waldeck, belonging to the Lords of Waldeck.

== History ==
Tegernau was first mentioned under the name Tegernowa in 1113; it was later referred to as Tegernau in a Papal bull in 1139. During the 13th century, the Tegernau noble family named itself after the village. At the time, there was already a church in the village, which served as a central location and meeting place for the many small villages of the valley; most of which did not have their own church. In 1503, the village came under the control of the Margraves of Baden-Durlach, who introduced the Reformation in 1556. On January 1, 2009, the previously independent municipality of Tegernau was incorporated into the newly founded municipality of Kleines Wiesental.

== Political System ==
Tegernau is the center of Kleines Wiesental geographically as well as administratively. Prior to the municipalities of Bürchau, Elbenschwand, Neuenweg, Raich, Sallneck, Tegernau, Wies and Wieslet merging into the municipality of Kleines Wiesental, the “Kleines Wiesental” municipal administration association was based in Tegernau. The municipal administration association carried out the majority of the municipal administrative tasks of its eight member municipalities. Its territory covered an area of 77.8 km² with just under 3,000 inhabitants.

=== Coat of Arms ===
The current coat of arms was granted by the Baden-Württemberg Ministry of the Interior in 1965. The coat of arms could already be seen on the municipal seal at the beginning of the 19th century. In 1902, the General State Archives of Baden proposed a variant based on the royal family of Tegernau, which showed two diagonally crossed golden arrows pointing upwards. The colors red and gold referred to the Baden coat of arms. This proposal was not implemented until the 1930s, but the old coat of arms returned in the post-war period.

== Notable Architecture ==
- Tegernau Protestant Church
- Church of the Immaculate Conception of the Virgin Mary

== Notable people ==
- Johann Georg Grether (1777-1846), Lord Mayor of Lörrach, member of the Baden Assembly of Estates
- Johann Friedrich Haug (1730-1793), piano maker and teacher at the Hohe Karlsschule in Stuttgart
