= Schliengen =

- Municipality
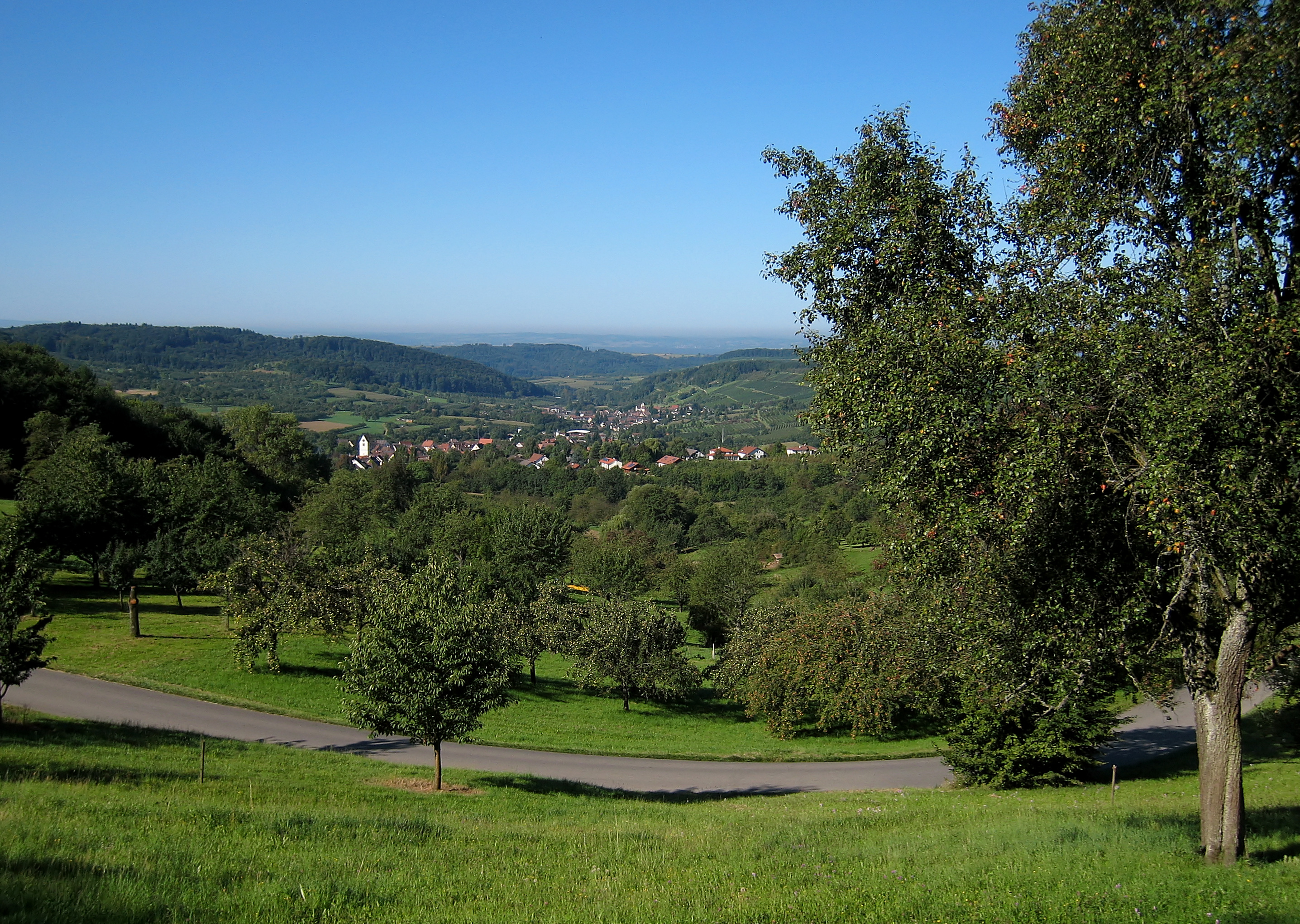
- Schliengen

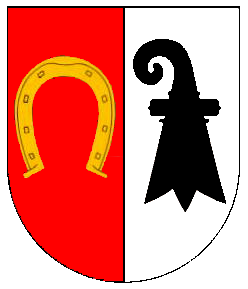
- Coat of arms

- Location of Schliengen within Lörrach district
- Interactive map of Schliengen
- Location within Germany Location within Baden-Württemberg
- Coordinates: 47°45′20″N 7°34′38″E
- Country: Germany
- State: Baden-Württemberg
- Admin. region: Freiburg
- District: Lörrach
- Subdivisions: 5

Government
  - Mayor (2019–27): Christian Renkert (CDU)

Area
  - Total: 37.46 km^{2} (14.46 sq mi)
- Elevation: 250 m (820 ft)

Population (2025-12-31)
  - Total: 6,227
  - Density: 166.2/km^{2} (430.5/sq mi)
- Time zone: UTC+01:00 (CET)
  - Summer (DST): UTC+02:00 (CEST)
- Postal codes: 79418
- Dialling codes: 07635
- Vehicle registration: LÖ
- Website: www.schliengen.de

Schliengen (German pronunciation: [ˈʃliːŋən]) is a municipality in southwestern Germany in the state of Baden-Württemberg, in the Kreis (district) of Lörrach. Schliengen's claim to international fame is the Battle of Schliengen (24 October 1796), fought between forces of the French Revolutionary army under Jean-Victor Moreau and the Austrian army under Karl von Österreich-Teschen. As both sides claimed victory, the battle is commemorated on a monument in Vienna and on the Arc de Triomphe in Paris.

== Geography ==
=== Location ===
The town of Schliengen is located in the Markgräflerland between Müllheim and the district town of Lörrach. The area of the municipality stretches from the Upper Rhine Plain (elev. 225 m/738 ft) to the top of the Blauen or Hochblauen (elev. 1165 m/3,822 ft).

=== Neighboring municipalities ===
The municipality of Schliengen is bordered on the north by Auggen, in the northeast by Feldberg (a borough of Müllheim), both of which are in Kreis (district) Breisgau-Hochschwarzwald, in the east by Malsburg-Marzell, in the south by the towns of Kandern and Bad Bellingen, and on the west by Steinenstadt, a borough of Neuenburg am Rhein, which is again in the Breisgau-Hochschwarzwald district.

=== Boroughs (Ortsteile) ===
The municipality of Schliengen contains the following boroughs (Ortsteile); Liel, Mauchen, Niedereggenen, Obereggenen and Schallsingen.

Lutheran churches exist in Niedereggenen, Obereggenen and Feldberg.

== History ==
The first official historical mention of Schliengen was in 820. It belonged formerly to the prince-bishopric of Basel. In 1796, Schliengen was the site of a battle between the French army commanded by Jean Victor Marie Moreau and the Coalition Army commanded by Archduke Charles of Austria. After the secularization which was a result of the German Mediatisation (de:Reichsdeputationshauptschluss) of 1803, Schliengen became a part of the Grand Duchy of Baden. The railway first reached Schliengen a 15 June 1847 when the track to Müllheim was completed. Schliengen was traditionally a part of the district of Müllheim, but has been part of the district of Lörrach since the district reform of 1973.

=== Religion ===
As a part of the prince-bishopric of Basel the Reformation passed Schliengen by. As a result, the area is still today mainly Roman Catholic. There are however Lutheran churches in Schliengen and each of its boroughs.

=== Town council ===
Since the election of 13 July 2004, the town council consists of the mayor and 22 council members. The election brought the following results:

Party	Share of votes	Change	Seats won	Change
CDU	36.6%	−9.2	9	±0
SPD	28.4%	+0.3	6	±0
FDP	20.8%	+0.9	5	+1
Green	12.1%	+5.9	2	+1
Other	2.1%	+2.1	0	±0

=== Town Twinning ===
Since 1989 Schliengen's official sister city has been Nidau am Bielersee in Switzerland.

== Culture and items of interest ==
=== Buildings ===
Schloss Bürgeln (Bürgeln Palace)

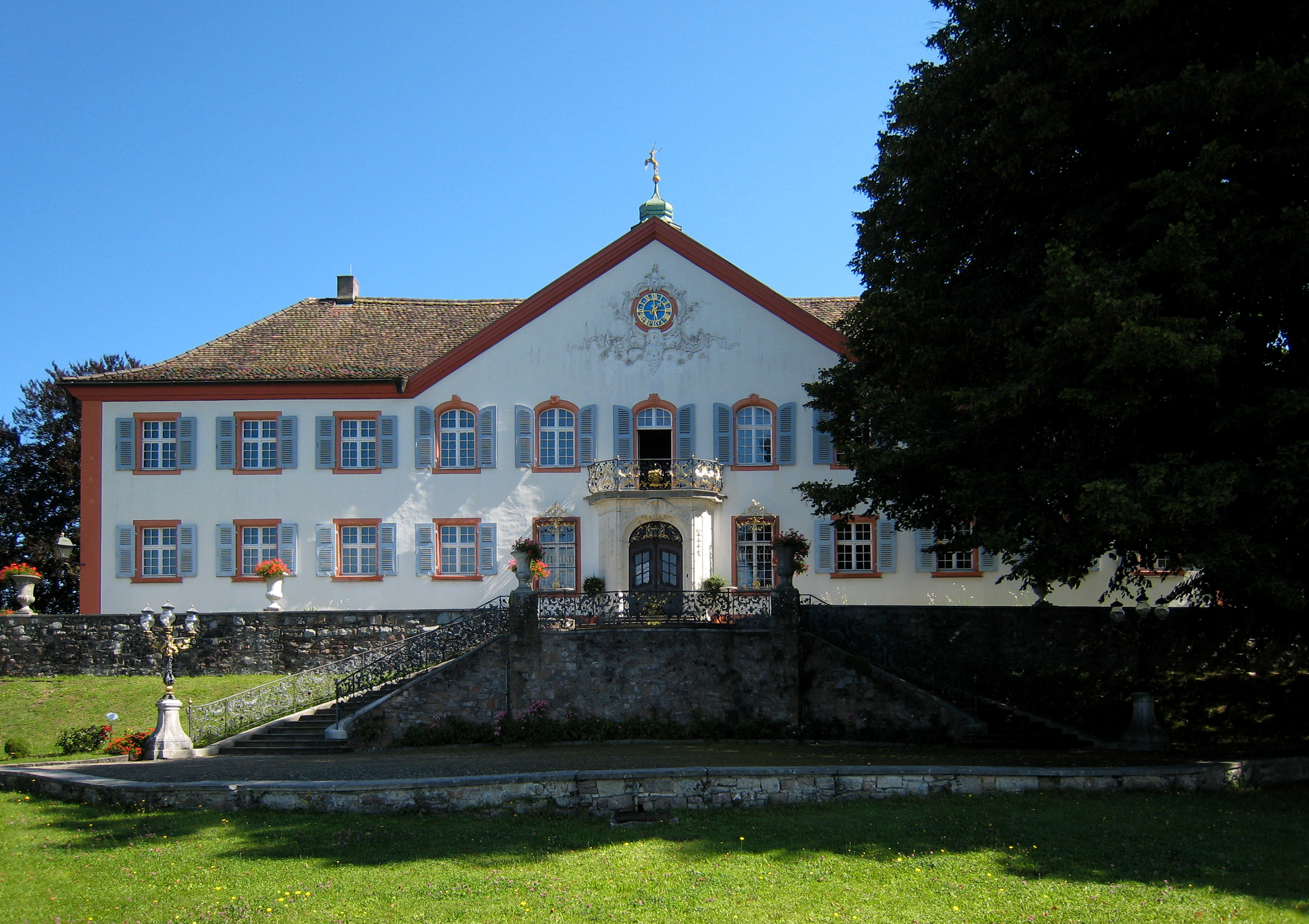
Schloss Bürgeln Schliengen in Summer

The palace lies high over the vineyards of the Markgräflerland, between blooming cherry trees, fields, and woods. It was built in the 11th century as a church, and from 1100 as a monastery. In 1762 the palace was rebuilt by Provost Aloysius Mader and Abbot Meinrad Troger. The palace was threatened with closure in 1920, which was prevented through the formation of the Bürgeln-Bund (Bürgeln Federation). It is now privately owned, and is maintained and restored by donations and through the work of the Bürgeln-Bund. Around the palace is an 80 m^{2} (860 ft^{2}) rose garden, with views of the French Vosges mountains, Basel, and the Sausenburg ruins.

Today, particularly in the summer, Schloss Bürgeln plays host to many events. These include conferences, seminars, concerts, and parties.

In the middle 1980s the palace was the filming location of a ZDF series entitled Lorenz & Söhne, which followed the story of the Lorenz family and their winery.

Wasserschloss Entenstein (Water Castle Entenstein)

The Wasserschloss Entenstein, in the center of the town of Schliengen, is a small moated castle, which today houses the city hall and the district administration offices. The black and yellow striped shutters are a traditional symbol warning passersby that the building has a moat. The surrounding castle park invites walkers in every season, and in the summer hosts several events, such as street and wine festivals.

Gasthaus Krone (Crown Inn) in Mauchen

The inn features a wall built of multicolored bottles.

=== Culinary specialties ===
The vineyards of Schliengen, like all of those in the Markgräflerland, grow a variety of good wines. The local vintner's cooperative, the Schliengener Winzergenossenschaft, is based in the town and offers wine tastings. The Weingut Lämmlin-Schindler in Mauchen was one of the first wineries to be established in Germany. The 1988/89 German Wine Princess, Petra Meyer, was from Schliengen.

== Economy and infrastructure ==
=== Transport ===
Schliengen is connected to the international rail network through the Rhine Valley Railway (Rheintalbahn)(Mannheim-Karlsruhe-Basel). The nearest large train stations are in Freiburg and Basel. Schliengen also lies on Federal Highway 3 (Bundesstraße 3), which gives direct access to the international highway network.

=== Local businesses ===
The Erste Markgräfler Winzergenossenschaft Schliengen-Müllheim e. G. (First Markgräfler Vintners' Cooperative) (www.sonnenstueck.de) is located in Schliengen, whose wines always place highly in regional and national competitions. The cooperative was founded in 1908 by the local priest, Leonhard Müller, together with 36 local vintners. Since 1971 it has shared the brand name "Sonnenstück" (a piece of the sun) with the municipalities in the region.

=== Education ===
The Hebelschule in Schliengen offers an Elementary school, a Hauptschule, and a vocational Realschule. There are also additional Elementary schools in Liel, Mauchen, and Niedereggenen.

== Personalities ==
=== Residents ===
- Lina Kromer (1889–1977; in Obereggenen), German poet.
