= Baroque fortifications in the Black Forest =

Forts in Germany

Coordinates: 47°41′57″N 7°56′56″E

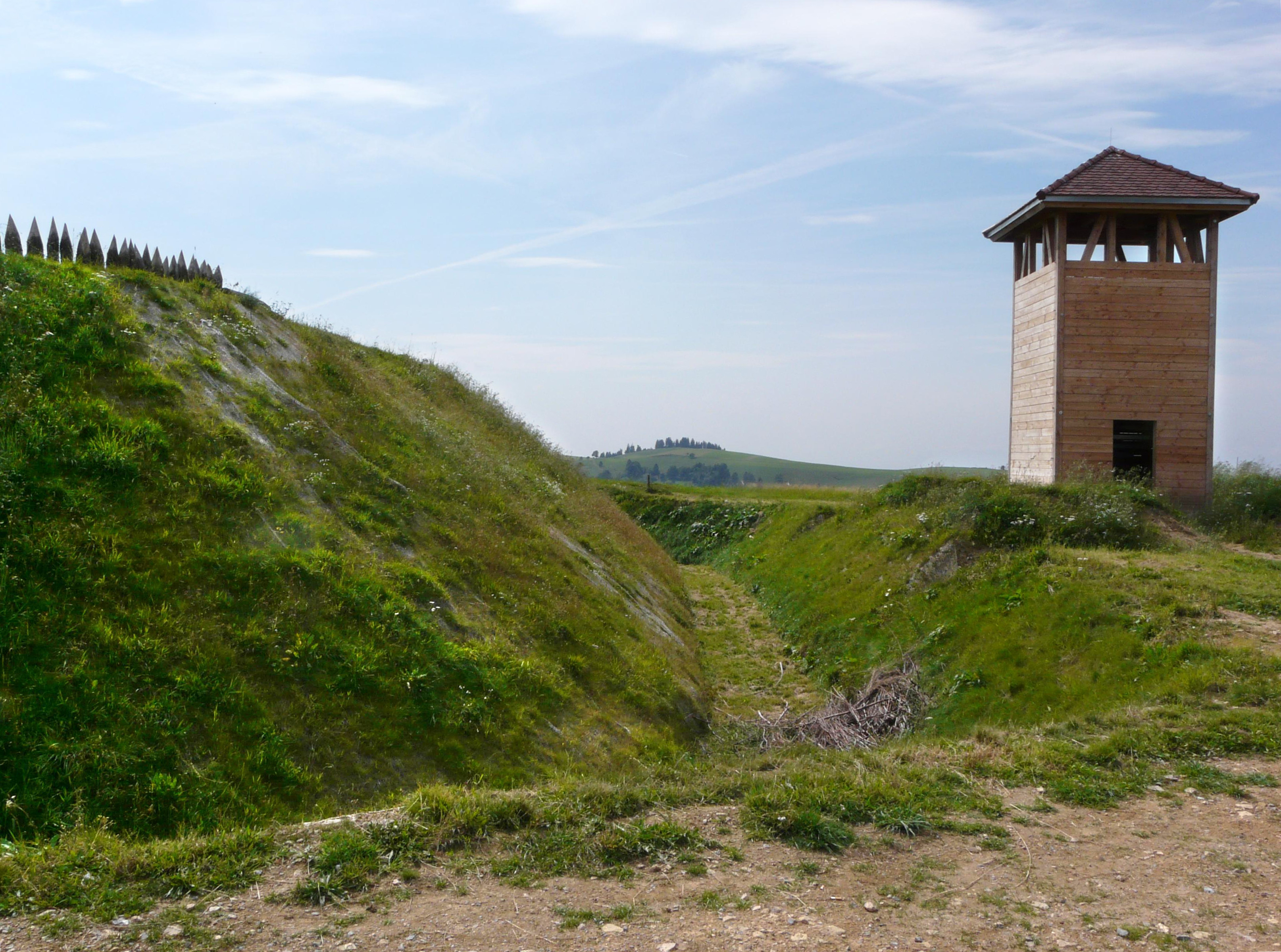
Reconstruction of a baroque schanze near Gersbach (Southern Black Forest)

The Baroque fortifications in the Black Forest (German: Barocke Verteidigungsanlagen im Schwarzwald), also called Baroque Schanzen (Barockschanzen) or Black Forest lines (Schwarzwaldlinien), are historical, military earthworks, known as schanzen, that were built in the Black Forest in what is now Germany. They were built in the 17th century to defend the Margraviate of Baden from French invasion. Together with their adjoining defensive lines, the Black Forest fortifications formed a defensive system over 200 kilometres (120 mi) long that ran from north to south.

== Construction ==
These defensive positions were built during the time of the conflicts between the House of Habsburg and the Kingdom of France in the 17th and 18th centuries, mainly during the War of the Palatine Succession and the War of the Spanish Succession. After the events of 1689 (including the destruction of Heidelberg Castle), Margrave Louis William of Baden-Baden (1655–1707), who was also known as "Turkish Louis" thanks to his distinguished service in the Great Turkish War, was given the imperial command of the defence of Germany against the advancing French. Between 1692 and 1701, the margrave had an extensive system of fortifications built on the Upper Rhine in the form of linked schanzen. These fixed defensive bulwarks built into the so-called "lines" of defence could be quickly enhanced by other earthworks. Several of the schanzen had already been built at the time of the Thirty Years' War or integrated even older, sometimes late medieval fortifications into their system. The positions were built by inhabitants of the local villages and towns who were forced to work on them; in later years soldiers were also used.

== Location and main sites ==
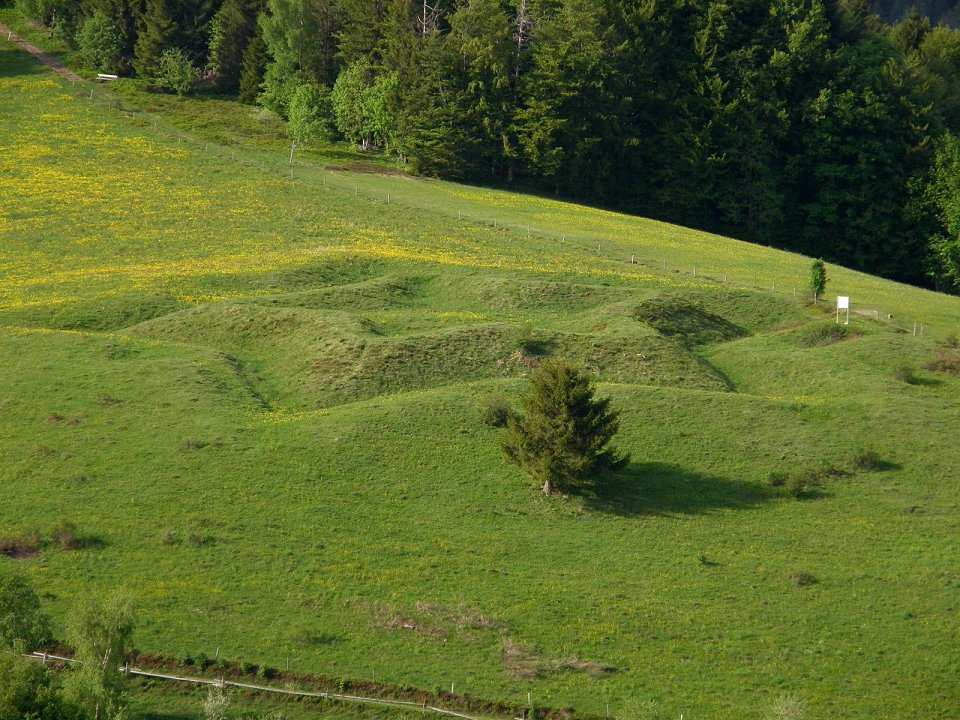
Star schanze at the Böllener Eck near Neuenweg

The extensive fortification system runs for over 200 kilometres (120 mi) through the Black Forest between the High Rhine in the south and Heidelberg in the north. Between Bad Säckingen and Feldberg the system is divided into an older "Rear Line" (Hintere Linie), which dates to the 1680s and 1690s, and a more recent "Forward Line" (Vordere Linie). Its beginning is marked by the Rothausschanze west of Murg, which was built during the Thirty Years' War. It was investigated archaeologically and geophysically in 2007 when the new A98 motorway was built. This showed that the redoubt was protected by a ditch, 8.3 metres (27 ft) wide and at least 3.6 metres (12 ft) deep. The defensive wall, with a thickness of about 2 metres (6.6 ft), was a dry stone wall set into the inner flanks of the ditch.

Especially well preserved are the works at the so-called Böllener Eck ("Böllen Corner") near Neuenweg, where there is a star schanze and a square redoubt that belong to the Forward Line. The defensive system is partly coextensive with the Landhag, a late medieval fortification. The five-pointed star schanze has a diameter of about 30 metres and ditches that are still about 2 to 3 metres (6 to 10 feet) deep today. The square redoubt has sides 20 metres (66 ft) long. Between the two positions there are traces of a schanze line, that consists of a ditch and bank and which continues southwards. The epitaph of the schanze commandant, Johann Marckloffksy von Zabrak, who died in 1691, is on the eastern side of the church at Neuenweg.

The Schwedenschanze (Zuflucht) is located in Zuflucht, a village of the municipality Bad Peterstal-Griesbach. It was built during the Thirty Years' War in 1632/1633. It consisted of a square with bulwarks at the corners and was designed for a crew of 400 to 500 men.

Another important defensive line exists in the Wagensteig valley near Kirchzarten where, in the late 17th century, a system of redoubts, banks and ditches was built. It starts above the Höllental valley and finishes in the north near the Hohle Graben. In 1690 fighting is recorded near Breitnau, but by the early 18th century most positions had lost their military importance. The northern site at the Hohle Graben is the largest schanze of the whole defensive system and was built before 1638. In 1679 over 4,000 men were garrisoned here and in the years that followed there were numerous isolated battles. 1734 is the year when the last construction work on the schanze is documented; its military significance came to an end after the last battle in 1796.

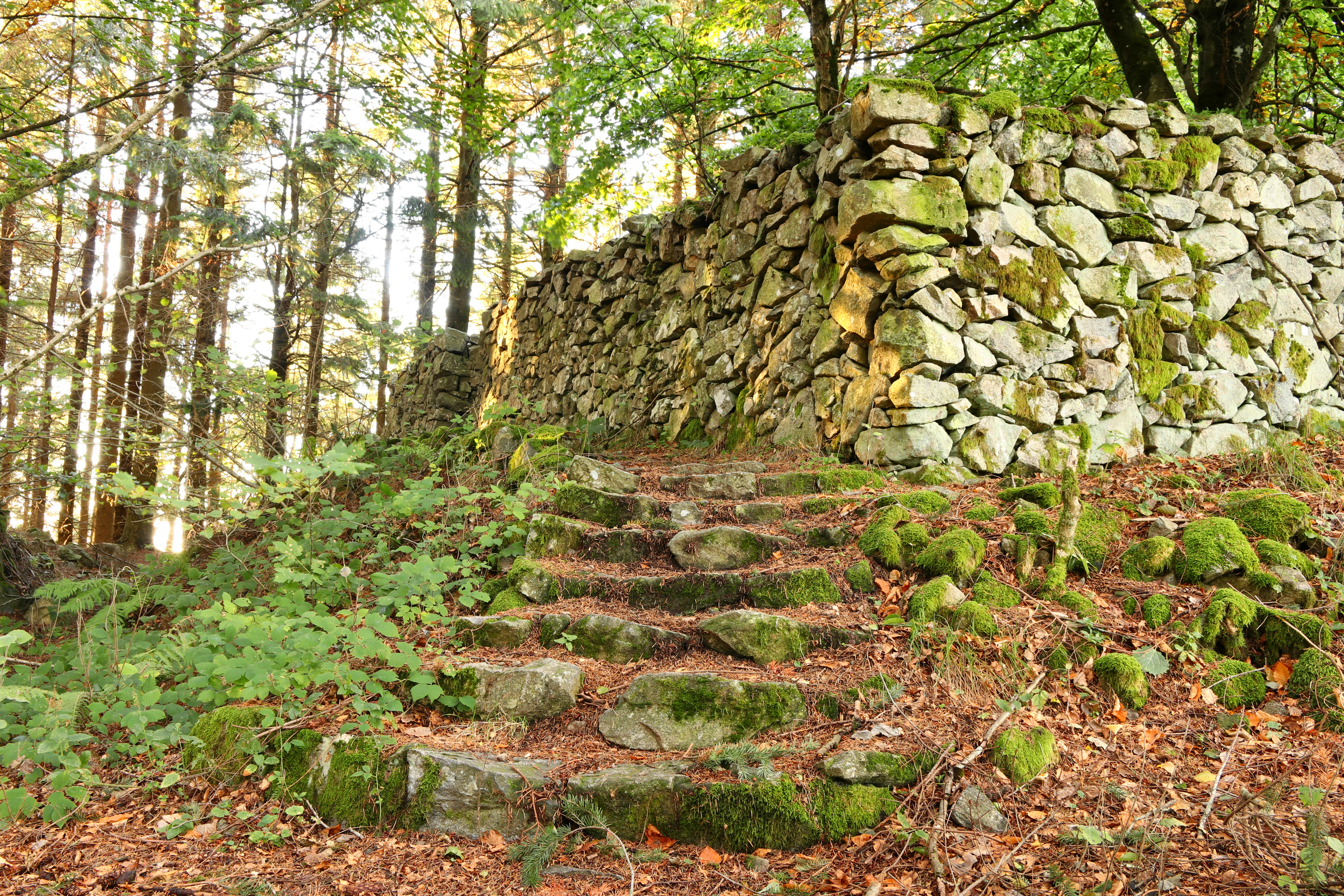
Baroque Schanze at the Höchst near Oberprechtal

Another important route across the Black Forest runs through the Kinzig valley, which is why there are numerous schanze positions here. Several sites are located near the Kinzig, others protect by roads. On the watershed between the Elz and Gutach is a fortification system that was built to guard the crossing to Hornberg. The line starts west of the Rensberg and continues over the Schnallenkopf and the Ziegelkopf eastwards to Hornberg. Another line runs over the Horniskopf and the Höchst to the Scheibeneck and guarded the road from Oberprechtal to Gutach im Breisgau, where the L107 runs today.

In the north the Black Forest lines link up with the Eppingen lines that stretch from Pforzheim to Neckargemünd and were built between 1695 and 1697. After the construction of the French fortress of Fort Louis on the Rhine north of Strasbourg towards the end of the 17th century, Louis William had the Bühl-Stollhofen Line built which ran from the fort through the Baden Rhine Plain to the Black Forest and, following its destruction in 1707, was replaced by the Ettlingen Line.

== Development and inventorying ==
Until 2002, only about six to eight schanzen positions were known and documented in the literature. Thanks to the work of the firm of AG Minifossi at the Friedrich Ebert School in Schopfheim other schanzen were discovered so that, today, over 100 sites are known. As part of its activities the project also supported the reconstruction of the schanze of Gersbach-Mettlen, where the Forward and Rear Lines divide. This reconstruction was opened on 21 May 2008 and is freely accessible. Around Gersbach the roughly 10-kilometre-long (6-mile-long) Schanzenweg footpath runs past several of the defensive works. The historical schanzen are still recognisable in places in the terrain; in other places they are only known from archaeological traces. The inventorying of the numerous works is under way.

== See also ==
- Schwedenschanze (Zuflucht)

== Literature ==
- Werner Störk: Die Barockschanzen des Türkenlouis im südlichen Schwarzwald. In: Jahrbuch (der Stadt Schopfheim) 19, 2004, ISSN 0930-3146, pp. 68–77.
- Werner Störk: Fortifikation im Barock: Die Schanzen des "Türkenlouis" im Südschwarzwald. In: Das Markgräflerland., 2009 Vol. 1, pp. 13–80
- Werner Störk: Die Sternschanze auf dem „Hau“ bei Neuenweg – eine absolute Rarität. In: Das Markgräflerland, Vol. 2014, pp. 76–84
- Harald Klemm: Werkbericht zur Umsetzung des Schanzenprojektes. In: Das Markgräflerland., 2009, Vol. 1, pp. 81–88
- Karl Seith: Linien und Schanzen im südlichen Schwarzwald. Ein Beitrag zu den Schwarzwaldbefestigungen des 17. und 18. Jahrhunderts. In: Das Markgräflerland 6, 1935, ZDB-ID 207910-0, pp. 23–24.
- Wilhelm Winterer: Die Entstehung und Verwertung der Schanzen und Linien auf dem südlichen Schwarzwalde, unter besonderer Berücksichtigung des Hohlen Grabens. Caritas, Freiburg i. Br., 1915, (Freiburg i.B., Univ., Diss., 1915).
- Andreas Haasis-Berner, Johannes Lauber, Ute Seidel: Barocke Schanzen im Schwarzwald. Die Verteidigungsanlagen auf den Schwarzwaldhöhen. In: Denkmalpflege in Baden-Württemberg. Nachrichtenblatt der Landesdenkmalpflege, 39th annual, 1/2010, pp. 26–30. (Online version, pdf, 5 MB) * Ernst Boesser: Zur Geschichte der Schwarzwaldlinien. In: Alemannia, New series, 5th vol., Freiburg im Breisgau, 1904, pp. 223–240 and 292–298 online at Commons
- Thomas Kopp: Der Schwarzwaldwanderer stößt auf Schanzen. In: Badische Heimat, Vol. 53 (1973), pp.56–72 online pdf 1.41 MB
