= Buggingen =

- Municipality
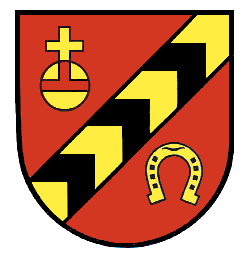
- Coat of arms

- Location of Buggingen within Breisgau-Hochschwarzwald district
- Interactive map of Buggingen
- Location within Germany Location within Baden-Württemberg
- Coordinates: 47°50′53″N 7°38′13″E
- Country: Germany
- State: Baden-Württemberg
- Admin. region: Freiburg
- District: Breisgau-Hochschwarzwald
- Subdivisions: 2

Government
  - Mayor (2022–30): Johannes Ackermann

Area
  - Total: 15.32 km^{2} (5.92 sq mi)
- Elevation: 239 m (784 ft)

Population (2025-12-31)
  - Total: 4,439
  - Density: 289.8/km^{2} (750.5/sq mi)
- Time zone: UTC+01:00 (CET)
  - Summer (DST): UTC+02:00 (CEST)
- Postal codes: 79426
- Dialling codes: 07631 Buggingen, 07634 Seefelden
- Vehicle registration: FR
- Website: buggingen.de

Buggingen is a municipality in the district of Breisgau-Hochschwarzwald in Baden-Württemberg in southern Germany located between the Rhine Valley and the Black Forest on the northern edge of Markgräflerland.

Buggingen lies in the western part of the pre-Black Forest mountains.

It is home to many vineyards and is a largely agricultural center. It also is home to Germany's largest tech mail order company. Buggingen administratively also includes Seefelden and Betberg, which is the site of a Protestant retreat centre.

== History ==
The village was first referred to in 778. It was mentioned in the "Urkundebuch" of the monastery of Lorsch as "Buchinger marca". In 940 the village shifted to the control of the Bishop of Constance.

As far as can be ascertained, Buggingen has been associated with vineyards throughout its history. The settlement of Buggingen has its origins in the alemannische. As a number of documents confirm, the majority of the property was in the hands of the church. Property owners were the monasteries in Lorsch, St. Blasien, Tennenbach, St. Peter, St. Trudpert, Sulzburg, Kappel, Neuenburg, Adelhausen, Sitzenkirch und Sölden.

In 1934, 86 people were killed in an accident at a salt mine near Buggingen. The site of the mine, which was opened in 1904 and closed in 1973, is now a museum.

== Business ==
Perhaps the largest business in the town is a computer mail order catalog company called, Pearl, which also has an outlet store in Auggen.
