= Eppingen lines =

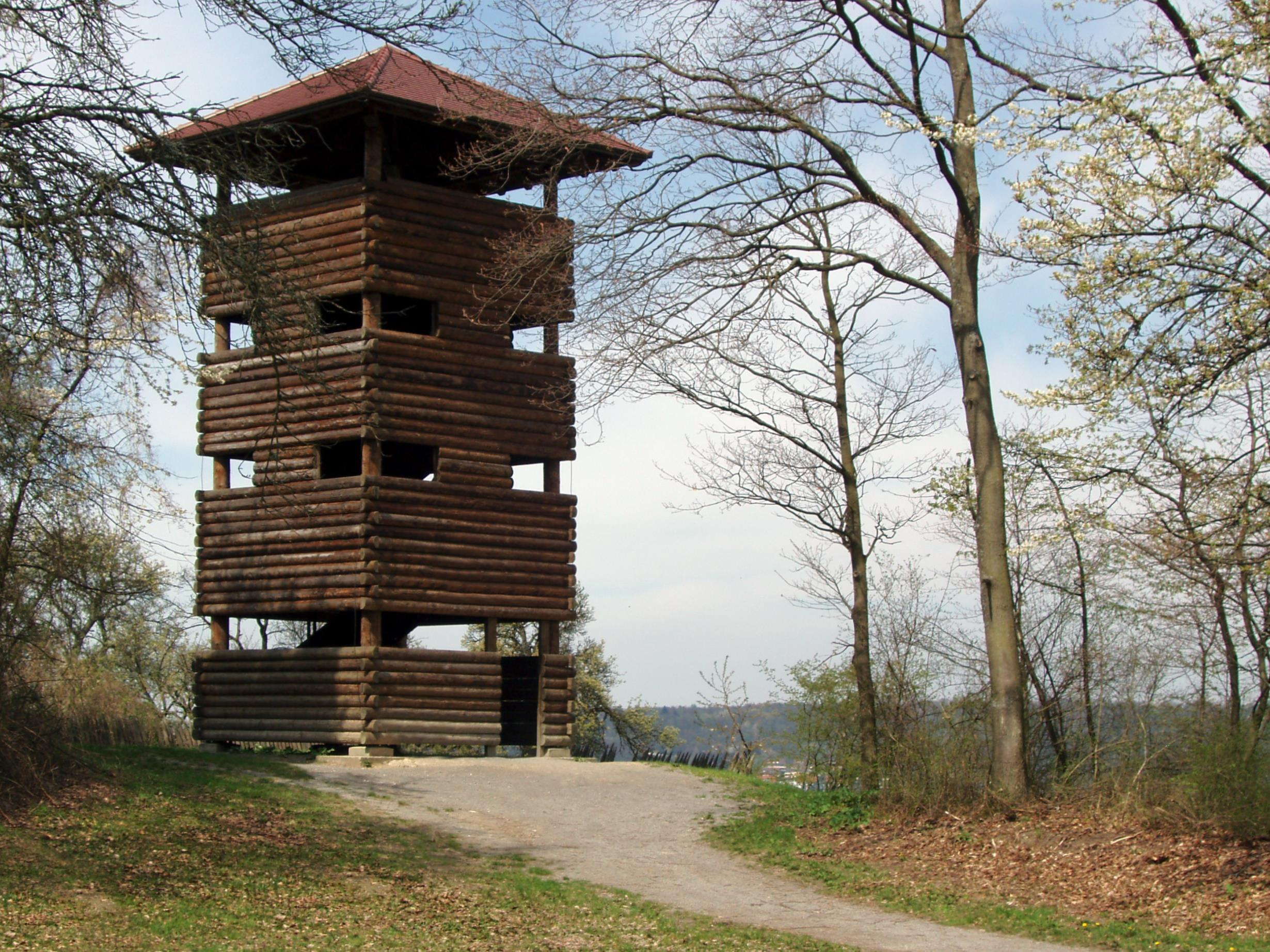
This replica of a chartaque may be seen on the southern edge of the village of Niefern-Öschelbronn.

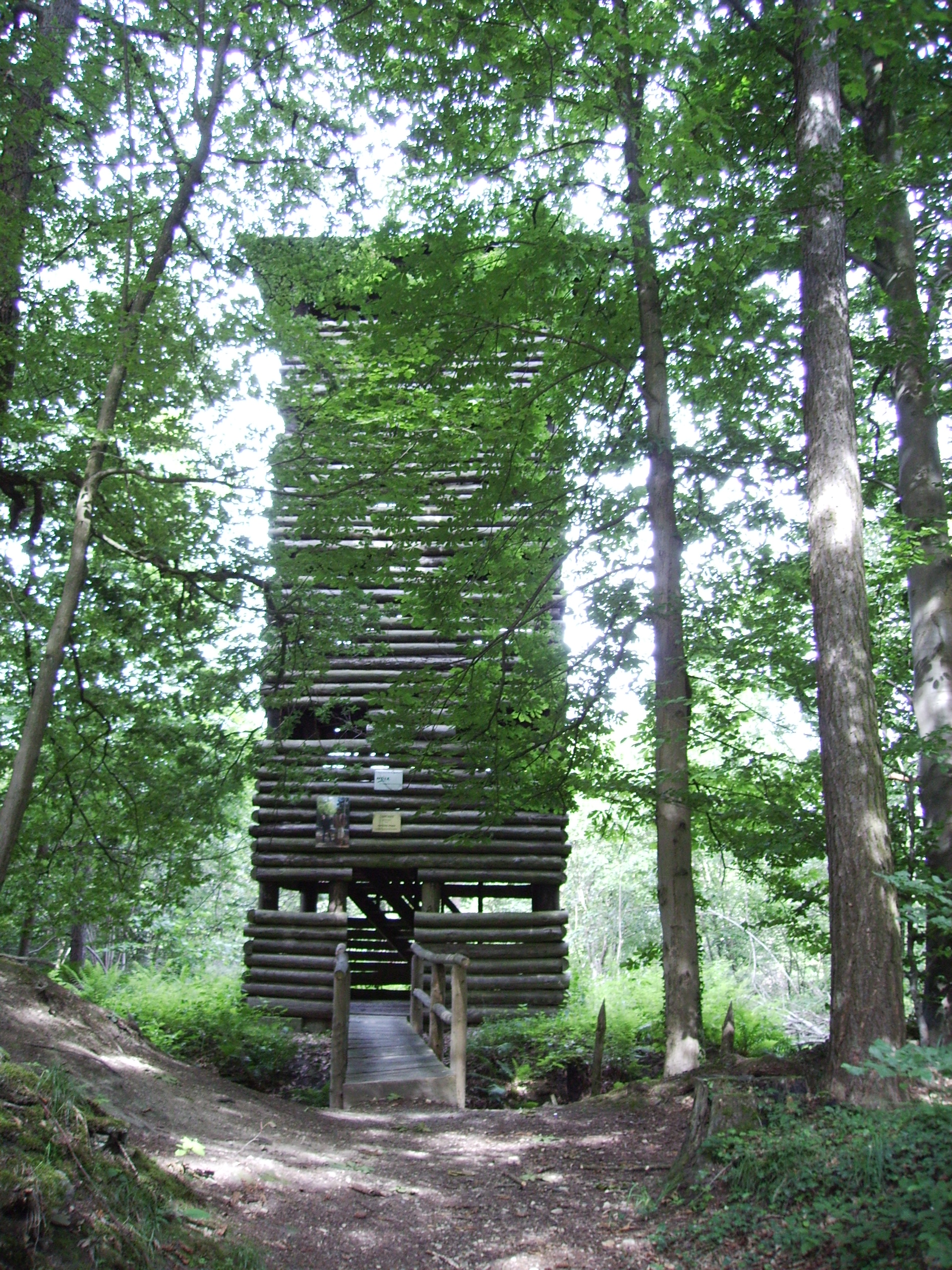
A chartaque in Eppingen.

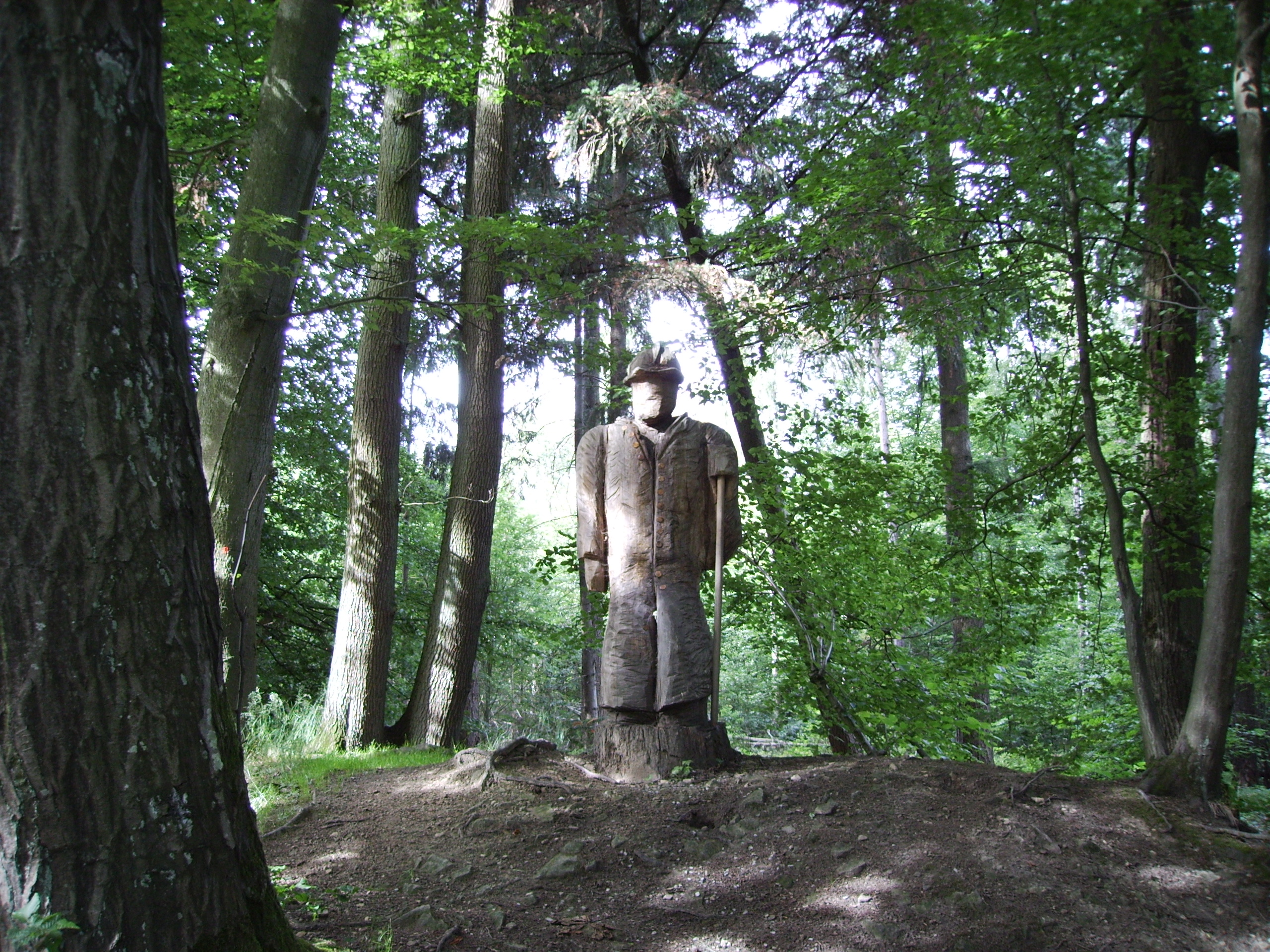
A carved wooden watchkeeper near the entrance to the Eppingen chartaque.

The Eppingen lines (German: Eppinger Linien) were a fortified defensive line, which stretched from Weißenstein near Pforzheim via Mühlacker, Sternenfels, Eppingen to Neckargemünd in southern Germany. It had a total length of 86 kilometres.

== Purpose ==
The French king, Louis XIV. (the "Sun King") made claims to the inheritance of Liselotte of the Palatinate (Elizabeth Charlotte). She had married Duke Philip of Orleans, the brother of Louis XIV. This conflict resulted in the War of the Palatine Succession. The Eppingen lines were built between 1695 and 1697 under Margrave Louis William of Baden, also known as "Turkish Louis", using socage labour, in order to prevent French raids during the Palatine succession crisis (1688–1697). Louis William of Baden understood the geographical advantage and the need for a state line of defence (Landesdefensionslinie). The location of the Eppingen lines had the benefit that the terrain could be held even against a stronger enemy.

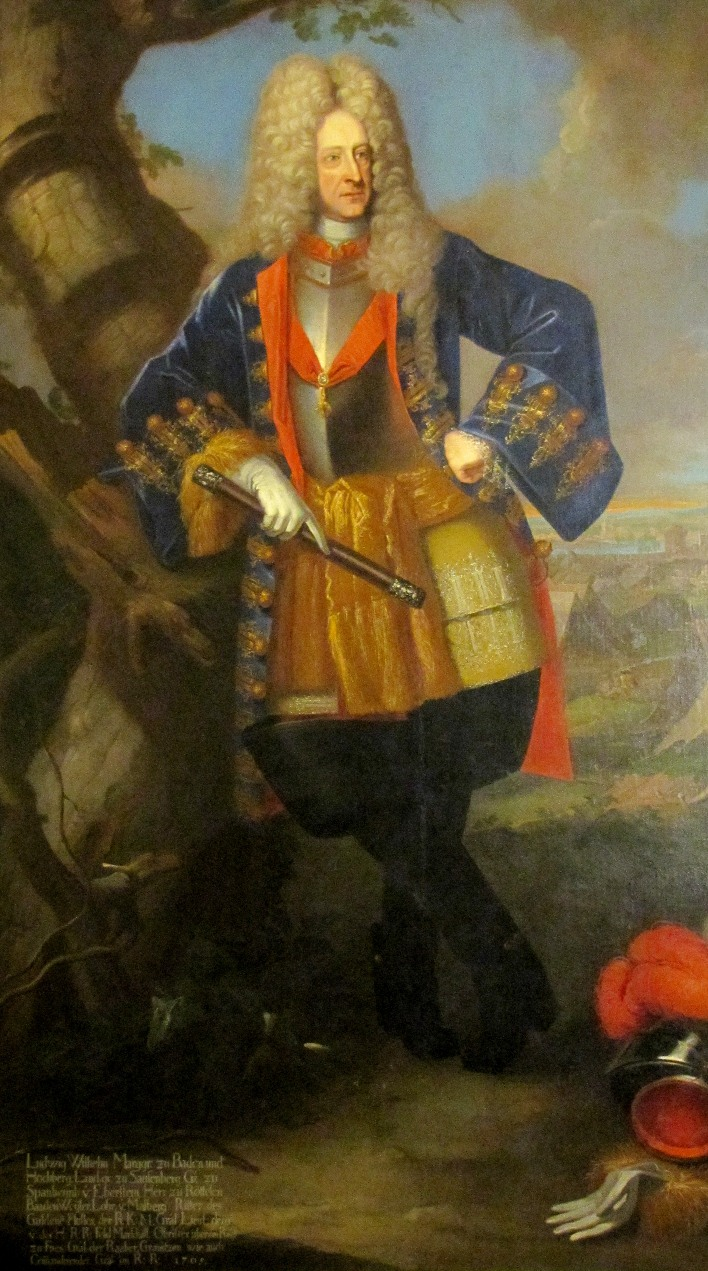
"Turkish Louis"

Louis XIV, the "Sun King"

== Design ==
The bulwark consisted of a roughly 40-metre-wide Verhack, an abatis of branches and logs that was followed by a roughly 2.5-metre-deep ditch. The spoil from the ditch was used to build a rampart behind the ditch. The ditch and bank system of the Eppingen lines was guarded by watchtowers, called chartaques. A chartaque was a tower-like blockhouse with a plan measuring 6×6m and a height of about 12 metres.

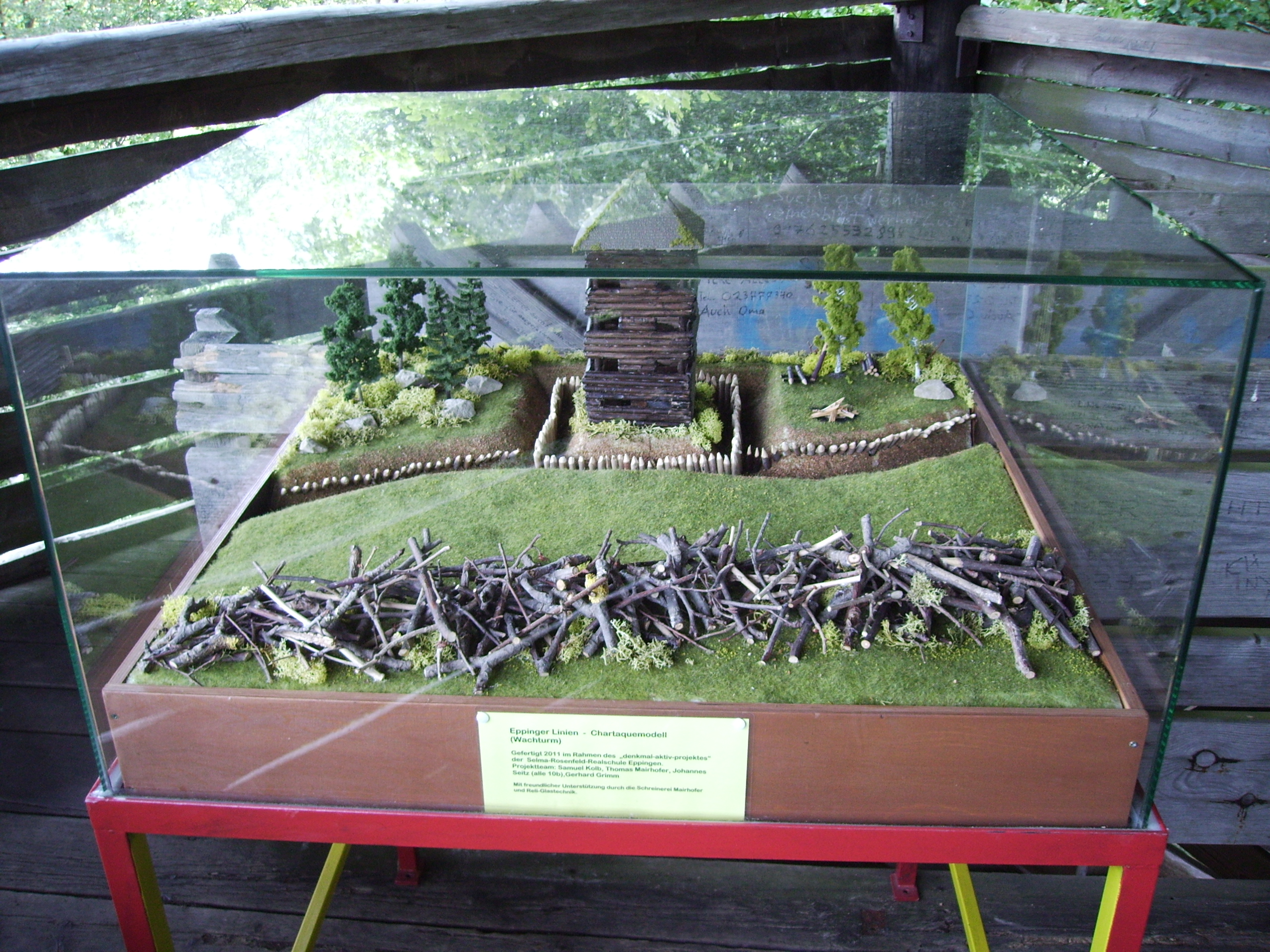
Model of the original fortifications

== Situation of the civilian population ==
Civilians from Durlach and Baden were forced to work on the construction of the defences. These so-called schanzers came from the area in front of the Eppingen lines and were thus at the mercy of French forces. The French army threatened to raze villages if schanzen were built. The German generals, for their part, threatened executions if the population did not assist with building the defences. Thus the people who lived in front of the lines often had to suffer twice as much.

== Modern day reconstructions ==
Examples of the typical wooden watchtowers have been reconstructed and may be seen today at Eppingen (49°6′40″N 8°56′26″E) and Mühlacker (48°58′08″N 8°49′54″E). In 1988 a 12.5-metre-high wooden observation tower was built at the Waldschanz south of Niefern-Öschelbronn near 48°54′16″N 8°46′55.5″E.

In the south, near Pforzheim, the line is linked to the Black Forest lines.

The Eppingen Lines Way (Eppinger-Linien-Weg), a footpath, runs along the course of the defensive lines and through parts of the Stromberg-Heuchelberg Nature Park. It has display boards with information about the historic monument. The way is marked with a stylised symbol of a chartaque.

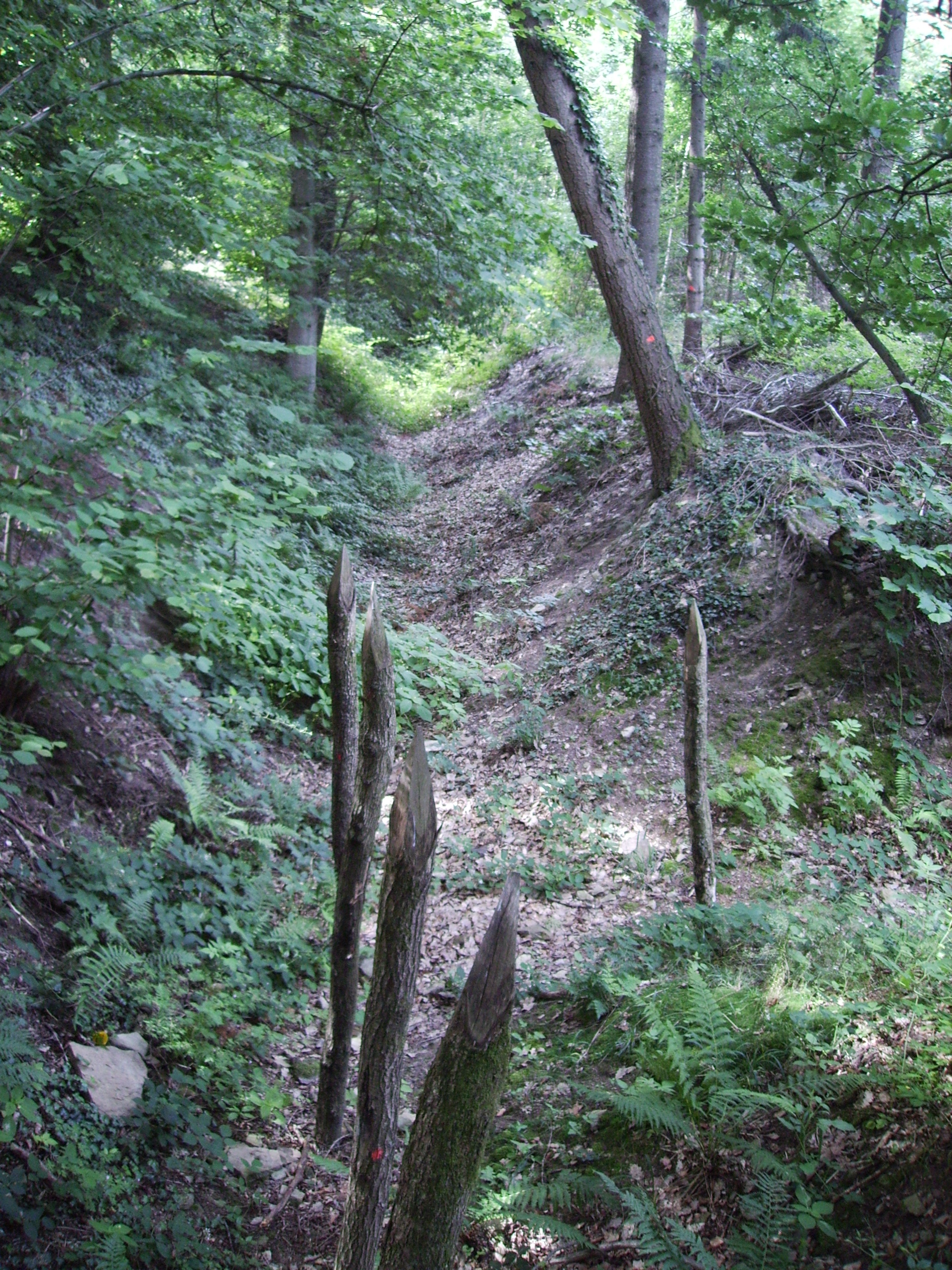
Remains of the old ditch and rampart

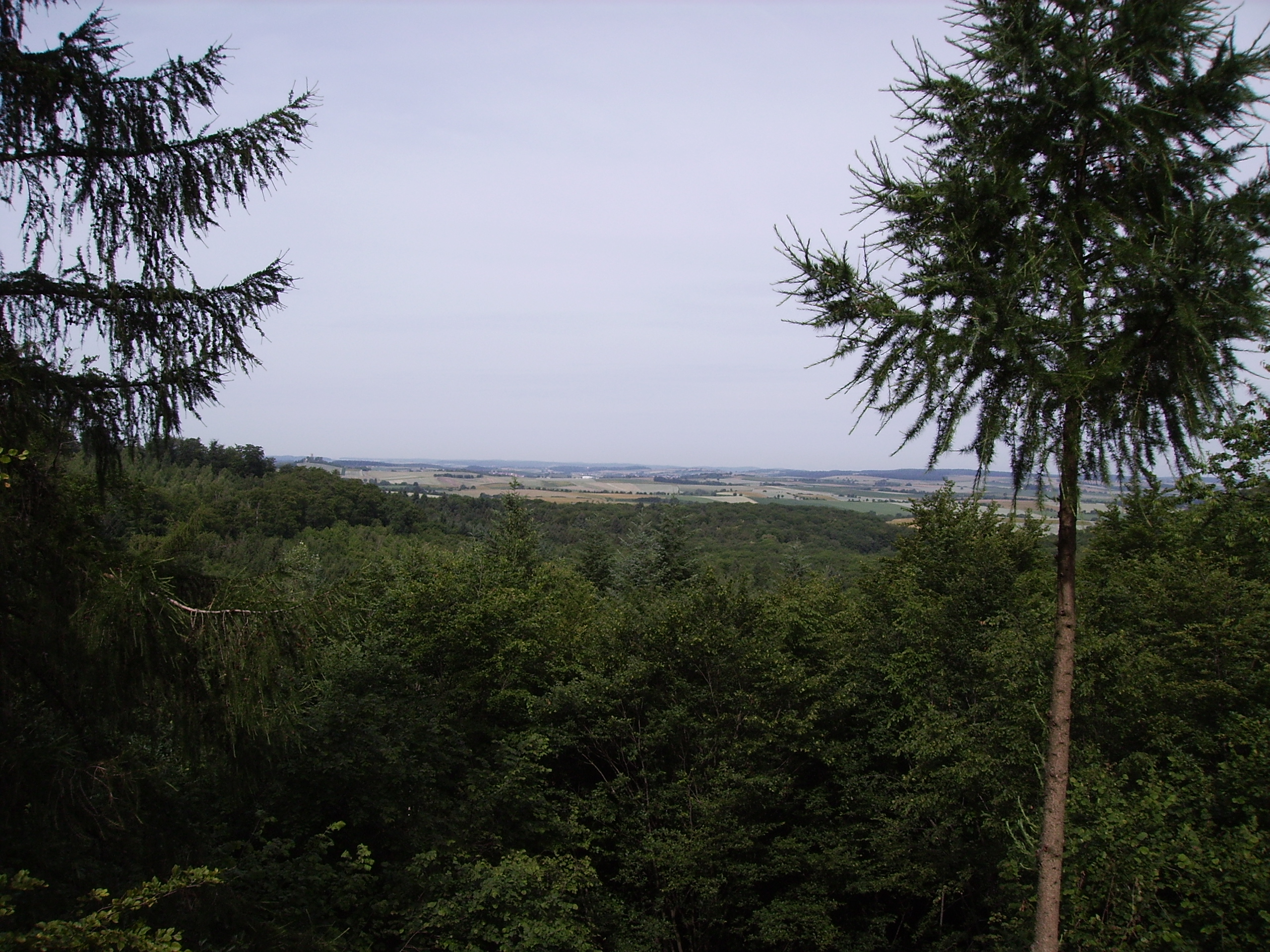
View from the Eppingen chartaque looking west.

== See also ==
- Baroque fortifications in the Black Forest
- Bühl-Stollhofen Line
- Ettlingen Line

== Literature ==
- Rudolf Groll: Der Orleanische Krieg und die Zerstörung Brettens 1689. In. Brettener Jahrbuch für Kultur und Geschichte 1960, Bretten 1960, S. 9-29 (S. 20-25: Eppinger Linien)
- Gerhard Weber: Die Eppinger Linie, Kraichgau - Heimatforschung im Landkreis Sinsheim, 1979
- Heimatfreunde Eppingen: Rund um den Ottilienberg, Band 6, 1994, ISBN 3 - 930172 - 11 - 9
