= Lines of Stollhofen =

German defensive line built during the War of the Spanish Succession

The Lines of Stollhofen (German: Bühl-Stollhofener Linie) was a line of defensive earthworks built for the Reichsarmee at the start of the War of the Spanish Succession (1701–1714) running for about 15 kilometres (9.3 mi) from Stollhofen on the Rhine to the impenetrable woods on the hills east of Bühl.

The lines were constructed by order of Margrave Louis William I of Baden-Baden in order to protect northern Baden from the newly erected French fortress of Fort Louis on the River Rhine.

== Location ==
The roughly 15 kilometres (9.3 mi) long and only partly fortified line started in the east near Obertal (today part of Bühlertal), ran westwards over the heights to Bühl and then northwest in the Rhine valley via Vimbuch (today a village in the municipality of Bühl), Leiberstung (today part of Sinzheim) and Stollhofen to the River Rhine. It comprised linear schanzen in the terrain, as well as individual star schanzen, hornworks, small forts and fortified villages, and used the watercourses on the Rhine Plain in order to flood the fields of fire and approach using weirs.

At the same time, by including the villages of Bühl and Stollhofen, it enabled control of the old trade routes from Basle to Frankfurt (today the Bundesstraße B3) at Bühl, and from Strasbourg to Frankfurt (old Roman road, today the B 36). Until 1707, the line bounded the operational area of the French troops and barred the easiest route to Bavaria via Pforzheim.

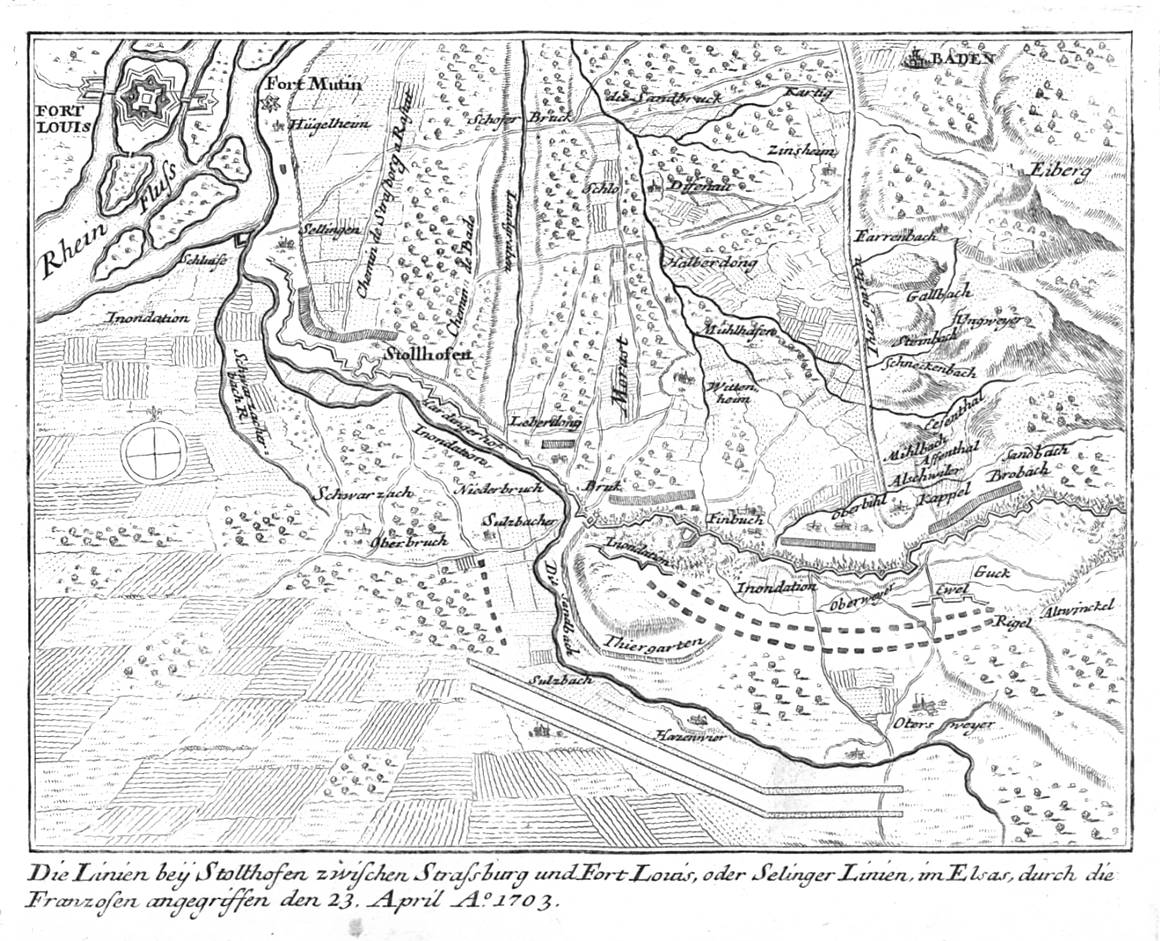
1720 plan of the whole line

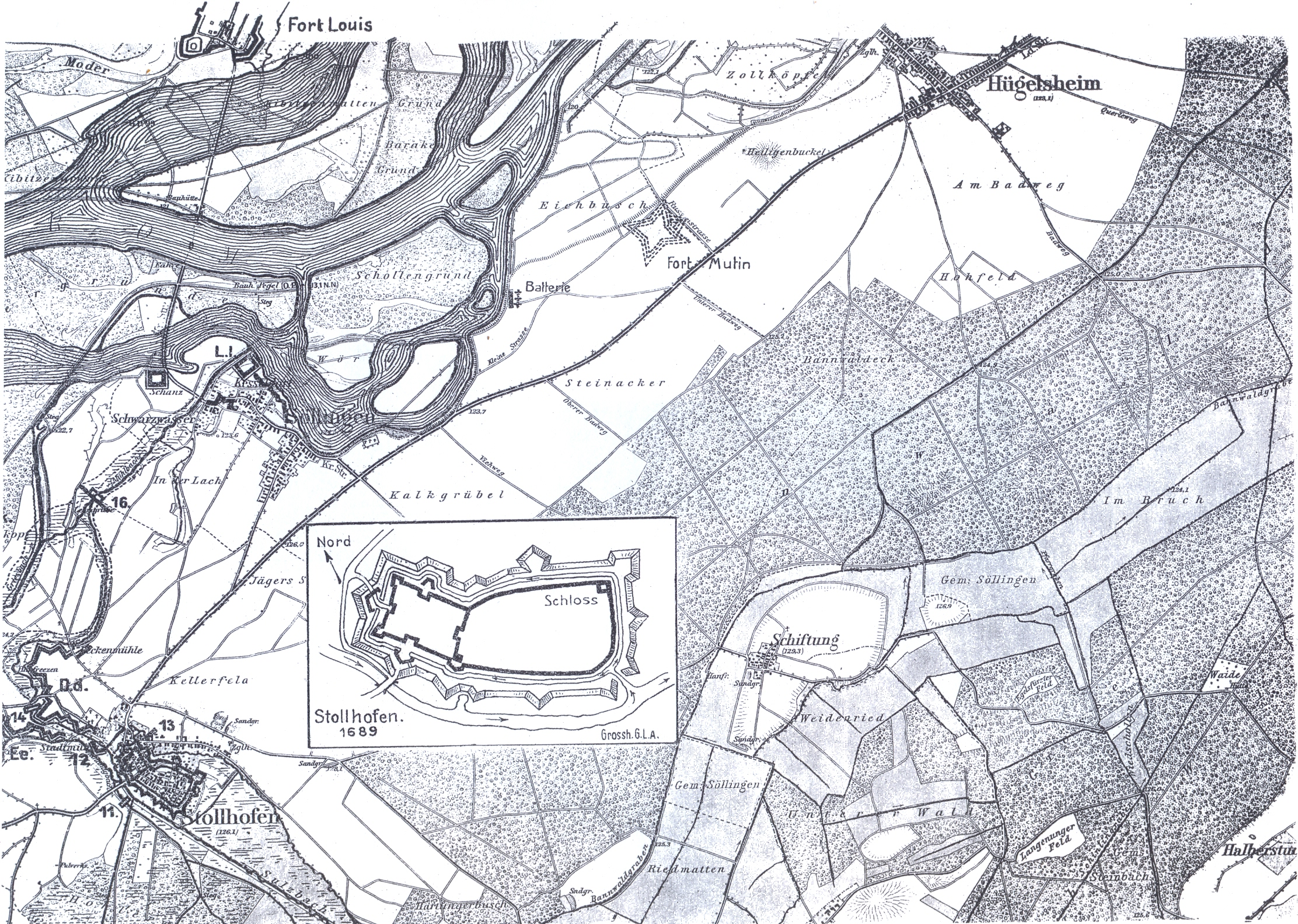
Northern section

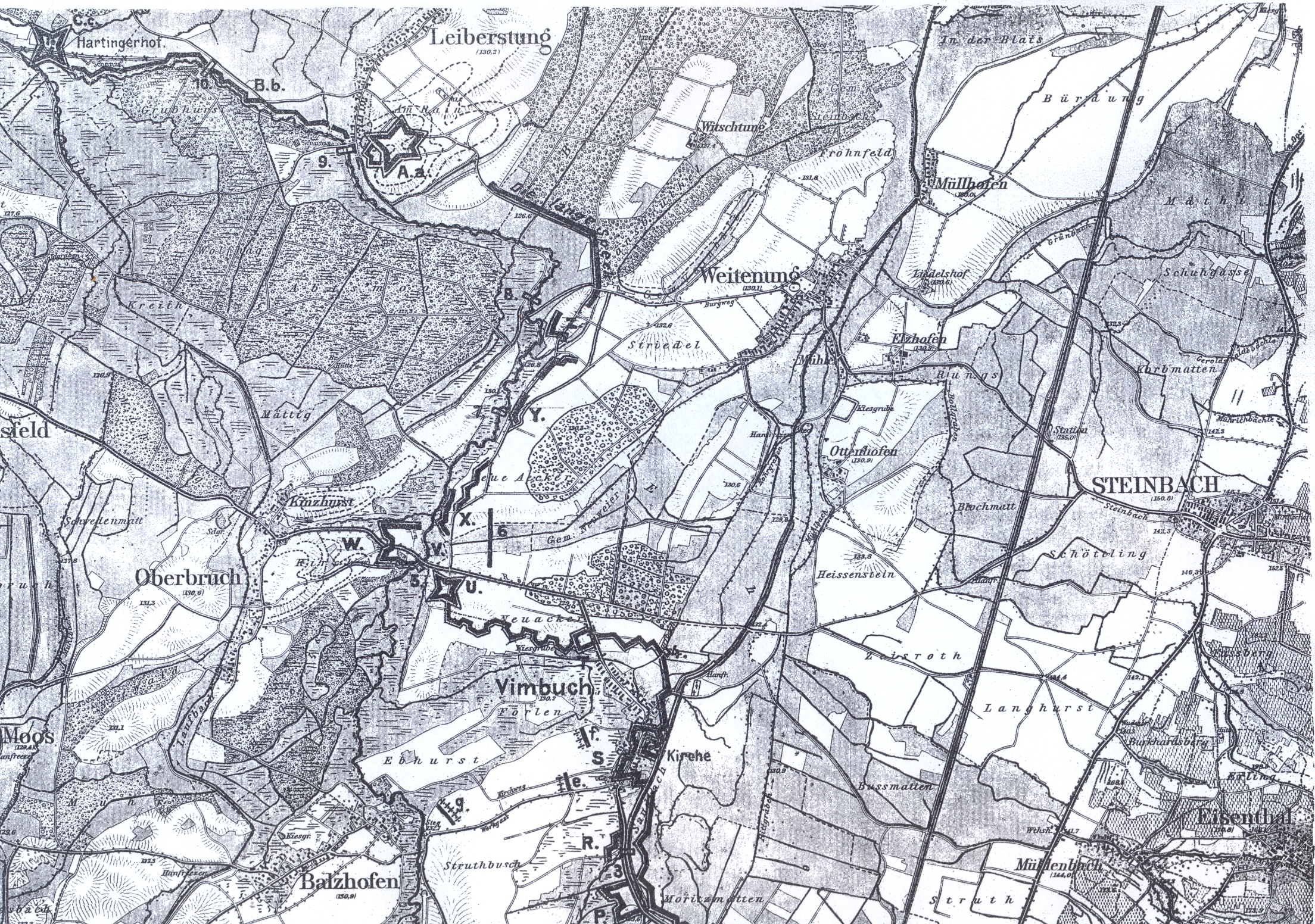
Central section

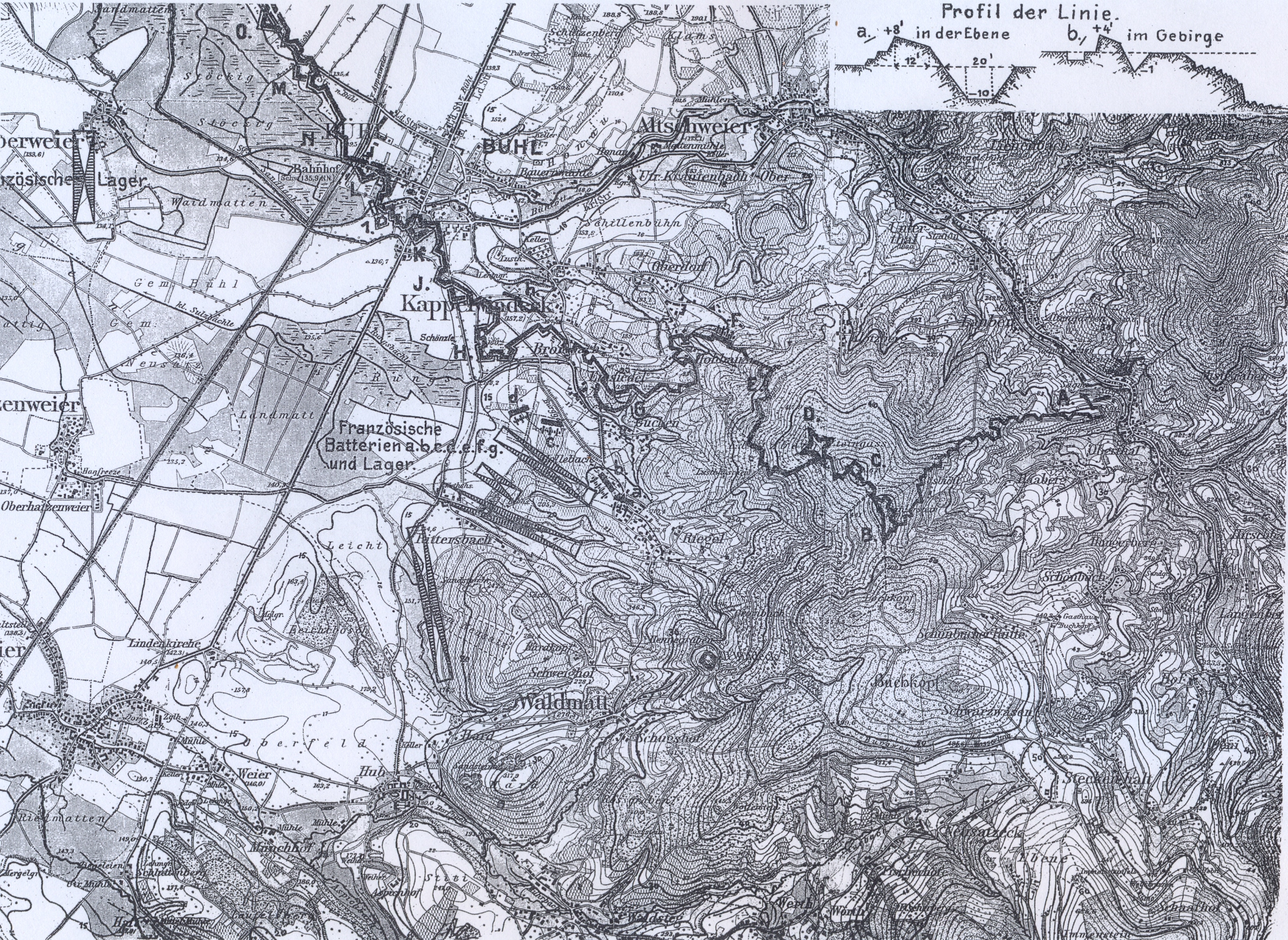
Southern section

== History ==
Following his Rhine crossing in mid-February 1703, Marshal Villars found the passes through the Black Forest to be still impassible because of snow. Therefore, he initially occupied Kehl Fortress on 12 March as his base east of the Rhine, united with the army of Marshal Tallard, and on 19 April 1703 began an attack on the Bühl-Stollhofen Line. He bombarded the line south of Kappelwindeck and tried to bypass the line to the east with 25 battalions under Blainville. Both attempts, on 19 and 24 April, failed because the French could not capture the fortifications at Obertal. On 25 April, Villars pulled back.

In summer 1703, however, Margrave Louis William could not stop Villars marching up the Kinzig valley and on into Bavaria. There, Villars was victorious in the First Battle of Höchstädt. Likewise in 1704, Tallar passed through the Black Forest unhindered along the Dreisam Valley.

After the death of Margrave Louis William (9 January 1707), Villars captured the Bühl-Stollhofen Line in May without a fight and had it destroyed.

Several months after the loss of the Bühl-Stollhofen Line, work began on the Ettlingen Line under the Rhine Army commander, George Louis of Brunswick-Lüneburg. The line was reinforced during the War of the Polish Succession (1733–1738), was destroyed by the French in 1734 broke and was rebuilt in 1735.

== Today ==
As a result of the canalization of the Rhine by Tulla in the 19th century and the construction of roads and settlements in the last century the remains of the line are now visible in places only in the wooded areas east of Bühl. In the Bühl Municipal Museum is the 1703 map of the Bühl-Stollhofen Line drawn by Major Elster.

== See also ==
- Baroque fortifications in the Black Forest
- Eppingen lines
- Johan Wijnand van Goor defended the lines in 1703
- Battle of Blenheim (August 1704) the lines played an important blocking role in the weeks before the battle
- Prince Eugene of Savoy commanded the forces on the line immediately before the Battle of Blenheim
- Marshall Villars (May 1707) attacked the lines with a holding operation and then outflanked them defeating Christian Ernst, Margrave of Brandenburg.
