= Kleines Wiesental =

- Municipality
- Coat of arms

- Location of Kleines Wiesental within Lörrach district
- Interactive map of Kleines Wiesental
- Location within Germany Location within Baden-Württemberg
- Coordinates: 47°43′11″N 07°47′40″E
- Country: Germany
- State: Baden-Württemberg
- Admin. region: Freiburg
- District: Lörrach

Government
  - Mayor (2017–25): Gerd Schönbett

Area
  - Total: 77.84 km^{2} (30.05 sq mi)

Population (2025-12-31)
  - Total: 2,943
  - Density: 37.81/km^{2} (97.92/sq mi)
- Time zone: UTC+01:00 (CET)
  - Summer (DST): UTC+02:00 (CEST)
- Postal codes: 79692
- Dialling codes: 07622, 07629, 07673
- Vehicle registration: LÖ

Kleines Wiesental is a municipality in the district of Lörrach in Baden-Württemberg, southwestern Germany. It was formed on 1 January 2009 by the merger of the former municipalities Bürchau, Elbenschwand, Neuenweg, Raich, Sallneck, Tegernau, Wies and Wieslet.

== Demographics ==
Population development:

Year	Inhabitants	% Deviation from previous year
2015	2,932	–
2016	2,865	– 2.29
2017	2,838	– 0.94
2018	2,869	1.09
2019	2,871	0.07
2020	2,850	– 0.73
