= Entenstein Castle =

Coordinates: 47°45′18″N 7°34′41″E

- Schloss Entenstein
- Part of Schliengen
- Germany
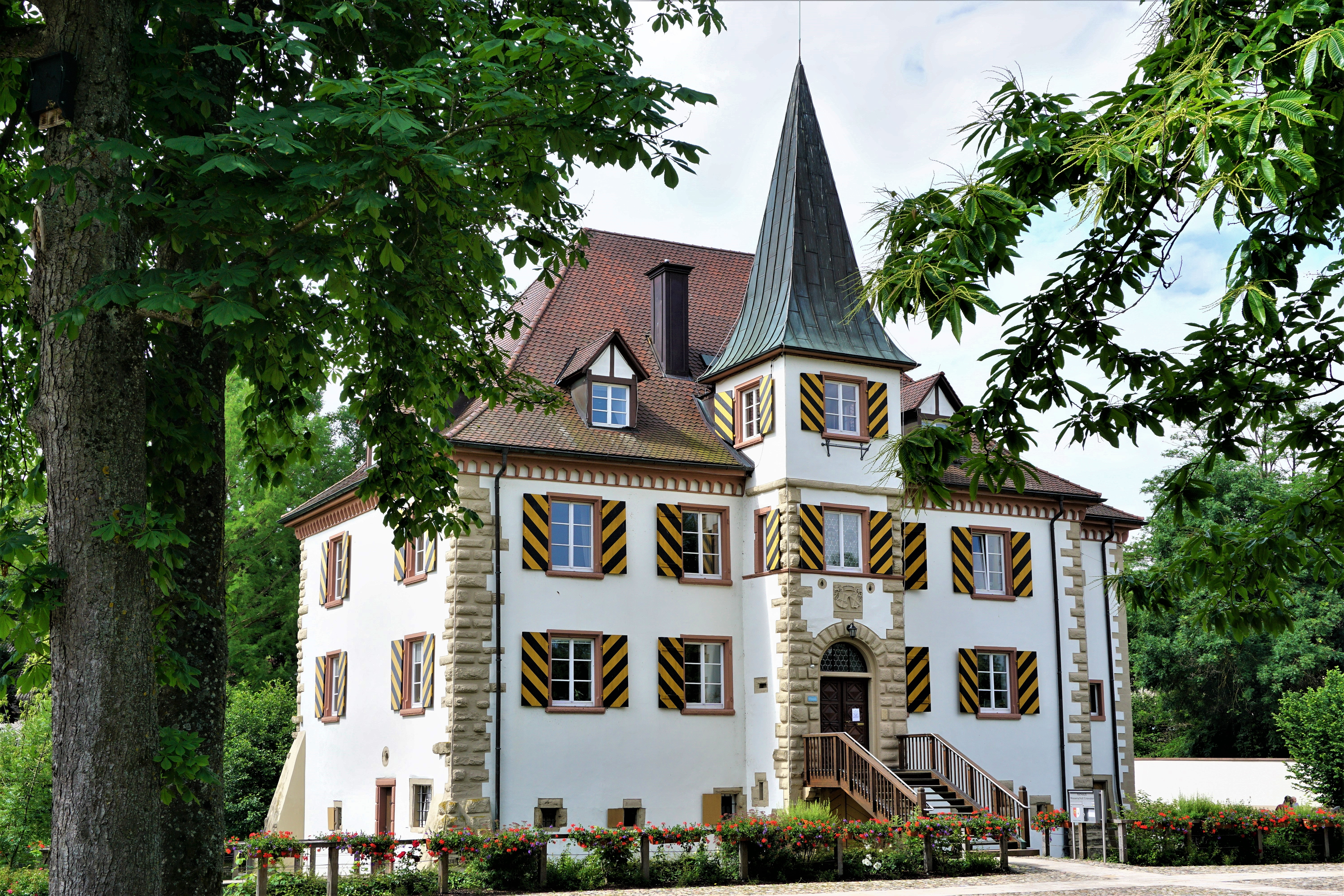
- Entenstein Castle from the north-east

Site information
- Owner: Community of Schliengen
- Condition: renovated

Entenstein Castle (German: Schloss Entenstein) is a medieval castle surrounded by a moat situated in the center of the town of Schliengen. Schliengen is located in the district of Lörrach, Baden-Württemberg, in the very south-west of Germany in the proximity of the Black Forrest.

The origins of the castle cannot be clearly dated. The first use of a building at this location can be traced to Walter of Schliengen in 821. By 1000 a tower house might have been in use. In the 13th century, Rudolf von Üsenberg (1207–1231) was the owner of the castle. The name of the castle derives from the German words "Ente" and "Stein", which means duck and stone. By 1525, Entenstein belonged to the nobles of Nagel von der Alten Schönstein and was thus transformed to a more representative manor house.

In 1725 Johann Conrad of Reinach-Hirtzbach, then Prince Bishop of Basel, bought Entenstein castle and used it as the seat of the Upper Bailiwick of Schliengen. In 1805, Entenstein Castle became a district site of the Grand Duchy of Baden. After 1857 Entenstein Castle which was then in the possession of the counts of Andlau, an old German noble house, was reconstructed.

In 1970 Entenstein Castle was purchased by the Community of Schliengen and renovated thereafter.
