= Dietrich Koger =

Mayor of Auggen, Holy Roman Empire

Honorable Dietrich Köger
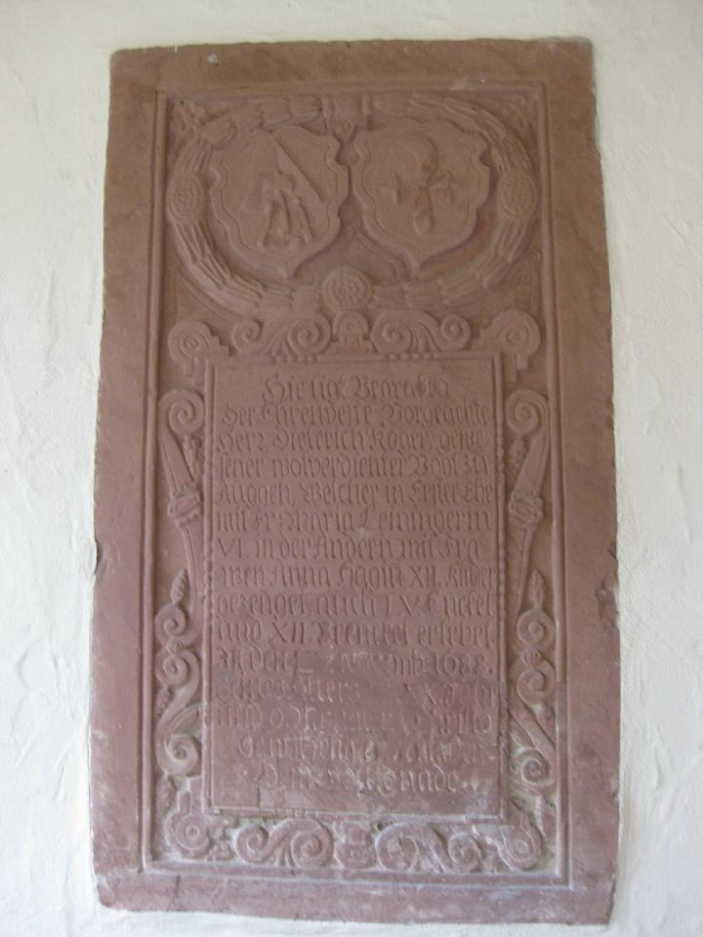
- Born: March 24, 1608; Weil am Rhein
- Died: November 27, 1688 (aged 80)
- Occupations: Magistrate, Mayor
- Years active: 1628–1688

Mayor of Auggen
- In office 1629–1661
- Preceded by: Hans Leininger

Dietrich Koger (24 March 1608 - 27 November 1688) was a magistrate who served as Mayor and Vogt of Auggen, Holy Roman Empire (present day Germany) from 1629 until 1661. Prior to 1629, Koger served as Sergeant-at-Arms of Weil am Rhein. Dietrich Koger is the son of magistrate, and former Vogt of Weil am Rhein, Nicholas 'Claus' Koger. Dietrich Koger was married twice, the first to Maria Leininger on 24 August 1629 - daughter of Hans Leininger, until her death on 30 April 1643 during pregnancy. Koger's second wife, Anna Hagin, was daughter of the Vogt of Tannenkirch, George Hagin. In the mid-seventeenth century, Koger became the first magistrate to affix a seal with his own crest and coat of arms depicting a plough and vine-knife. During the 30 Years War, Koger and Paster Jeremias Gmelin were credited with bringing peace to Auggen-Baden, and rebuilding the village. His epitaph on the West Cemetery Wall in Auggen still shows the arms and crest of Koger; Koger's coat of arms eventually was inspired and adopted as the town of Auggen's coat of arms. At the time of his death in 1688 Koger had 18 children. A street in Auggen, Germany still bears his name: Dietrich-Koger-Straβe, 79424 Auggen, Germany. Koger's tomb is located at St. Pankratiuskirche Cemetery, Auggen.
