= Ettlingen Line =

Defensive line built in 1707 during the War of the Spanish Succession

Coordinates: 48°58′57″N 8°20′42″E

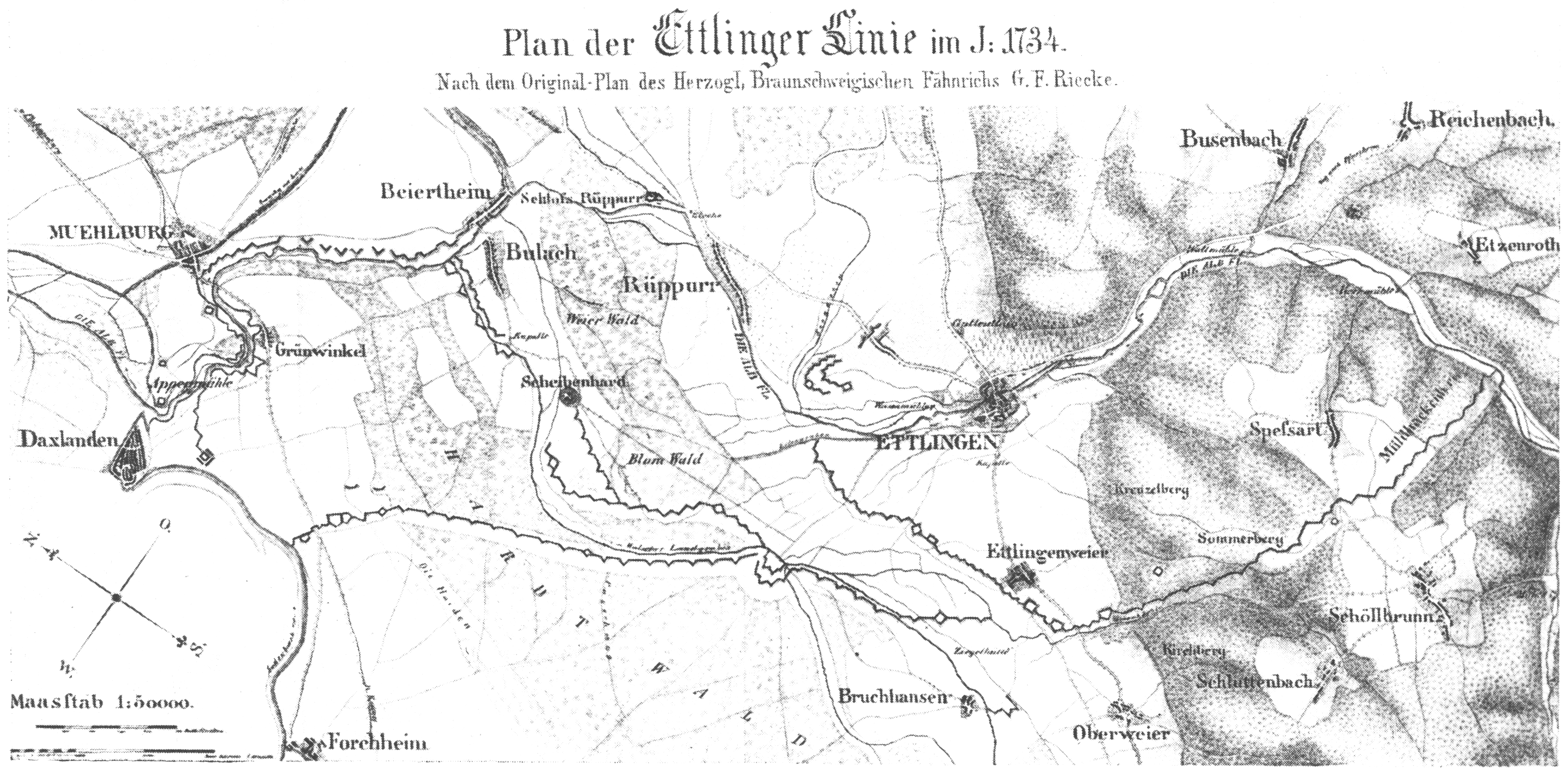
Northwestern part of the Ettlingen Line around 1734 from an 1857 plan

The Ettlingen Line (German: Ettlinger Linie) or Lower Line (Untere Linie) was a defensive line built in 1707 during the War of the Spanish Succession from brushwood (Verhauen) and palisades, which replaced the 1701 Bühl-Stollhofen Line after that had been destroyed in May 1707 and levelled by French troops.

== History ==
Several months after the loss of the Bühl-Stollhofen Line, work began on the Ettlingen Line on the orders of the commander of the Rhine Army, George Louis of Brunswick-Lüneburg. The line was reinforced during the War of the Polish Succession (1733–1738) by the introduction of watercourses that could be impounded, but in 1734 French troops broke through them and they were subsequently destroyed, but then rebuilt in 1735. Thereafter they lost their military significance.

== Location ==
The line, which flanks from the Malscher Landgraben, lies between the Black Forest and the Rhine meadows south of where the city of Karlsruhe is today. Remains of the fortified line with their breastworks and a redoubt may still be seen southwest of Karlsruhe near a heath settlement, running for a distance of around 500 metres in the forest of Hardtwald. In the woods of Rheinstetten, an even longer section of the line is still visible. Since July 2010 the line in Karlsruhe has been marked by an information board; another one has been erected in Rheinstetten on Pirschweg. There are also visible remains in Schöllbronn; together with a further information board.

== See also ==
- Baroque fortifications in the Black Forest
- Bühl-Stollhofen Line
- Eppingen lines

== Literature ==
- Wolfgang Lorch: Die Ettlinger Linien (Ettlinger Heimatblätter, Vol. 1)
- Wolfgang Lorch: Die "Ettlinger Linien", Ettlingen, 1983 (Ettlinger Unterrichtsblätter)
- Karl Lang: Die Ettlinger Linien und ihre Geschichte, Ettlingen: Selbstverlag der Stadt Ettlingen, 1965 (Beiträge zur Geschichte der Stadt Ettlingen, hrsg. von der Stadtgeschichtlichen Kommission der Stadt Ettlingen; 5)
- Volker Steck: Die Ettlinger Linien, Blick in die Geschichte No. 86 dated 19 March 2010 (online at karlsruhe.de)
