= Elbenschwand =

Former municipality in Baden-Württemberg, Germany

- Ortsteil of Kleines Wiesental
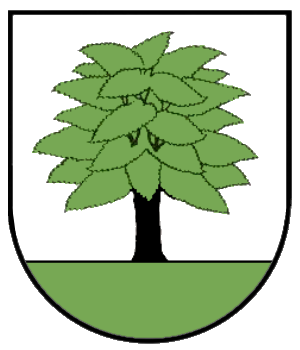
- Coat of arms
- Interactive map of Elbenschwand
- Location within Germany Location within Baden-Württemberg
- Coordinates: 47°44′44″N 07°50′09″E
- Country: Germany
- State: Baden-Württemberg
- Admin. region: Freiburg
- District: Lörrach
- Town: Kleines Wiesental

Area
  - Total: 6.76 km^{2} (2.61 sq mi)
- Elevation: 789 m (2,589 ft)

Population (2006-12-31)
  - Total: 164
  - Density: 24.3/km^{2} (62.8/sq mi)
- Time zone: UTC+01:00 (CET)
  - Summer (DST): UTC+02:00 (CEST)
- Postal codes: 79692
- Dialling codes: 07629
- Vehicle registration: LÖ

Elbenschwand is a village and a former municipality in the district of Lörrach in Baden-Württemberg, Germany. Since 1 January 2009, it is part of the municipality Kleines Wiesental.

In the area of the Elbenschwand district are the villages of Elbenschwand, Holl and Langensee and the small group of houses Buck. Holl and Langensee are located in the valley of the Little Meadow, while Elbenschwand is located on the mountain.

== Geography ==
Elbenschwand is located in the Southern Black Forest Nature Park in the valley of the Little Meadow. Forests occupy 72% of the previous district's district. Its average elevation is 789 meters above the sea level.
