= Müllheim im Markgräflerland =

- Town
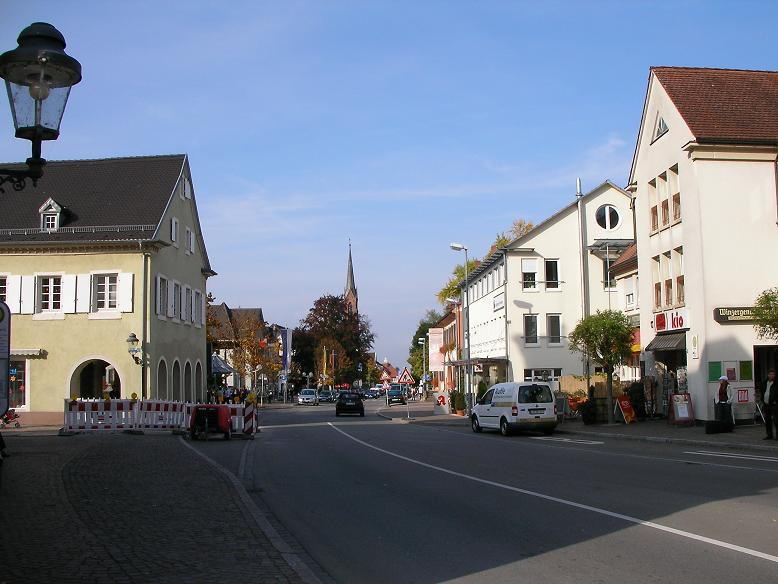

- Coat of arms

- Location of Müllheim im Markgräflerland within Breisgau-Hochschwarzwald district
- Interactive map of Müllheim im Markgräflerland
- Location within Germany Location within Baden-Württemberg
- Coordinates: 47°48′N 7°38′E
- Country: Germany
- State: Baden-Württemberg
- Admin. region: Freiburg
- District: Breisgau-Hochschwarzwald
- Subdivisions: 8

Government
  - Mayor (2019–27): Martin Löffler (SPD)

Area
  - Total: 57.91 km^{2} (22.36 sq mi)
- Elevation: 267 m (876 ft)

Population (2025-12-31)
  - Total: 20,241
  - Density: 349.5/km^{2} (905.3/sq mi)
- Time zone: UTC+01:00 (CET)
  - Summer (DST): UTC+02:00 (CEST)
- Postal codes: 79371–79379
- Dialling codes: 07631
- Vehicle registration: FR
- Website: www.muellheim.de

Müllheim im Markgräflerland (German pronunciation: [ˈmʏlhaɪm ʔɪm ˈmaʁkɡʁɛːflɐˌlant], lit. 'Müllheim in the Markgräflerland'; before May 2023: Müllheim; High Alemannic: Mille) is a town in Baden-Württemberg in southern Germany. It belongs to the district Breisgau-Hochschwarzwald. Müllheim is generally considered to be the center of the region known as Markgräflerland.

== History ==
On October 27, 758 Strachfried gave as a gift to the monastery of St. Gallen his properties in Müllheim, including the vineyards. This deed is in the archives of St. Gallen and it is where we today can find the first written reference to the "villa Mulinhaimo", which is the current city of Müllheim.

Archeology shows however that Müllheim was inhabited even earlier than this. During the renovation of the Martin's church in 1980 and 1981 the workers came upon a portion of a Roman villa. It is assumed that it is the center of large Roman possessions in the region.

== Population ==
Inhabitants: 17,630 (February 2002) as follows - 12,030 Central Müllheim 1351 Hügelheim; 1235 Niederweiler; 991 Britzingen; 812 Vögisheim; 636 Feldberg; 362 Dattingen; 215 Zunzingen.

== Geography ==
Müllheim is located in the center of Markgräflerland, in between the "Bath triangle" of Badenweiler, Bad Krozingen and Bad Bellingen. The city lies between the Rhine valley and the Black Forest with hills devoted largely to vineyards.

Müllheim is bordered by Auggen (to the south), Vögisheim to the southeast, and Hügelheim to the north. The main artery is the B3 which runs a north-south route along Müllheim's western side. It lies between Freiburg in the north and Basel, Switzerland to the south on this route.

== Economy ==
Local jobs roughly. 8,000 of which about 3,000 are industrial, mainly work with glass, and metal.

Commuting:

- Incoming: about 4,000
- Outgoing: about 3,000

== Education ==
=== General schools ===
- Michael-Friedrich-Wild-Grundschule
- Rosenburg Grundschule
- Grundschule Britzingen
- Adolf-Blankenhorn-Hauptschule
- Albert-Julius-Sievert-Förder- u. Sprachheilschule Heilpädagogisches Förderzentrum
- Alemannen-Realschule
- Markgräfler Gymnasium Müllheim
- Freie Waldorfschule

=== Professional schools ===
- Georg-Kerschensteiner-Schule Gewerbliche Schulen
- House (Home economics) and agricultural Schools
- Commercial Schools

=== Miscellaneous schools ===
- Forum Jugend-Beruf
- Grundschulförderklasse
- Sprachheilkindergarten

== Transport ==
Müllheim (Baden) station is on the Rhine Valley Railway, which is serviced by Deutsche Bahn.

- From Müllheim schedule
- To Müllheim schedule

== International relations ==
=== Twin towns and cities ===
Müllheim is twinned with:

- Gray, France
- Vevey, Switzerland

== People ==
- Ernst Krieck (1882–1947), teacher, writer and professor, influential on pedagogy in national socialism
- Joscha Kiefer (born 1982), actor
- Lada Pusch (born 2008), rhythmic gymnast
