= Raich =

- Ortsteil of Kleines Wiesental
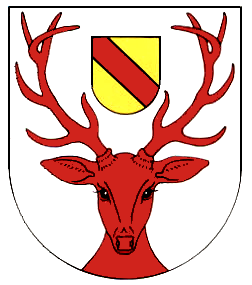
- Coat of arms
- Interactive map of Raich
- Location within Germany Location within Baden-Württemberg
- Coordinates: 47°45′04″N 07°48′01″E
- Country: Germany
- State: Baden-Württemberg
- Admin. region: Freiburg
- District: Lörrach
- Town: Kleines Wiesental

Area
  - Total: 9.36 km^{2} (3.61 sq mi)
- Elevation: 675 m (2,215 ft)

Population (2006-12-31)
  - Total: 297
  - Density: 31.7/km^{2} (82.2/sq mi)
- Time zone: UTC+01:00 (CET)
  - Summer (DST): UTC+02:00 (CEST)
- Postal codes: 79692
- Dialling codes: 07629
- Vehicle registration: LÖ
- Website: www.gemeinde-raich.de

Raich is a village and a former municipality in the district of Lörrach in Baden-Württemberg in Germany. Since 1 January 2009, it has been part of the municipality Kleines Wiesental.
