= Wies, Baden-Württemberg =

Wies
- Ortsteil of Kleines Wiesental
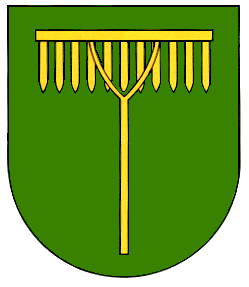
- Coat of arms
- Interactive map of Wies
- Location within Germany Location within Baden-Württemberg
- Coordinates: 47°45′00″N 07°46′11″E
- Country: Germany
- State: Baden-Württemberg
- Admin. region: Freiburg
- District: Lörrach
- Town: Kleines Wiesental

Area
  - Total: 21.80 km^{2} (8.42 sq mi)
- Elevation: 591 m (1,939 ft)

Population (2006-12-31)
  - Total: 658
  - Density: 30.2/km^{2} (78.2/sq mi)
- Time zone: UTC+01:00 (CET)
  - Summer (DST): UTC+02:00 (CEST)
- Postal codes: 79697
- Dialling codes: 07629
- Vehicle registration: LÖ
- Website: GVV kleines Wiesental

Wies is a village and a former municipality in the district of Lörrach in Baden-Württemberg in Germany. Since 1 January 2009, it is part of the municipality Kleines Wiesental.
