= Bürchau =

- Ortsteil of Kleines Wiesental
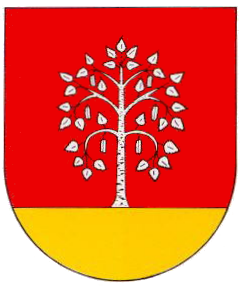
- Coat of arms
- Interactive map of Bürchau
- Location within Germany Location within Baden-Württemberg
- Coordinates: 47°46′30″N 07°49′37″E
- Country: Germany
- State: Baden-Württemberg
- Admin. region: Freiburg
- District: Lörrach
- Town: Kleines Wiesental

Area
  - Total: 6.12 km^{2} (2.36 sq mi)
- Elevation: 655 m (2,149 ft)

Population (2006-12-31)
  - Total: 190
  - Density: 31/km^{2} (80/sq mi)
- Time zone: UTC+01:00 (CET)
  - Summer (DST): UTC+02:00 (CEST)
- Postal codes: 79683
- Dialling codes: 07629
- Vehicle registration: LÖ
- Website: www.buerchau.de

Bürchau is a village and a former municipality in the district of Lörrach in Baden-Württemberg in Germany. Since 1 January 2009, it is part of the municipality Kleines Wiesental.
