= Wieslet =

- Ortsteil of Kleines Wiesental
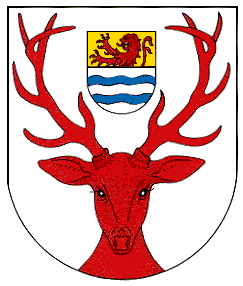
- Coat of arms
- Interactive map of Wieslet
- Location within Germany Location within Baden-Württemberg
- Coordinates: 47°41′21″N 07°47′50″E
- Country: Germany
- State: Baden-Württemberg
- Admin. region: Freiburg
- District: Lörrach
- Town: Kleines Wiesental

Area
  - Total: 6.40 km^{2} (2.47 sq mi)
- Elevation: 387 m (1,270 ft)

Population (2006-12-31)
  - Total: 589
  - Density: 92.0/km^{2} (238/sq mi)
- Time zone: UTC+01:00 (CET)
  - Summer (DST): UTC+02:00 (CEST)
- Postal codes: 79699
- Dialling codes: 07622
- Vehicle registration: LÖ
- Website: www.wieslet.de

Wieslet is a village and a former municipality in the district of Lörrach in Baden-Württemberg in Germany. Since 1 January 2009, it is part of the municipality Kleines Wiesental.
