= Neuenweg =

- Ortsteil of Kleines Wiesental
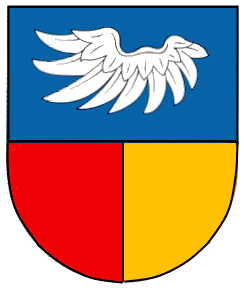
- Coat of arms
- Interactive map of Neuenweg
- Location within Germany Location within Baden-Württemberg
- Coordinates: 47°47′43″N 07°49′39″E
- Country: Germany
- State: Baden-Württemberg
- Admin. region: Freiburg
- District: Lörrach
- Town: Kleines Wiesental

Area
  - Total: 12.65 km^{2} (4.88 sq mi)
- Elevation: 722 m (2,369 ft)

Population (2006-12-31)
  - Total: 340
  - Density: 27/km^{2} (70/sq mi)
- Time zone: UTC+01:00 (CET)
  - Summer (DST): UTC+02:00 (CEST)
- Postal codes: 79691
- Dialling codes: 07673
- Vehicle registration: LÖ
- Website: www.neuenweg.de

Neuenweg is a village and a former municipality in the district of Lörrach in Baden-Württemberg in Germany. Since 1 January 2009, it is part of the municipality Kleines Wiesental.
