= Auggen =

- Municipality
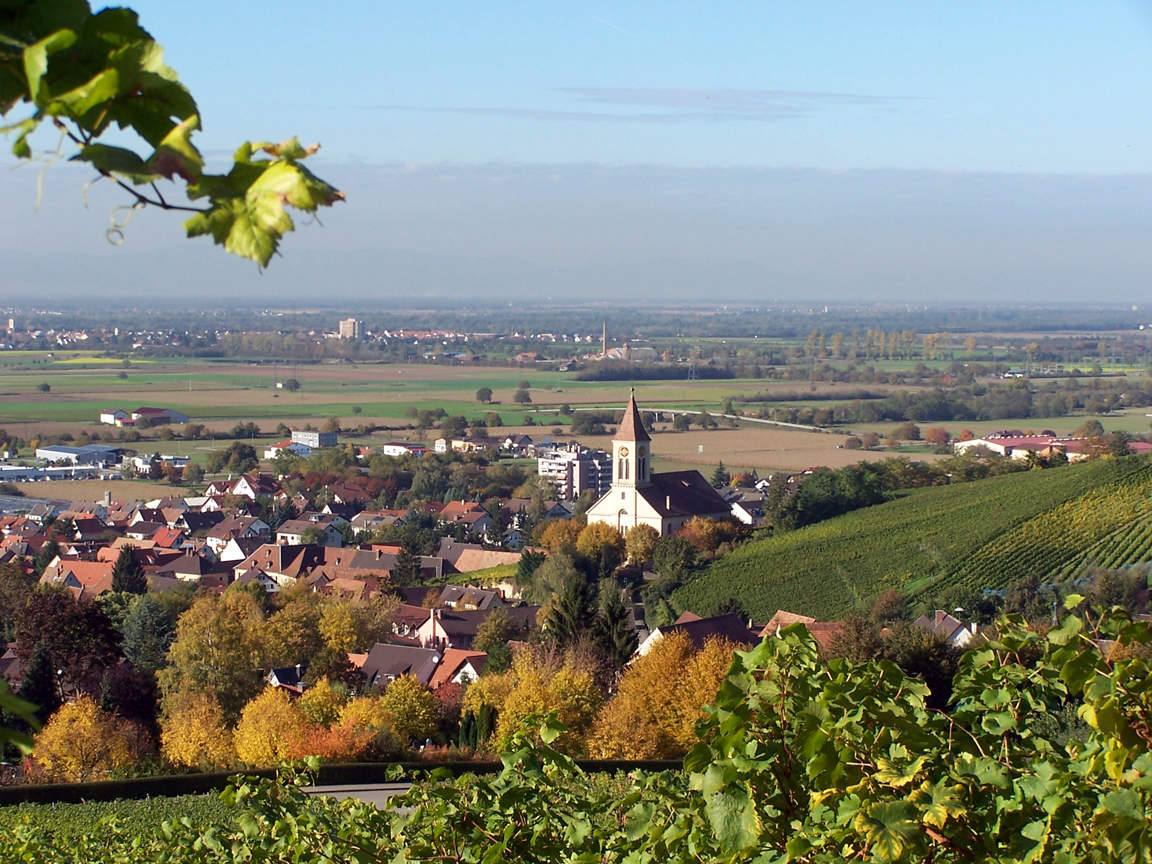
- General view of the town

- Coat of arms

- Location of Auggen within Breisgau-Hochschwarzwald district
- Interactive map of Auggen
- Location within Germany Location within Baden-Württemberg
- Coordinates: 47°47′13″N 7°35′46″E
- Country: Germany
- State: Baden-Württemberg
- Admin. region: Freiburg
- District: Breisgau-Hochschwarzwald

Government
  - Mayor (2021–29): Ulli Waldkirch

Area
  - Total: 14.15 km^{2} (5.46 sq mi)
- Elevation: 264 m (866 ft)

Population (2025-12-31)
  - Total: 2,794
  - Density: 197.5/km^{2} (511.4/sq mi)
- Time zone: UTC+01:00 (CET)
  - Summer (DST): UTC+02:00 (CEST)
- Postal codes: 79424
- Dialling codes: 07631
- Vehicle registration: FR
- Website: www.auggen.de

Auggen is a municipality in the district of Breisgau-Hochschwarzwald in Baden-Württemberg in southern Germany. It also belongs to a region called Markgräflerland that has both cultural and historical importance.

Auggen has attached to it, a smaller administrative part called Hach. Hach lies to the northeast of Auggen. Auggen lies at the southern end of Breisgau. The area is known, amongst other things, for its biodynamic wine.

== Economy ==
Auggen has a discount Grocery store called "Netto", a free-standing bakery on the hauptstrasse, some restaurants, a small drugstore, and a petrol (gas) station which has a convenience store attached to it. It has 2 car dealers. It is also home to one of Europe's largest computer catalogue stores.

Some forms of employment include the Winzergenossenschaft Auggen (a wine growers coop - and a fruit juice producer - .

International work also takes place from Auggen. It is the home to New Life Network, (NLN, Inc.) , which is an international distributor of television programs, and Genesis Distributions which works with duty-free shops internationally

== Education ==
Auggen has an elementary school (in German called Grundschule; see Education in Germany): Brunwart-von-Augheim-Schule. Further education takes place in nearby cities such as Müllheim and Neuenburg.

== Transport ==
Auggen has its own train stop on the Freiburg/Basel line, serviced by the Deutsche Bahn.

== Recreation and Entertainment ==
Selected list of clubs:

- Volunteer Fire
- Football Club
- Turnverein
- Musikverein

== History ==
Auggen was first mentioned in 752 as 'Anghom'. It is nonetheless believed that the first settlers were already there in the 1st century.

=== Mayors of Auggen ===
(2005–present) Fritz Deutschmann

(1629–1662) Dietrich Koger
