= Loerrach International =

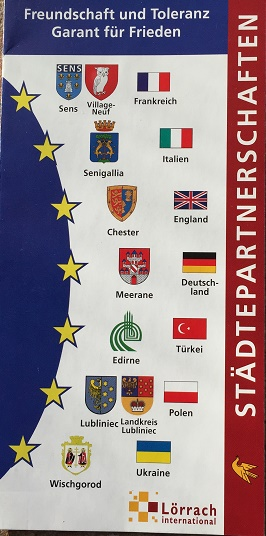
Lörrach International Flyer

Loerrach International e.V. (registered association) is an association of citizens, educational, sport and cultural institutions, service clubs, municipal administration and local council in Lörrach in southwestern Germany. It has the goal of fostering relations with the town's partner towns. Its structure has long been a model for similar town partnership organisations in other European cities.

== Foundation and function ==
At the suggestion of Charles de Gaulle and Konrad Adenauer, the then mayor of Loerrach Egon Hugenschmidt founded the first partnership with Sens in France in 1966. Under mayor Rainer Offergeld the partnership with Senigallia in Italy followed and in 1986 and under mayor Gudrun Heute-Bluhm in 2003 with Chester in England. Further partnerships have been established with Meerane in Saxony, Vyshhorod in the Ukraine und Lubliniec in Silesia. A special feature is the friendship with Edirne in Turkey, which arose from a citizens‘ initiative.

Loerrach International was founded by Gudrun Heute-Bluhm as president and Manfred G. Raupp as chairman on 22 September 2004. The various fractions in the city council were each asked to nominate a representative and a deputy to the extended board of the society.

== Working groups ==
France Sens, AG Sens
Italy Senigallia, AG Senigallia
Germany Meerane, AG Meerane
United Kingdom Chester AG Chester
Turkey Edirne, AG Türkei
France Village-Neuf, AG Village-Neuf – Lörrach-Haagen
Ukraine Vyshhorod, AG Osteuropa together with Lubliniec
Poland Landkreis Lubliniec, AG Osteuropa together with Vyshhorod

Working groups were set up for Sens, Senigallia, Chester, Meerane, and Eastern Europe, and the youth organisation SAK Lörrach, the town band, its schools (Hans-Thoma-Gymnasium Lörrach, Phaenovum Schülerforschungszentrum Lörrach-Dreiländereck) and DHBW-Loerrach, sport and culture organisations and service clubs were invited to collaborate. On his election to mayor in 2014 Jörg Lutz became ex officio president of the society.

Since the society's foundation around 50 events involving the partner towns have taken place every year, the majority involving schools and youth groups from the partner towns.

== Structure ==
The structure of the society brings together interested citizens, educational institutions, the local council and city administration. The president is ex officio the current mayor and the secretarial duties of the management committee is the responsibility of the representatives of the various town partnerships. However, all other activities are conducted by about 140 members on a voluntary basis.

Since November 2022 Prof. Dr. Sebastian Feichtmair, Head of International Business at Baden-Wuerttemberg Cooperative State University Loerrach, has been the chairperson. He took over from Susanne Daniel who became the 2nd chairperson.

== Honorary members ==
- Derek Jackson, KBE Chester, Chester International Link Assoziation
- Gudrun Heute-Bluhm, Loerrach, former president of Loerrach International
- Manfred G. Raupp, Stutensee, former chairman of Loerrach International

== Literature ==
- Manfred G. Raupp & Baerbel Bouziane: Loerrach und die Elysee Freundschaft, Loerrach 2013 ISBN 978-3-9815406-3-5
- Manfred G. Raupp & Peter Lepkojis: Das deutsch-türkische Pflegeprojekt Lörrach-Edirne; Eine Information für den deutsch-türkischen Pflegekräfteaustausch, Lörrach 2013 ISBN 978-3-9815406-4-2
- Manfred G. Raupp: DHBW Cooperative State University; an innovative system of higher education; Balkan Conference Edirne 2010
- Manfred G. Raupp: Lörrach Symposium; 5 Jahre Hochschul- und Kulturpartnerschaft Lörrach-Edirne, Lörrach 2011 ISBN 978-3-942298-02-5
- Manfred G. Raupp: Enver Duran; Medizinprofessor und Rektor der Trakya Universität 2004–2012, Lörrach 2012 ISBN 978-3-9815406-0-4
- Manfred G. Raupp (Hrsg.): Vademecum a Handbook for Sustainable Tourism in the twin towns Sens (France), Senigallia (Italy), Chester (England) and Loerrach (Germany), EU Project Net4ps; Lörrach International e.V. 2013, ISBN 978-3-9815406-6-6

== Presentations ==
- Manfred G. Raupp: Die DHBW-Lörrach bietet ein innovatives Studiensystem; Balkankonferenz Edirne Mai 2010
- Bernd Martin: Lörrach-Tag Trakaya-Universität Edirne DHBW Lörrach und ihre Bedeutung für die Region
- Enver Duran: Die Entwicklung der Universitäten in der Türkei und Deutschland und deren aktuelle Chancen und Probleme; Lörrach Symposium Edirne Mai 2011
- Mukadder Seyhan Yücel: Der Stellenwert der Fremdsprachen an der Trakya Universität; Lörrach Symposium Edirne Mai 2011
- Hilmi Ibar: Die Trakya Universität und deren Engagement im Netzwerk der Balkanuniversitäten
- Manfred G. Raupp: Würdigung anlässlich der Verabschiedung von Enver Duran, Medizinprofessor und Rektor der Trakya Universität Edirne 2004–2012, Brückenbauer und Friedensstifter.
