= Lörrach =

- Town
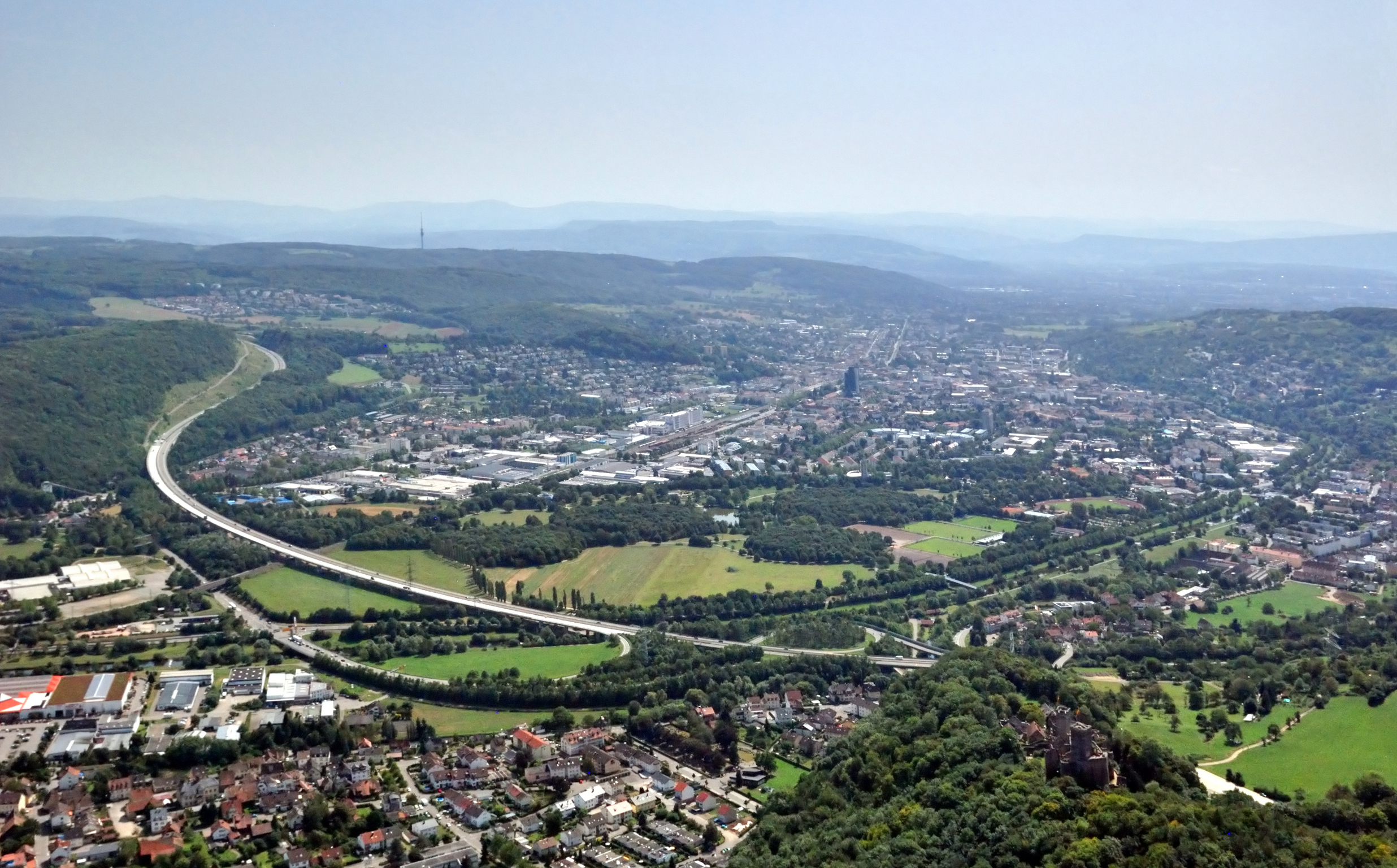
- Aerial view at Lörrach from the north

- Coat of arms

- Location of Lörrach within Lörrach district
- Interactive map of Lörrach
- Location within Germany Location within Baden-Württemberg
- Coordinates: 47°37′N 7°40′E
- Country: Germany
- State: Baden-Württemberg
- Admin. region: Freiburg
- District: Lörrach

Government
  - Mayor (2022–30): Jörg Lutz (Ind.)

Area
  - Total: 39.37 km^{2} (15.20 sq mi)
- Elevation: 294 m (965 ft)

Population (2025-12-31)
  - Total: 51,274
  - Density: 1,302/km^{2} (3,373/sq mi)
- Time zone: UTC+01:00 (CET)
  - Summer (DST): UTC+02:00 (CEST)
- Postal codes: 79501-79541
- Dialling codes: (+49) 07621
- Vehicle registration: LÖ
- Website: loerrach.de

Lörrach (German pronunciation: [ˈlœʁax]) is a city in southwest Germany, in the valley of the Wiese, close to the French and the Swiss borders. It is the district seat of the district of Lörrach in Baden-Württemberg. It is the home of a number of large employers, including the Milka chocolate factory owned by Mondelez International. The city population has grown over the last century; with only 10,794 in 1905, it has now increased its population to over 50,000.

Nearby is the castle of Rötteln on the Wiesental, whose lords became the counts of Hachberg and a residence of the Margraves of Baden; this was destroyed by the troops of Louis XIV in 1678, but was rebuilt in 1867. Lörrach received market rights in 1403, but it did not obtain the privileges of a city until 1682.

After the Napoleonic epoch, the town was included in the Grand Duchy of Baden. On 21 September 1848, Gustav Struve attempted to start a revolutionary uprising in Lörrach as part of the Revolutions of 1848–49. It failed, and Struve was caught and imprisoned. Still, Lörrach was officially the capital of Germany for a day.

== Geography ==
Lörrach is located in the southernmost part of the Rhine Rift valley. The depression is created by tectonic movements, and the area has a high earthquake risk. Several times a year, Lörrach is afflicted by slight and medial earthquakes.

The city is located in a valley of the Quaternary period. Lörrach is surrounded by slopes on two sides. The slopes create the southern part of the Wiesental, that is the valley where the Wiese river flows.

Geographical locations of the subdistrict Lörrach:

- Elevation of the lowest place: 272 m (in the valley Wiesental at the border with Switzerland)
- Elevation of the highest place: 570 m (in the forest of Rötteln)

The extent of the urban area from south to north is 6.0 km and from east to west 4.6 km. Lörrach is also the capital city of Markgräflerland and a part of the tri-national agglomeration area of Basel (Switzerland). Stuttgart is 220 km away from Lörrach, and it takes one hour to drive to Bern or Zürich. The city has several forested hills along the valley Wiesental: Schädelberg, Homburg, Röttler Wald, and Tüllinger Berg.

Lörrach is bounded by many municipalities and the city of Riehen (Switzerland). In addition, it is located in the foothills of the Black Forest and on the border of Switzerland.

Binzen	Rümmingen	Steinen
Weil am Rhein		Rheinfelden
Riehen (CH)	Inzlingen; Grenzach-Wyhlen

=== Climate ===
Lörrach's climate is mild, and in the summer, it is often hot. The region of Markgräflerland is the warmest in Germany because of the Mediterranean air current from the valley of the Rhône. Because of its numerous sunny days, the region is dubbed the German Tuscany (German: Die Toskana Deutschlands).

=== Boroughs and districts ===
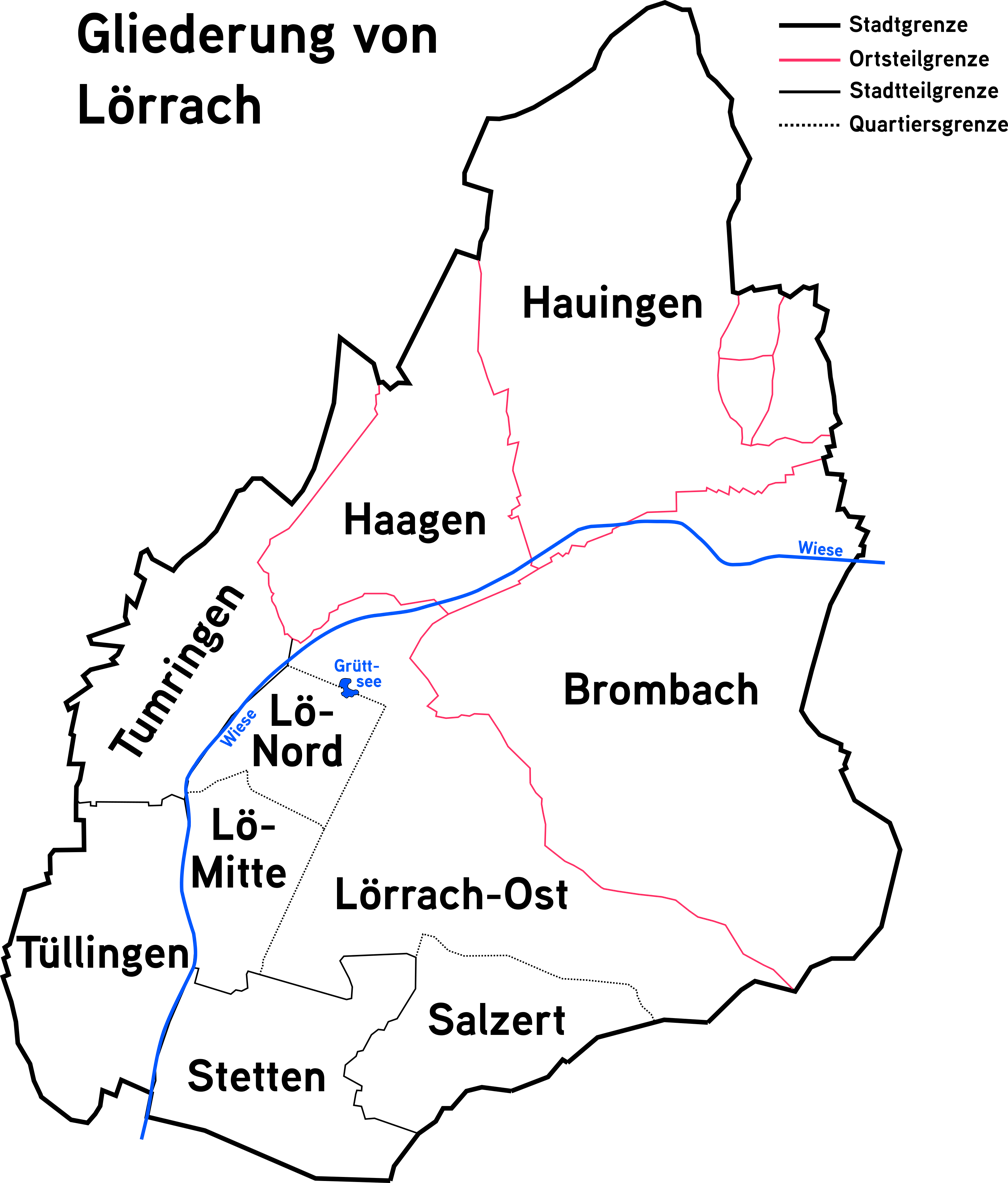
Lörrach with its boroughs and districts

Lörrach is subdivided into three boroughs and three districts. In sum, the three boroughs have an area of 18.6 km^{2}.

Year of incorporation	Boroughs and districts	Area (km^{2})
1935	Borough Tumringen	4.4
1935	Borough Tüllingen	2.1
1908	Borough Stetten	4.6
1974	District Haagen	3.6
1975	District Brombach	9.8
1975	District Hauingen	7.4

The three districts have their own administrations with a chief magistrate (Ortsvorsteher). Every five years, the citizens of Lörrach elect the council of the districts. The satellite city Salzert was developed in 1963. Inzlingen, close to Lörrach, is an independent municipality, but Lörrach oversees its administration.

== History ==
Year	Event
1102	Lörrach was first mentioned as the settlement Lorracho.
1403	Rupert of Germany declared Lörrach a market town.
1678	The castle of Rötteln was destroyed by the French.
1682	Lörrach was granted town privileges by Frederick VII, Margrave of Baden-Durlach.
1702	Battle of Käferholz against the French.
1756	The town received a new civic law and its first town hall.
1783	Johann Peter Hebel became a teacher at the boarding school.
1803	Stetten became a part of Baden, having previously belonged to Austria.
1808	In Lörrach, numerous buildings in the classical style were built (synagogue, Stadtkirche, and Fridolinskirche).
1835	The state Baden joins the Zollverein.
1848	In September, Gustav Struve declared the new 'German Republic' from the town hall of Lörrach after the failed revolution. Some days later, he was arrested.
1862	The Wiesentalbahn between Basel, Lörrach, and Schopfheim was opened. A railway connection to Weil and Säckingen was extended to Lörrach in 1890. Also, Carl Christian Renaux was born on 11 March.
1863	Lörrach became a district seat.
1871	The first elementary school was opened.
1880	Philippe Suchard created a chocolate factory in Lörrach.
1908	Incorporation of Stetten; later, Tüllingen und Tumringen (1935), Haagen (voluntary 1974), Brombach und Hauingen (1975), were incorporated.
1945	Air raid on Brombach and Lörrach: On 24 April, French troops occupied the city.
1963	Start of construction of the district of Salzert.
1983	The fourth Landesgartenschau of Baden-Württemberg (a national horticultural show) was held in the new park area in the Grütt.
1984	The finished motorway section between High Rhine and Upper Rhine relieved the heavy traffic of the city.
1991	Inauguration of the new pedestrian precinct and the transformation of the city centre.
2010	Two were killed and one injured in a shooting incident at the Saint Elizabeth Hospital.

=== Population development ===
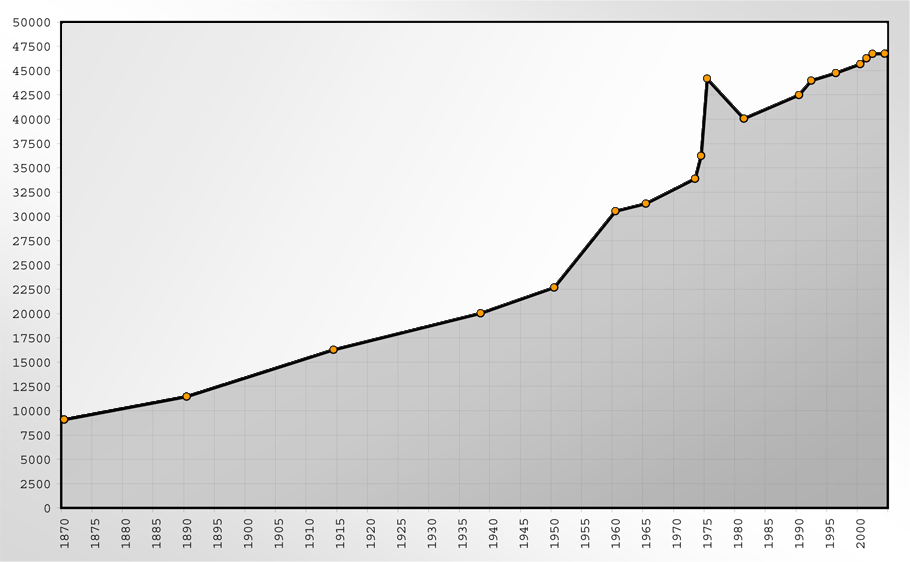
Population development

Year	Population	Year	Population
1870	9,103	1975	44,179
1890	11,475	1981	40,064
1914	16,293	1990	42,500
1938	20,041	1992	43,976
1950	22,698	1996	44,756
1960	30,546	2000	45,679
1965	31,324	2001	46,272
1973	33,885	2002	46,741
1974	36,231	2004	46,754

source: Statistisches Landesamt Stuttgart, Statistischer Jahresbericht der Stadt Lörrach.

=== Coat of arms ===
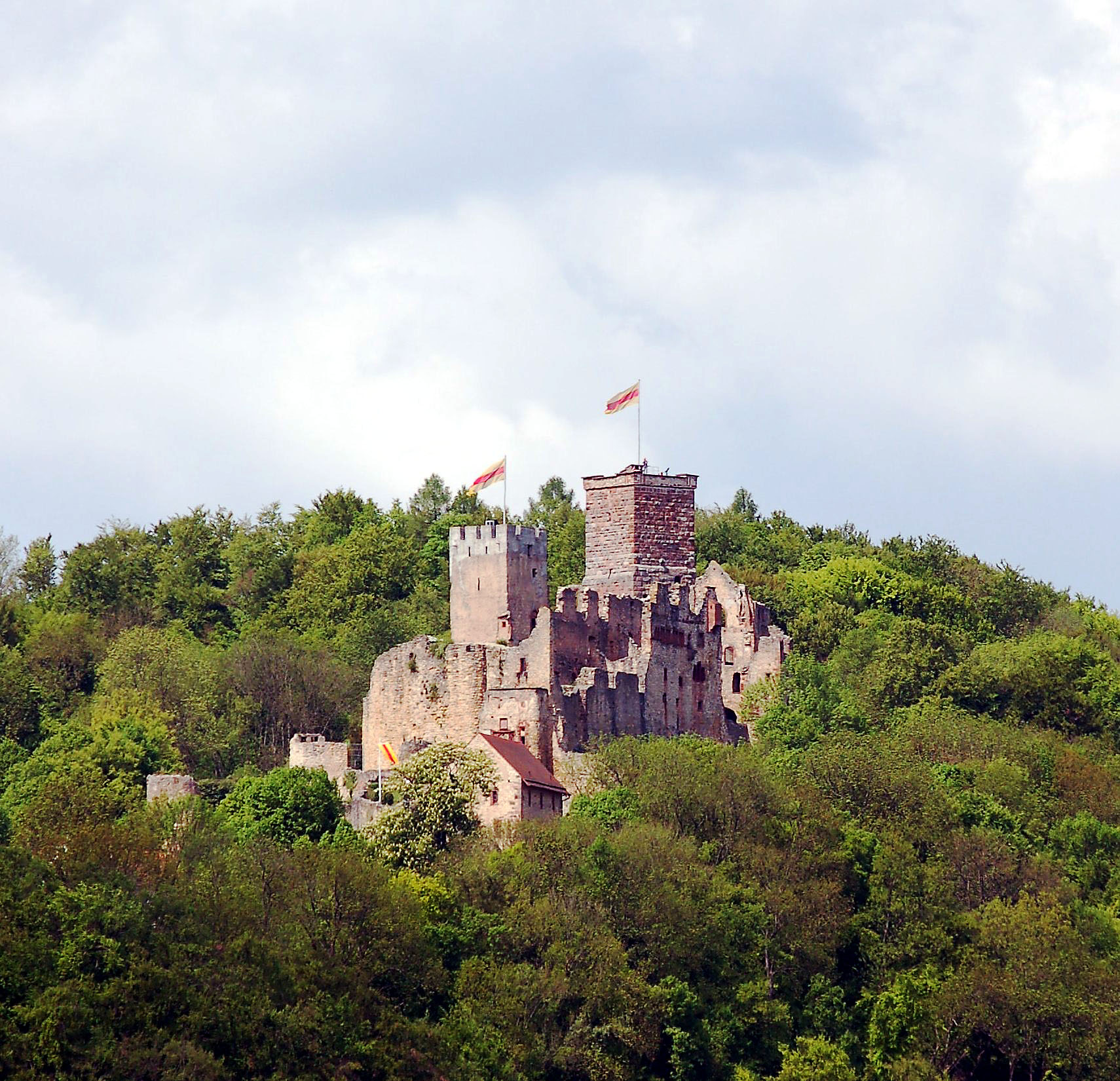
Ruins of Rötteln Castle in Lörrach

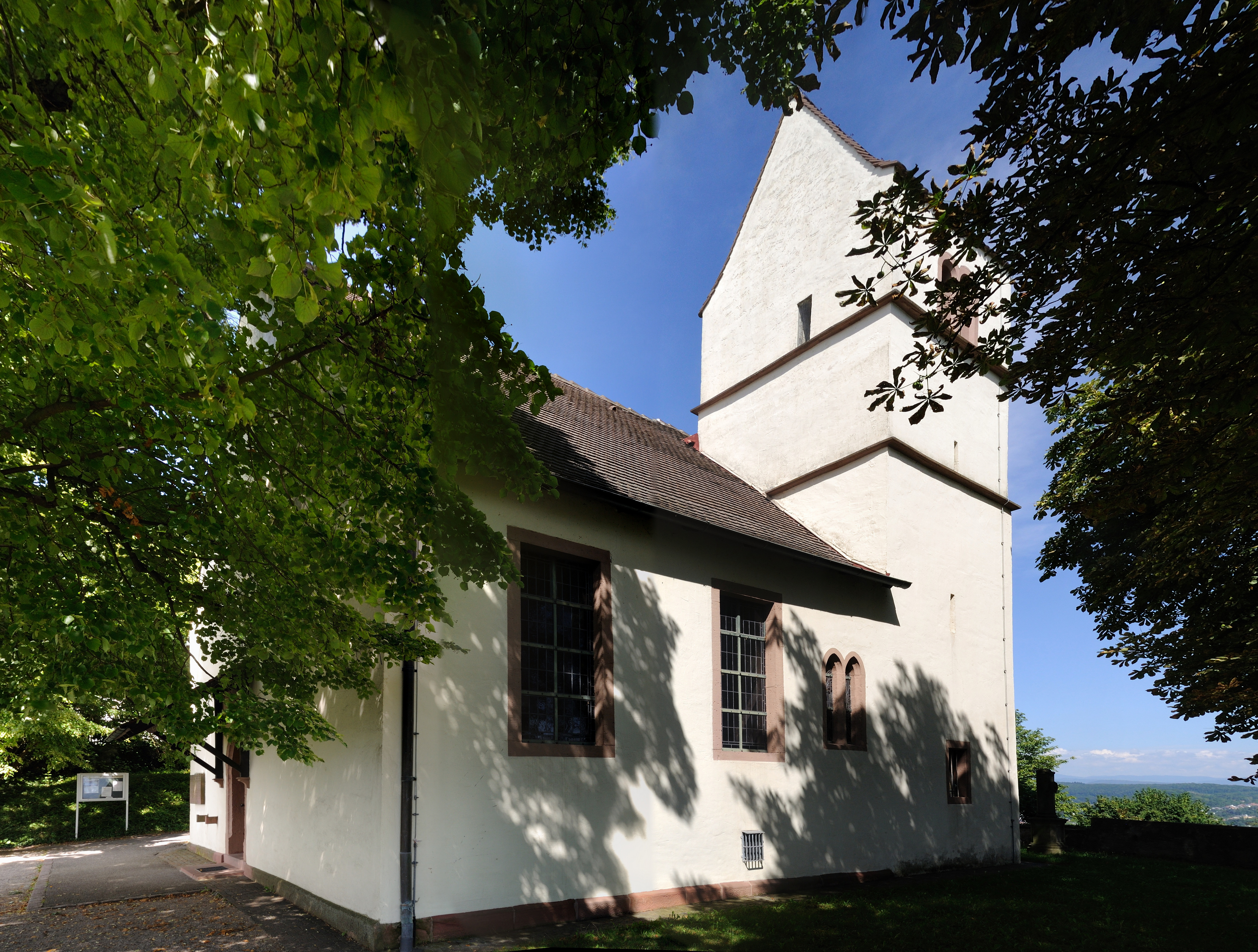
St. Ottilien church in Tüllingen

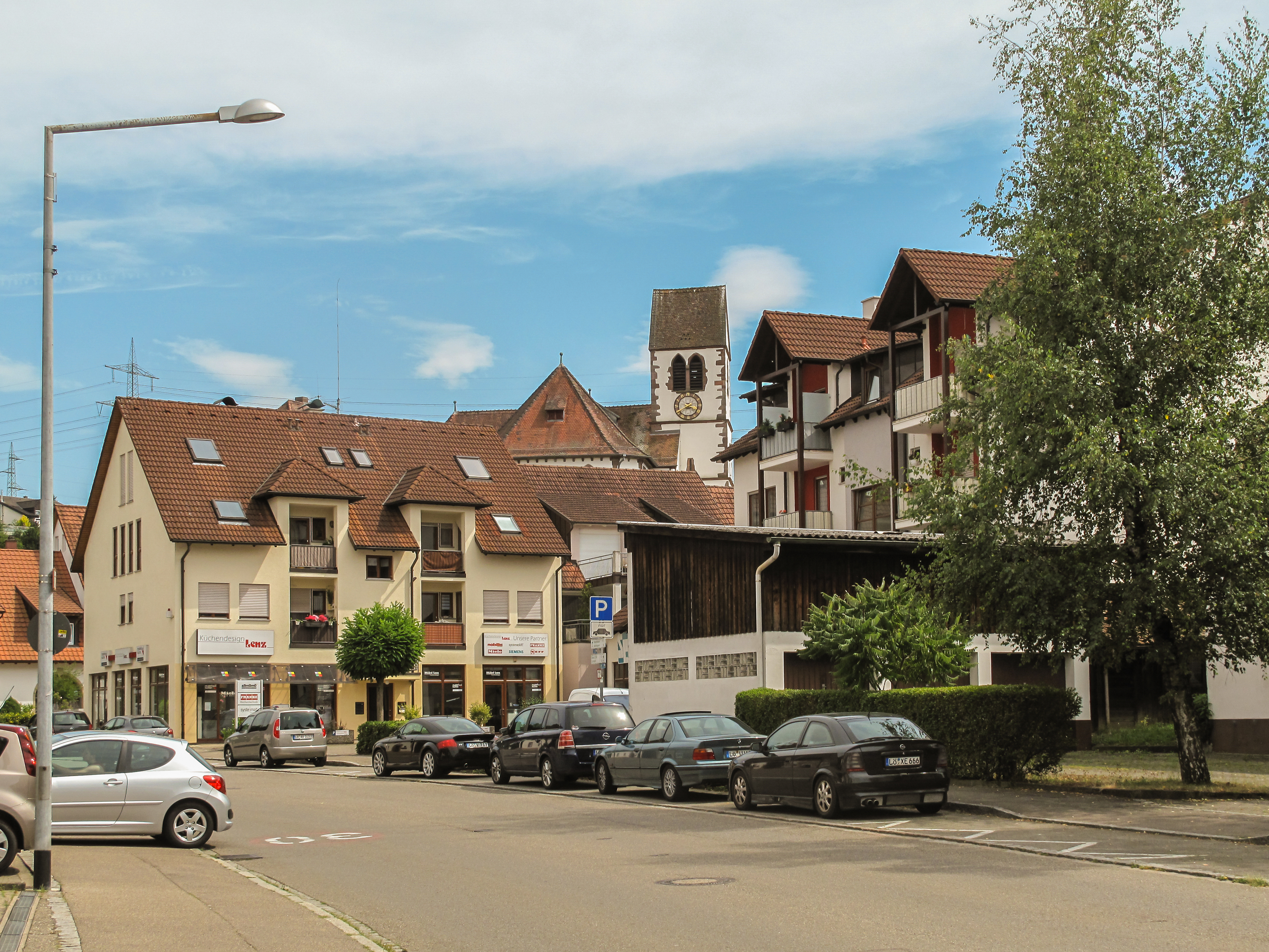
View to a street with church (die Germanuskirche) in Brombach

Lörrach received its city rights in 1682 when it became the capital of the Oberamt Rötteln-Sausenberg. At the same time, its arms were granted. The arms show a canting lark (Lerche). In 1756, both the city rights and the arms were regranted by Margrave Charles Frederick of Baden. The colours are also the colours of Baden. Even though the arms have not changed since, the shape and size of the lark have changed considerably. The present arms have been used since the early 1960s and show a very modern variation of the lark. After municipal reforms, the coat of arms was reconfirmed on 11 November 1975.

=== Religion ===
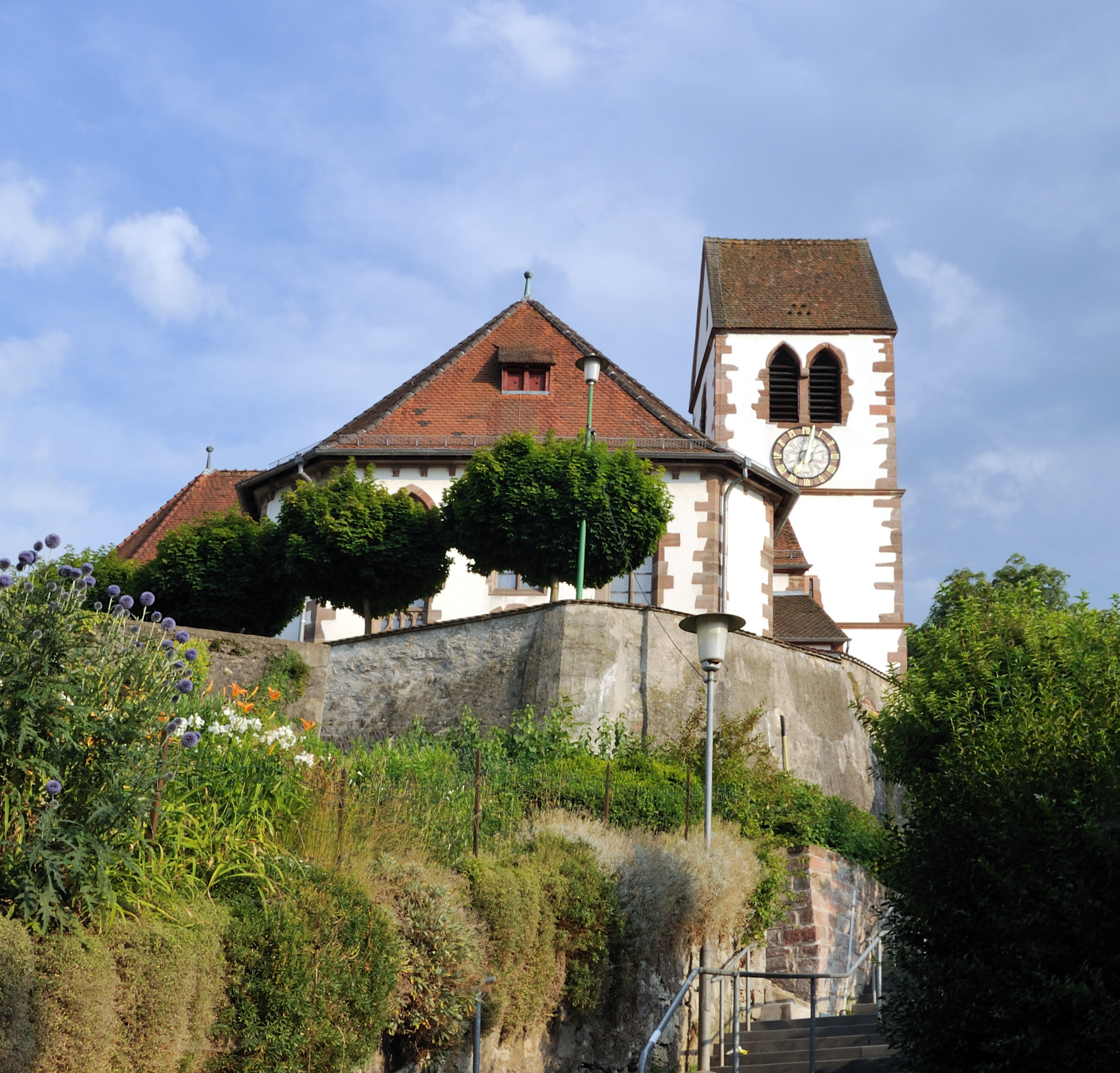
Church in Brombach

Christianity

Lörrach initially belonged to the diocese of Konstanz and was under the archdiocese of Breisgau. In 1529, after the Reformation had been introduced there, the parsonage of Lörrach was occupied from Basel. The reformation in the city was introduced in 1556. After that, Lörrach was for many centuries a predominantly Protestant city. In Rötteln, an archdiocese had existed since the beginning of the 15th century, which at the end of the 17th century, shifted to Lörrach. The Protestant pastor of Lörrach was from 1682 an intendant, too. The Stadtkirche is the main church of Lörrach (first mentioned in the 12th century). In addition, Lörrach has a few parishes: Johannespfarrei (founded in the 20th century), Pauluspfarrei for the northern city (founded in 1906), Matthäuspfarrei for the eastern city, Inzlingen (founded in 1949), Markuspfarrei (founded in 1956), Salzertgemeinde (founded in 1969), and Friedensgemeinde for the district of Homburg (founded in 1974).

The borough of Stetten was controlled by Austria until 1803. Therefore, Stetten has a Catholic tradition, although the Reformation had been introduced years before. Because of a contract with Austria, Stetten again became Catholic. At first, the parish of Stetten also served the resident Catholics of Lörrach. They held their church services in the new church, the Fridolinskirche (1822). The original church of Stettens was founded in the 13th century. Between 1864 and 1867 in Lörrach, its own parish church (St. Bonifatius) was built, at which a curacy was created that was raised to the status of a parsonage in 1882. A second Catholic church (St. Peter) was built in 1964. In Brombach, they had already built in 1900 a church (St. Josephskirche), which has been a parsonage since 1911. All Catholic parishes of Lörrach today form together with the neighbouring parishes of St. Peter and Paul in Inzlingen a group pastoral ministry within the deanery of Wiesental belonging to the archbishopric Freiburg.

Today, the Lutheran denomination has a slight predominance in the city. In the borough of Stetten exists a relative Catholic majority.

Beside the two large churches, some parishes belong to free churches; for example, the Freie evangelische Gemeinde or FeG Lörrach (English: Free Evangelical community).

== Politics ==
=== Political proportion ===
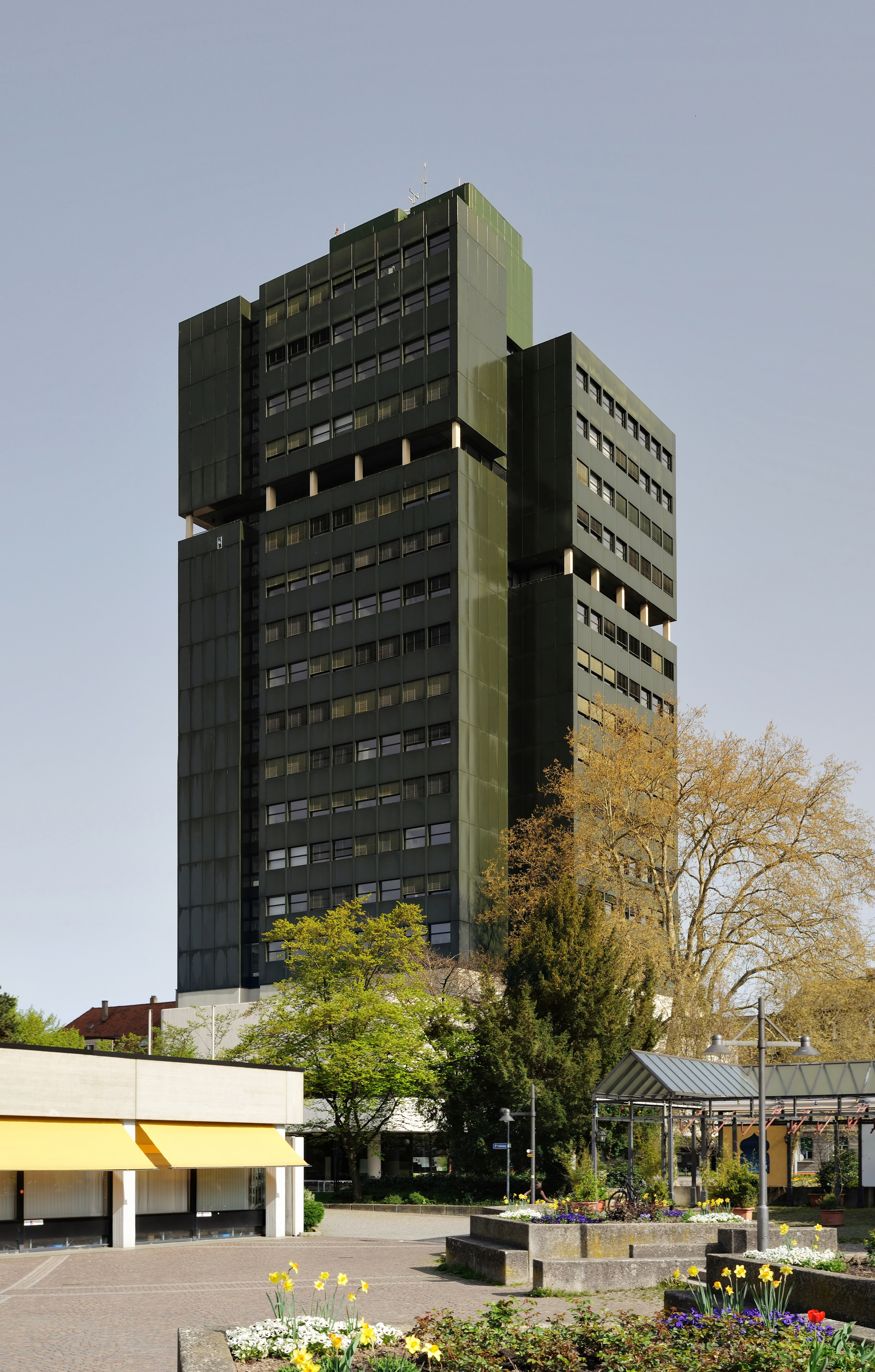
Town Hall of Lörrach (cognomen: Langer Egon)

The municipal council of Lörrach consists of 32 volunteer aldermen and alderwomen, whose chairman is the Oberbürgermeisterin (mayor). The municipal council is elected for a period of five years by the citizenry.

The last election from 13 June 2004 had a percentage of voting of 41.2% and resulted in the following allocation of seats in the city hall of Lörrach:

Party	Proportion	*	Seats	*
CDU	33.3%	-5.0%	11	-7
SPD	21.0%	-2.5%	7	-4
Freie Wähler	15.8%	+1.7%	5	-3
GRÜNE	15.7%	+4.0%	5	±0
FDP	8.0%	+5.1%	2	+1
KUL (1)	6.1%	-0.5%	2	-1
total	100%		32	-14

(1) Kommunale Unabhängige Liste (English: Municipal autonomous list)
* variance to the municipal council elections of 1999.

=== Heads of city ===
The chronicle of Lörrach reports of a Johann von Schallbach in the year 1366 as the first Vogt. The office designation of mayor was reserved for the local chiefs of the cities. The first mayor of Lörrach was Marx Christoph Leibfried, who took office in 1882, the year the municipality was first awarded town privileges. He was employed by the Markgraf. Since 1956, the city head is the Oberbürgermeister, who is selected directly by the citizens.

=== Mayors since 1804 ===
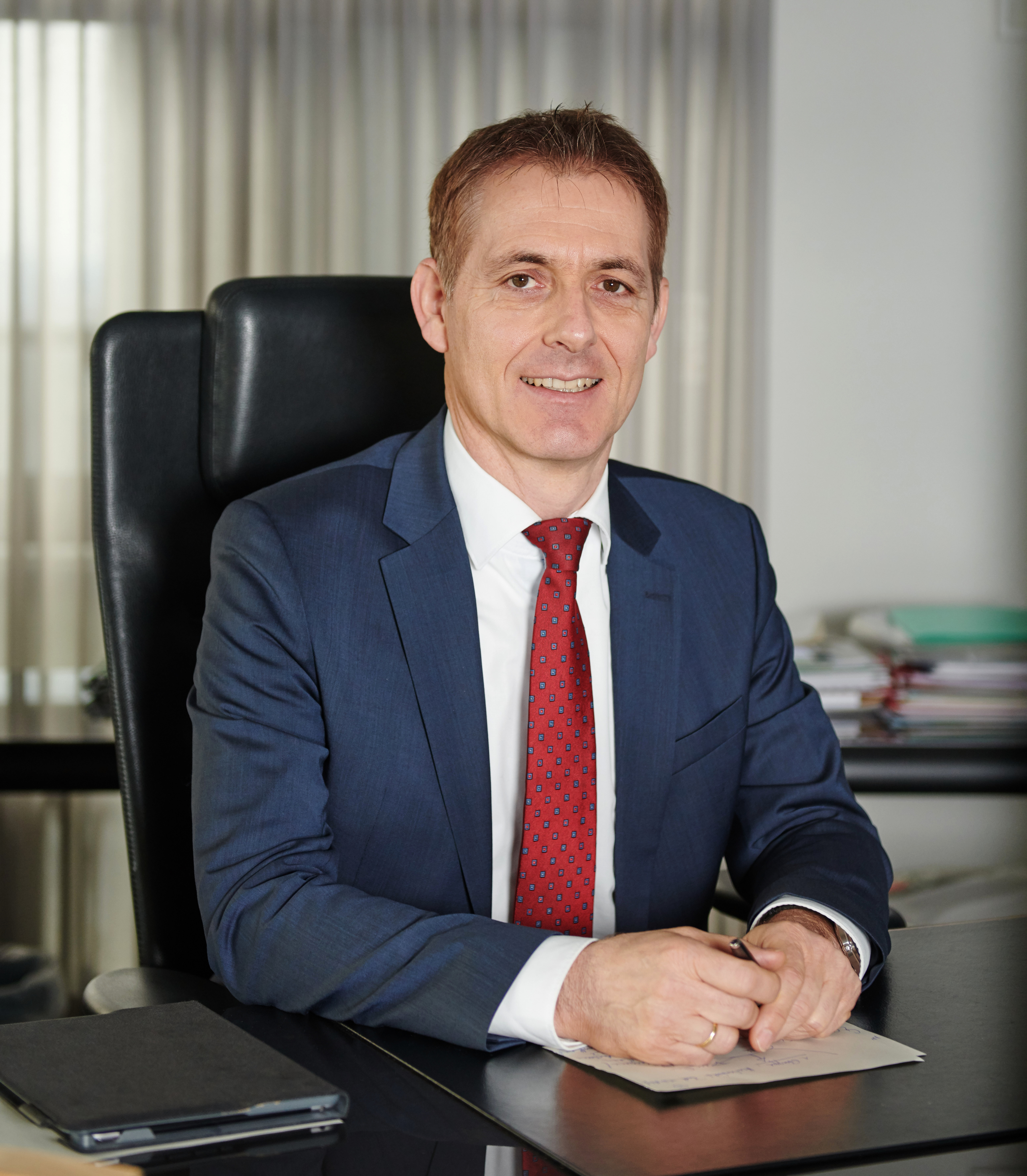
Jörg Lutz is mayor of Lörrach since 2014.

Curatorship	Name	Curatorship	Name
1804–1807	Johann Martin Strohmeier	1861–1863	Karl Wenner
1807–1810	Johann Jakob Grether	1863–1869	Paul Feldkirchner
1810–1814	Johann Kaspar Schöffel	1869–1871	Karl Robert Gebhardt
1814–1820	Johann Georg Grether	1872–1906	Johann Josef Grether
1820–1826	Jakob Rupp	1906–1927	Erwin Gugelmeier*
1826–1831	Friedrich Hüglin	1927–1933	Heinrich Graser
1831–1832	Ernst Schultz	1933–1945	Reinhard Boos
1832–1835	Johann Georg Grether	1945–1948	Joseph Pfeffer
1835–1841	Ernst Schultz	1948–1960	Arend Braye*
1841–1844	Friedrich Hüglin	1960–1984	Egon Hugenschmidt*
1844–1849	Karl Wenner	1984–1995	Rainer Offergeld*
1849–1861	Johann Ludwig Calame	1995–2014	Gudrun Heute-Bluhm*
1861–1863	Karl Wenner	2014–2026	Joerg Lutz*

* Oberbürgermeister

== Economics and infrastructure ==
The town supports approximately 18,300 jobs. Retailers gained a business volume of 342.7 million euros in the year 2004. Approximately a fifth of this business volume was generated by customers from Switzerland.

=== Transport ===
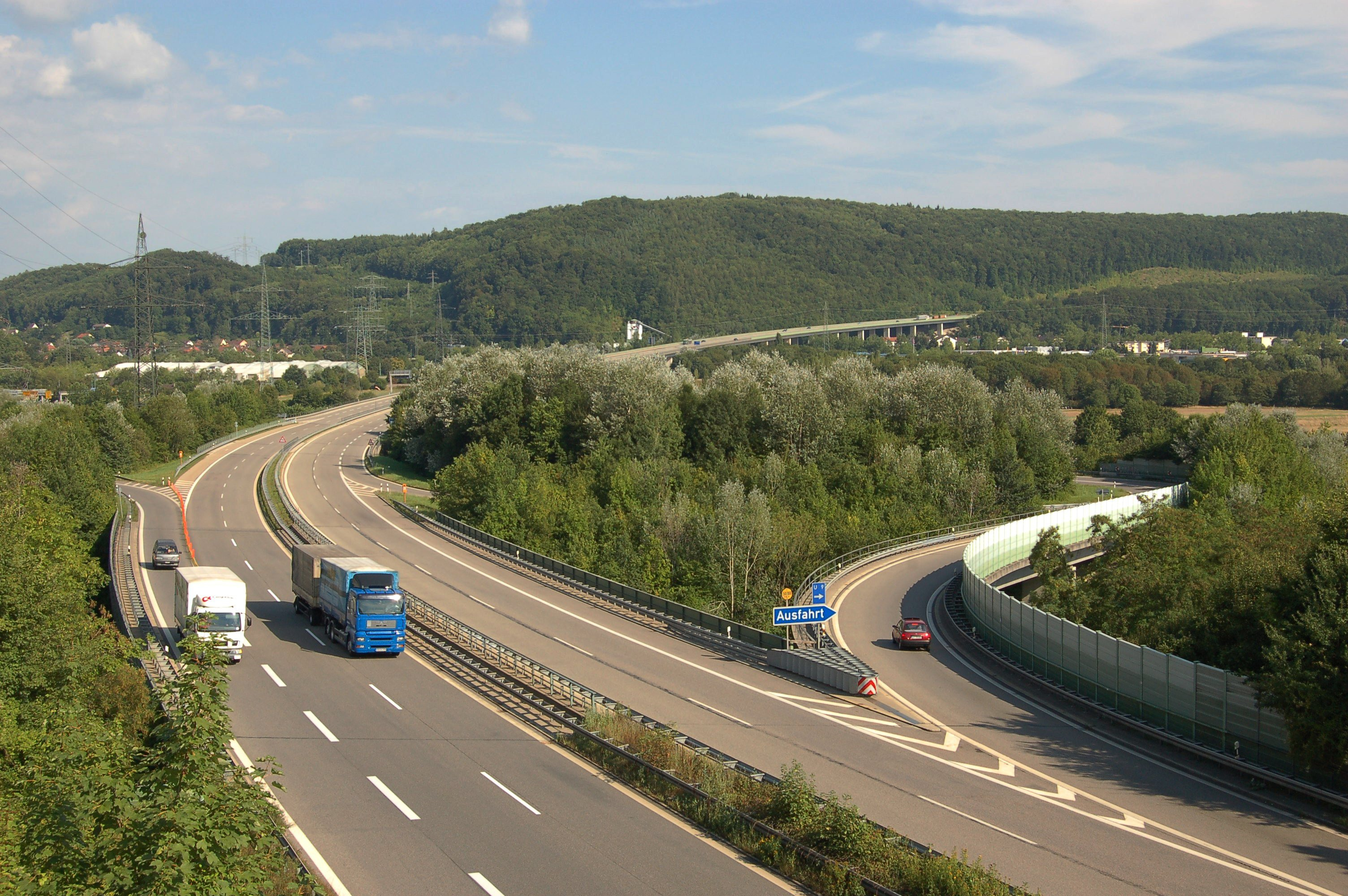
Bundesautobahn 98

Bundesautobahn 98 passes Lörrach. Thereby it has a direct connection to the Bundesautobahn 5 and to the A35 autoroute in France. The A2 motorway and the A3 motorway of Switzerland are also near Lörrach. The Bundesstraße B 317, from Titisee-Neustadt across the pass of the Feldberg, is the most important arterial road of the city. The Bundesstraße 317 is interrupted by Switzerland. At present the B 317 is built through the Swiss territory as duty-free road.

The principal railway station in Lörrach is Lörrach Hauptbahnhof, with frequent service provided by the Basel S-Bahn. There are a half-dozen other stations within the municipality. The terminal connects Lörrach with Hildesheim, Bremen, Hamburg and Berlin. From 1919 to 1939 as well as from 1947 to 1967 Line 6 of the tram of Basel operated as the urban tram of Lörrach. Lörrach has some local and regional bus connections. They belong to the Regio Verkehrsverbund Lörrach. The nearest international airport, the EuroAirport Basel-Mulhouse-Freiburg, is 14 km away from Lörrach.

=== Administrative bodies, organisations and courts ===
Lörrach as a district accommodates the district administration office and a highway maintenance depot. Lörrach has several schools of all school types plus a Folk high school, a municipal library with over 65,000 books, a scientific regional library, a school of music, and two other smaller libraries. The local court of Lörrach is responsible for cities and municipalities in the district. Furthermore, there is a labour court in Lörrach, which constitutes the first jurisdiction for the districts of Lörrach and Waldshut. In addition there are three Superior Courts of Justice in Radolfzell am Bodensee. Lörrach also has a tax office, a labour office, a motorway police (German: Autobahnpolizei), and a criminal investigation department. Lörrach's hospital opened on 1 October 1845, at that time as an urban infirmary. On 1 January 1994 the three hospitals of Lörrach, Rheinfelden, and Schopfheim were pooled into a GmbH. Today the hospital of Lörrach has 351 beds.

=== Companies in Lörrach ===
One of the most well-known companies and employers in Lörrach is the chocolate manufacturer Mondelez Deutschland GmbH & Co. KG, well known for the brand of chocolate confectionary Milka and Suchard. Lörrach was the home of the GABA Deutschland GmbH, a pharmaceutical company that produced the famous elmex, meridol and aronal toothpaste. Colgate-Palmolive acquired Gaba's parent company Gaba Holding AG in 2004 and closed down the Lörrach-based factory in 2012.

Other companies of note:

- KBC Fashion GmbH & Co. KG, textile finishing company
- Tally Weijl Retail Germany GmbH, the German arm of the Basel based fashion label
- A. Raymond GmbH & Co. KG, the German arm of the international engineering group
- Streck Transportges. mbH, Transport & Logistics company
- Midro Lörrach GmbH, pharmaceutical company
- Migros, headquarters of Migros Germany
- Brauerei Lasser GmbH, brewery with 70 employees

=== Media ===
==== Print media ====
Two daily newspapers are based in Lörrach and have a local editorial office: Badische Zeitung and Die Oberbadische. Die Oberbadische (formerly Oberbadisches Volksblatt), published in the city, is Lörrach's oldest newspaper (founded 1885). In addition the Oberbadische Verlagshaus publishes the two newspapers Weiler Zeitung und Markgräfler Tagblatt. The city magazine Puls is published monthly and reports on events in and around Lörrach.

==== Broadcast and television ====
The radio programme of Südwestrundfunk has a regional office in Lörrach. There they produce parts of the radio program SWR4 Baden-Württemberg.

== Culture ==
Lörrach is the home to an annual voice festival (Stimmen) that takes place in early summer, in 2010 from 14 July to 8 August. The festival has many venues in and around Lörrach including Weil am Rhein. The motto of the festival is "Passion that sounds" (German: Leidenschaft, die klingt) (alternate translation: "Passion you can hear"). The festival exists since 1994.

== Twin towns – sister cities ==
Lörrach is twinned with:

- Sens, France (1966)
- Senigallia, Italy (1986)
- Village-Neuf, France (1988)
- Meerane, Germany (1990)
- Chester, United Kingdom (2002)

Annually, numerous meetings and exchanges between schools and associations take place. The Hebel Gymnasium School in Lörrach takes part in an annual school exchange with The Mountbatten School in Romsey, England. With Vyshhorod in Ukraine exists a friendly connection. In 2004 Loerrach International was created, an association for the advancement of the partnerships between cities and international friendships. In 2005 a cultural partnership was substantiated with Edirne in Turkey.

== Notable people ==
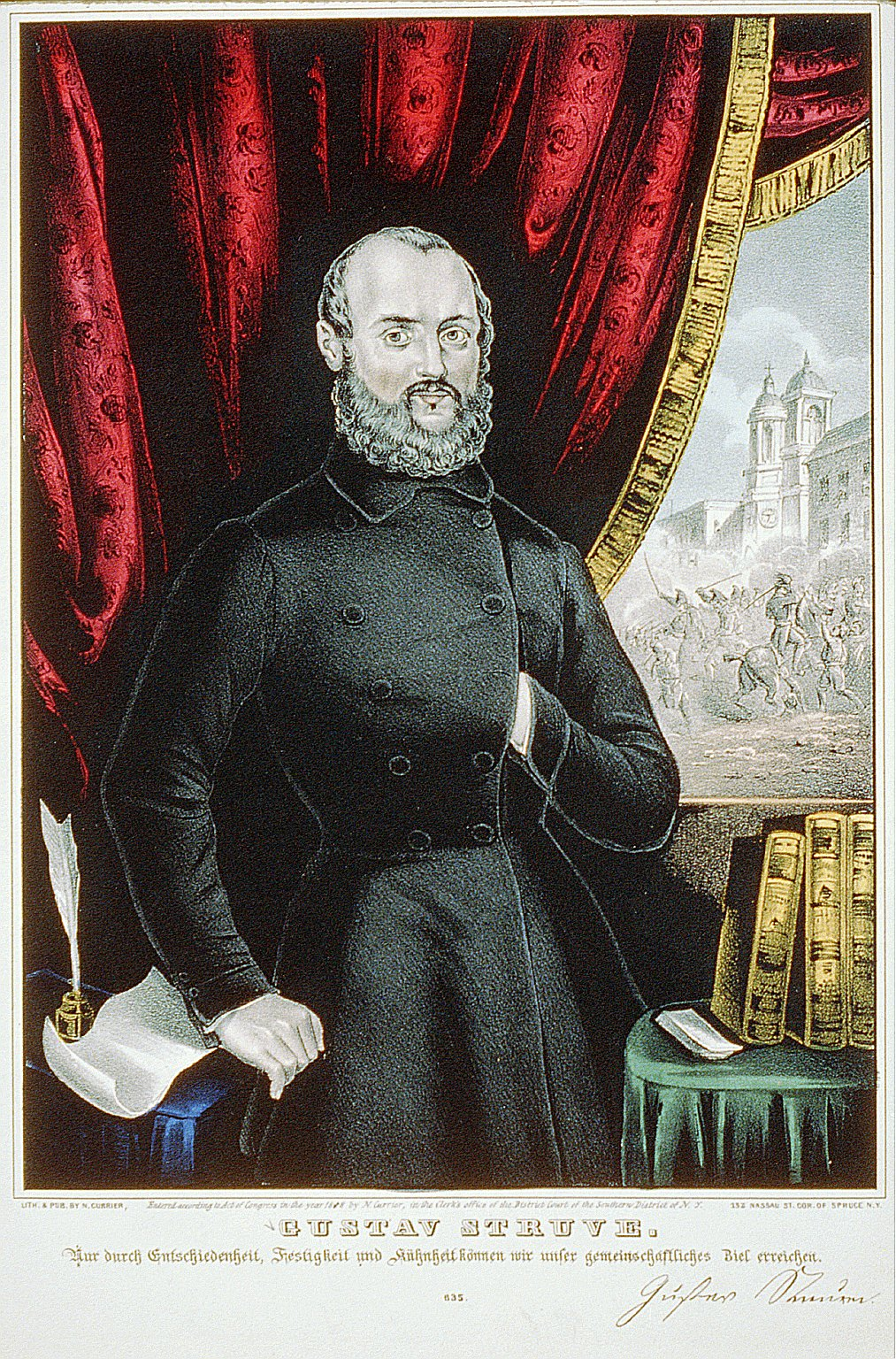
Gustav Struve, 1848

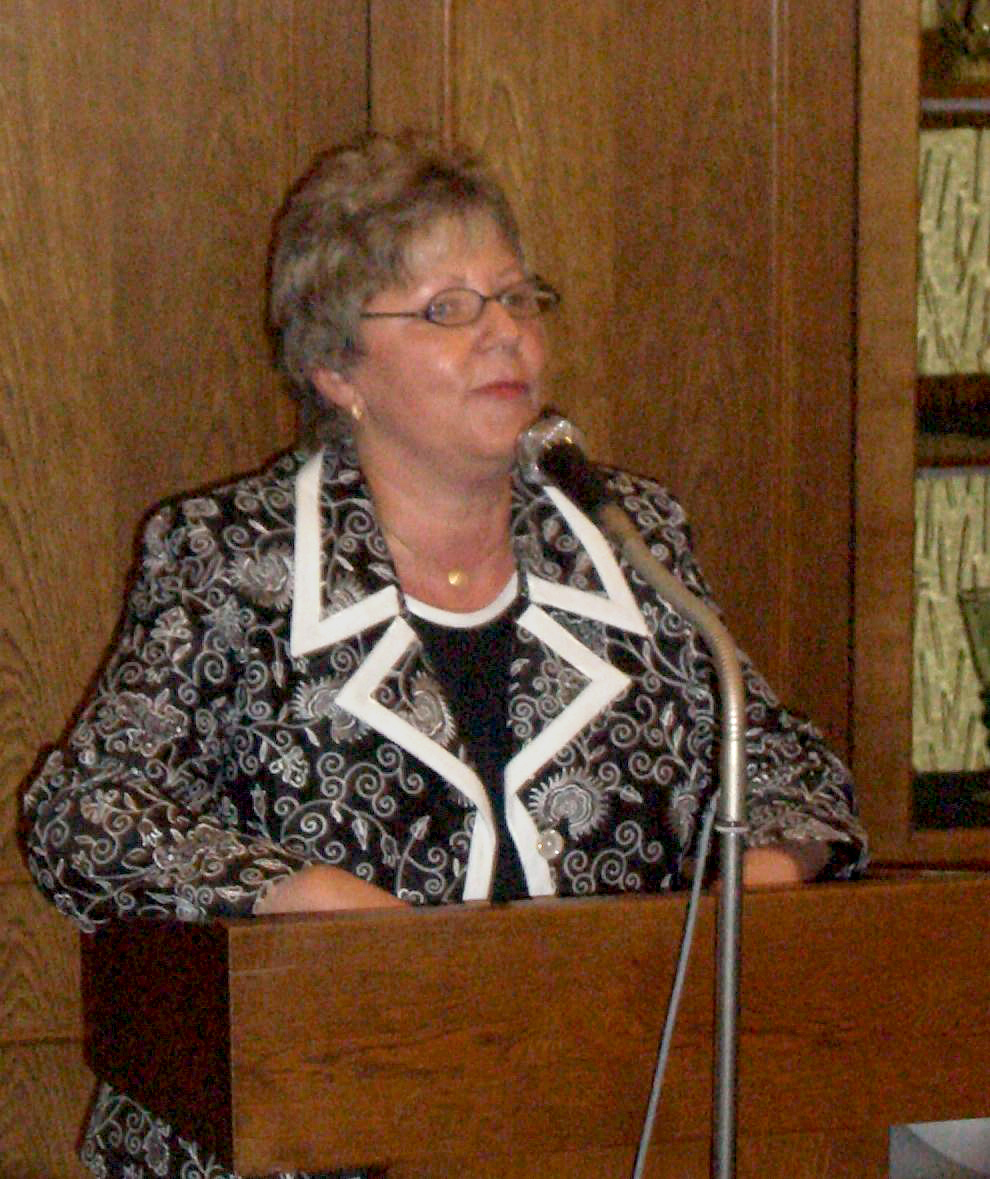
Marion Caspers-Merk, 2005

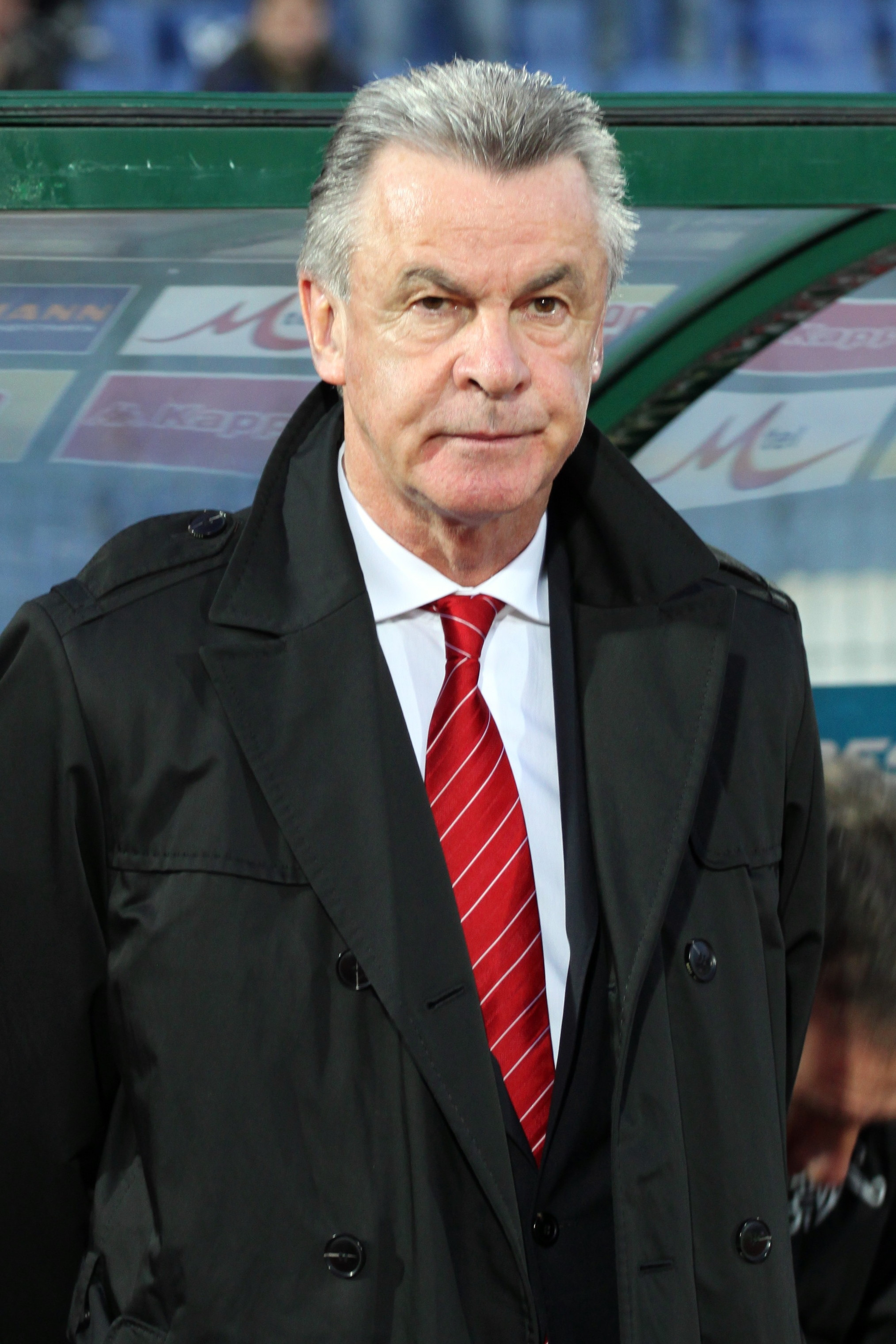
Ottmar Hitzfeld, 2011

- Johann Peter Hebel (1760–1826), short story writer and poet, local teacher.
- Gustav Hugo (1764–1807), jurist, born locally
- Friedrich Eisenlohr (1805–1854), architect and university professor, born locally; he designed a train station cuckoo clock
- Gustav Struve (1805–1870), surgeon
- Ferdinand Hitzig (1807–1875), biblical critic.
- Max Laeuger (1864–1952), architect, artist, and ceramicist, born and died locally
- Käte Duncker (1871–1953), a German political and feminist activist, born locally
- Manfred G. Raupp (born 1941), agricultural scientist and economist
- Martin Kunzler (born 1947), jazz bassist and music journalist.
- Marion Caspers-Merk (born 1955), local politician (SPD)
- Theodor Sproll (born 1957), social and economical scientist, local university rector
- Jörg Kachelmann (born 1958), Swiss presenter in the meteorological field
- Roland Wiesendanger (born 1961), nanoscience physicist, grew up locally
- Davide Martello (born 1981), pianist of Italian descent, born locally.
- Dominic Fritz (born 1983), politician born locally, mayor of Timișoara in Romania
- Butrint Imeri (born 1996), Kosovo-Albanian singer and dancer, born locally

=== Sport ===
- Ottmar Hitzfeld (born 1949), football player (scored 300 goals) and manager, born locally,
- Sebastian Deisler (born 1980), footballer, born locally
- Melanie Behringer (born 1985), former footballer, born locally
- Simon Niepmann (born 1985), rower; gold medallist at the 2016 Summer Olympics in the men's lightweight four
- Fabio Viteritti (born 1993), footballer, has played over 320 games
- Christina Shakovets (born 1994), tennis player, born locally

== See also ==
- Rötteln Castle
- Lörrach sculpture path
- Tüllinger Berg
