= Gudrun Heute-Bluhm =

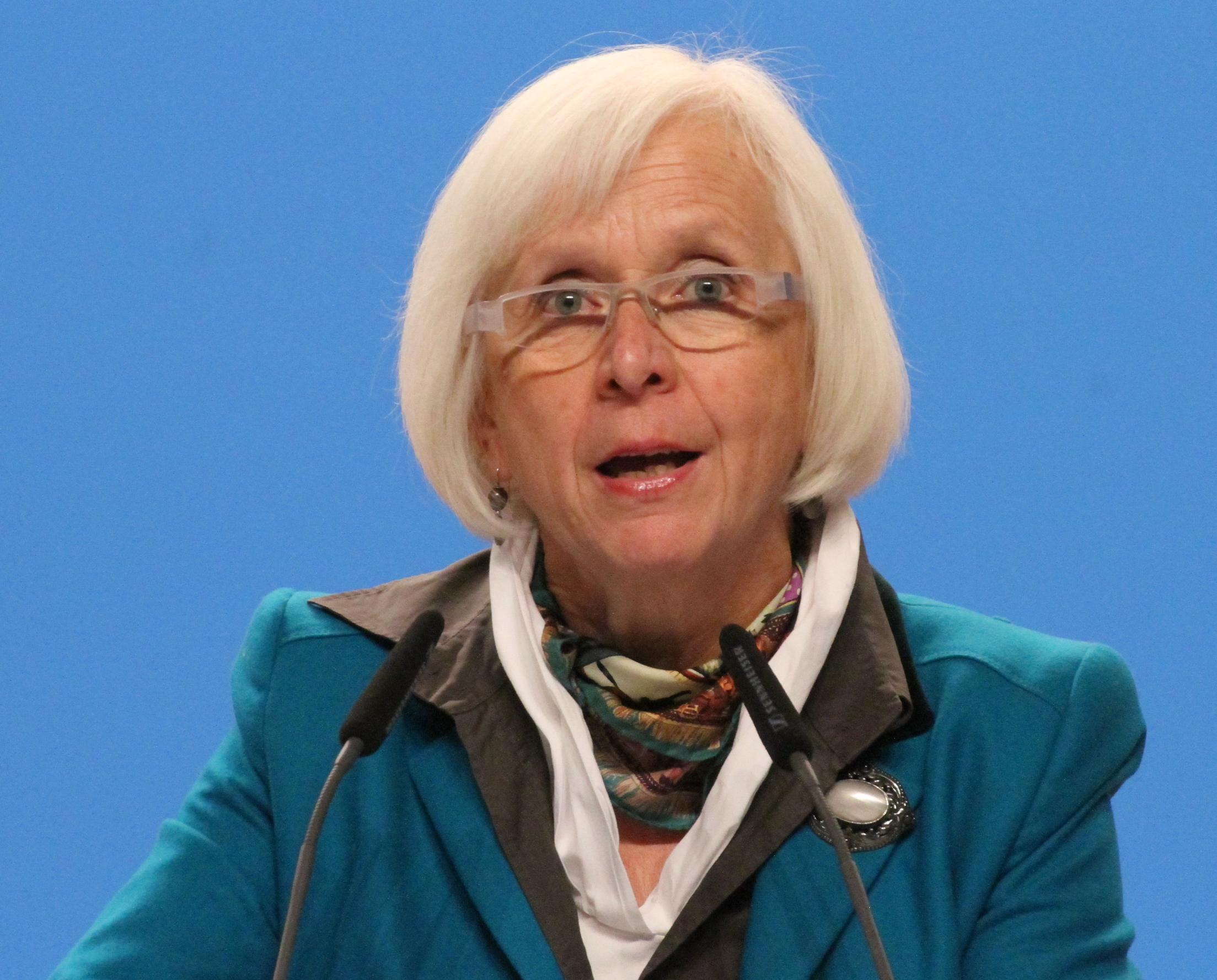
Heute-Bluhm at the CDU party conference in 2014

Gudrun Heute-Bluhm (born March 17, 1957, in Herne) is a German municipal politician of the CDU. She is a member of the executive committee of the city council of Lörrach, Baden-Württemberg and a member of the federal executive committee of the CDU Germany.

From 1995 to 2014 she was Lord Mayor of the town Lörrach and from 2004 to 2014 President of Loerrach International.

== Publications ==
- Das Dreiländereck – Identität aus Sein und Bewußtsein. In: Badische Zeiten. Redaktion: Hilmar Höhn und Christian Oster. Freiburg im Breisgau: Verlag der Badischen Zeitung, 1999, 264, VIII S., ISBN 3-00-005025-6.
- Gudrun Heute-Bluhm, Uwe Vorkötter: Risikokommunikation und Umweltbewußtsein. Die Rolle der Medien. In: Ulrich Müller (Hrsg.): Umwelt und Verkehr. Anstöße – vor Ort. Beiträge zu umwelt- und verkehrspolitischen Themen in Zusammenarbeit mit Kommunen des Landes Baden-Württemberg. Ministerium für Umwelt und Verkehr Baden-Württemberg. Göppingen: Rung, 2000, 178 S.
