= Tally Weijl =

Swiss fashion label (company)

Tally Weijl Trading AG
- Company type: Privately held company
- Industry: Clothing, retail
- Founded: 1984
- Headquarters: Basel, Switzerland
- Products: Clothing; Accessories
- Website: tally-weijl.com

Tally Weijl (stylized as TALLY WEiJL) is a fashion label based in Basel, Switzerland. The company is represented worldwide in 37 countries with over 780 stores and employs over 3,400 people (as of February 2015). Tally Weijl was founded in 1984 by Tally Elfassi-Weijl and Beat Grüring. In 2017, Tally Weijl acquired the 69 stores of the French fashion company Mim.

The company's headquarters, the so-called "campus", is located in Basel. The collections were mostly created in Paris until 2016, since then the Design Center has also been in Basel, together with the Service & Support Center. Only one trend team remained in the French fashion metropolis.

The distribution centers are located in Lörrach for Central and Eastern Europe, in Zofingen for Switzerland and in Milan for the southern European market. The points of sale are supplied from there. Tally Weijl manages half of all retail spaces itself, while the rest are run by franchise partners. Tally Weijl generated sales of around CHF 420 million in 2015.

== Store count ==
Number of Tally Weijl stores as of 16 March 2019:

Africa

- Egypt: 3
- South Africa: 2
- Libya: 1
- Reunion: 2

Americas

- Guatemala: 2

Asia

- Iran: 3
- Saudi Arabia: 8
- Lebanon: 6
- Turkey: 4
- Jordan: 1
- Mongolia: 1

Europe

- Italy: 202
- Germany: 130
- Switzerland: 71
- Austria: 41
- Greece: 41
- Poland: 36
- Czech Republic: 16
- Hungary: 22
- France: 125
- Ukraine: 14
- Slovenia: 9
- Croatia: 8
- Portugal: 5
- Serbia: 6
- Cyprus: 5
- Bulgaria: 6
- Lithuania: 2
- Luxembourg: 5
- Ireland: 1
- Kosovo: 1
- North Macedonia: 1
- Russia: 1
- Estonia: 3
- Moldova: 1
