= Lörrach sculpture path =

The Lörrach Sculpture Path (Lörracher Skulpturenweg) is a Sculpture trail of 23 works and fountains through the southern German city of Lörrach.

In 1986 extensive urban planning changes were made in the city. A busy main road was decommissioned in favour of a pedestrian street. The city was transformed with the goal of making Lörrach into a culturally attractive town in the Swiss-French-German border region. The sculpture trail, with works by both international and local artists, was commissioned. The route begins at the cultural centre Burghof Lörrach with a truncated pyramid by Bruce Nauman. The trail takes a circular route past Dreiländermuseum, the town hall and the market.

== Sculptures and Fountains ==
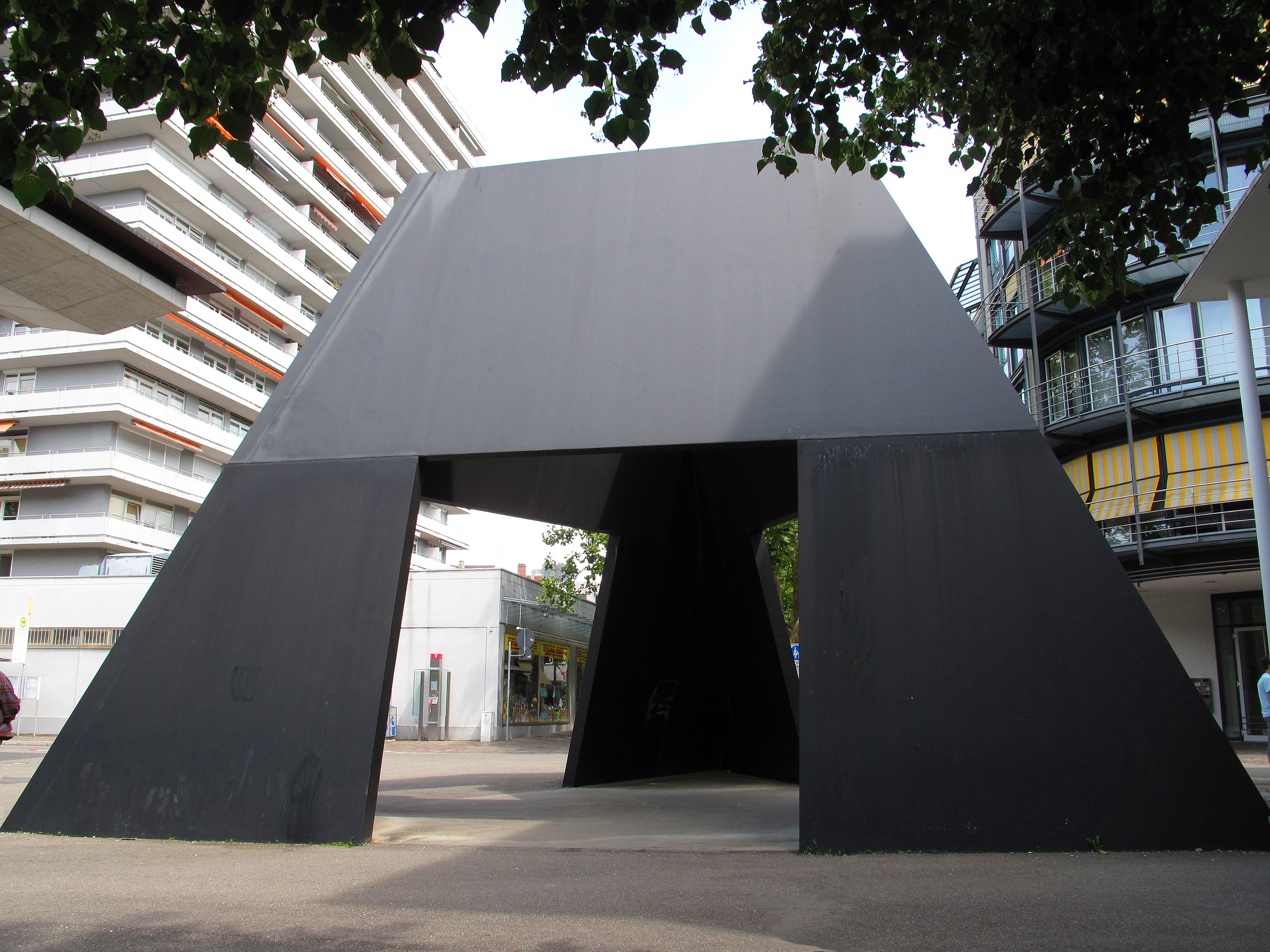
Bruce Nauman, Truncated Pyramid Room

The fountains and sculptures are given below in the order that they appear along pathway.

1. Bruce Nauman, Truncated Pyramid Room, (concept 1982/installed 1998): The Pyramid of North American artist on the courtyard is a matte black, 7.5 meter high walk-truncated pyramid. This sculpture is issued Naumann's first work in Europe, it is illuminated at night with a bright yellow light.
2. Rudolf Scheurer, Sonnengesichter (Sun faces), (2003): In front of the city museum there are three cast aluminum faces of local artists.
3. Beatrix Sassen, Licht im Kopf (Light in the head), (2002): A 3.2 metre high, cast aluminum sculpture on the Meeraner place.
4. Ralf John Kratz, Suche der Stadt Bestes (Search the city best), (2002): Unveiled in May as part of the 900th anniversary of the city.
5. Konrad Winzer, Existenzielle Not (Existential distress), (1996): Situated between the town church and the rectory, the crouching and bent far forward figure of the artist Lörracher symbolises the suffering of Jewish families in National Socialism.
6. Urs Bargetzi, Marktbrunnen (Crown fountain), (1827): On the southern edge of the pedestrian zone (corner Basel Street / Lord Street) is the fountain of the Swiss artist. The name commemorates the site of the former Crown Inn.
7. Lasse Brander, Tendenz steigend, (And rising), (1997): The sculpture is by the Swedish artist at the Old Market Square.
8. Franz Häring, Brunnenanlage am Alten Markt (Fountain at the Old Market) (1995): Located in the west branch off from the Old Market Street. On the floor is a strip of green serpentine admitted that glows in the evening along with the fountain.
9. Urs Bargetzi, Marktbrunnen (Market Fountain), (1838): It is a replica of a fountain on the Münsterberg in Basel.

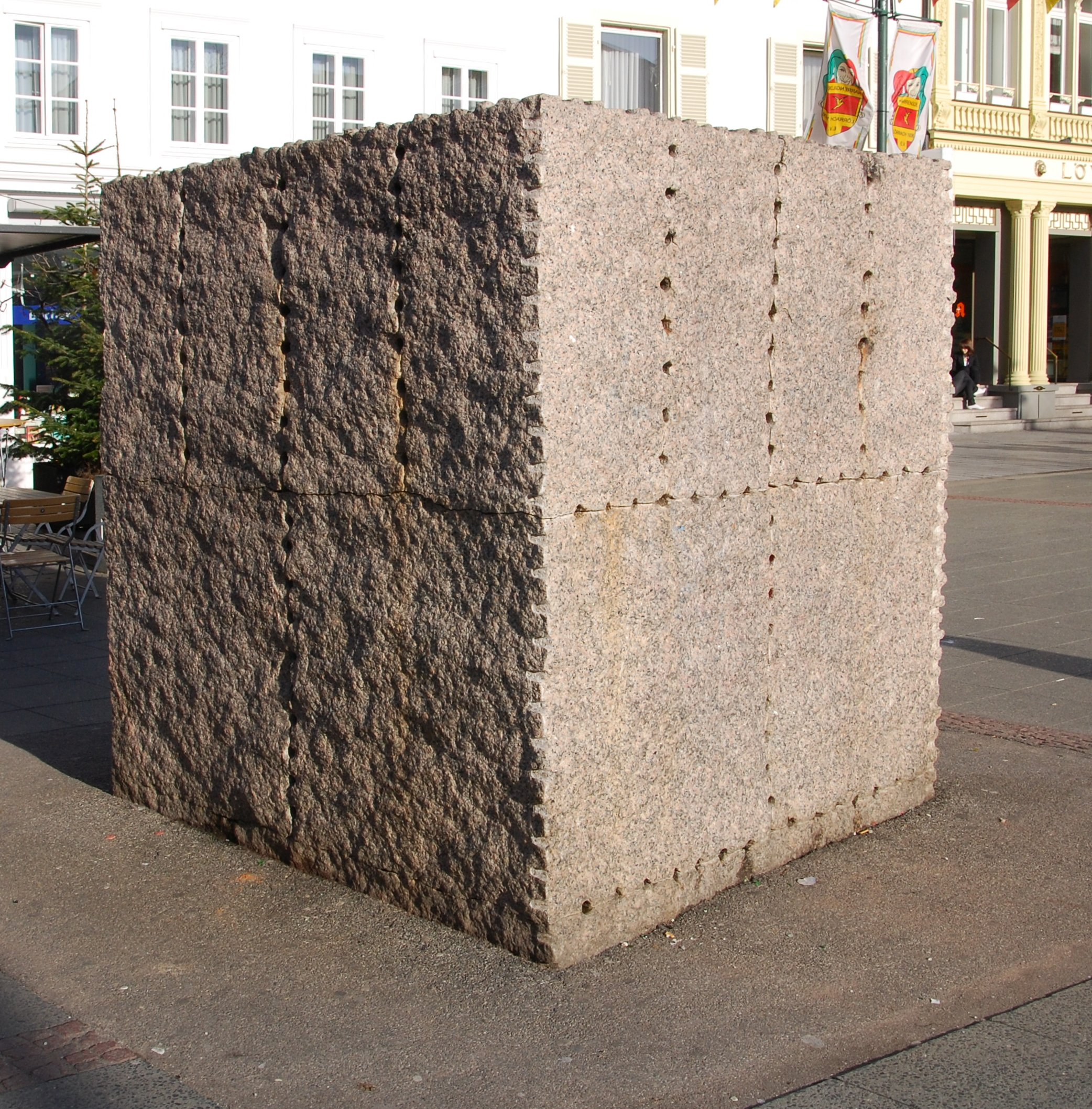
Ulrich Rückriem, Granit Rosa Porriño

1. Ulrich Rückriem, Granit Rosa Porriño (Granite Pink Porrino) (1996): The cube-shaped sculpture is centered on the intersection of the Old Market Square. The stone deliberately has holes, cracks and gaps.
2. Urs Bargetzi, Hirschenbrunnen (Deer fountain) (1827): The third fountain of Bargetzi shows in the trough the city's coat of Lörrach. Behind the trough rises a classical column. The name recalls the former Hirschen hotel.
3. Wilhelm Gerstel, Hebeldenkmal (Lever monument) (1910): In the park there is a larger-than-life sized sculpture of the poet Johann Peter Hebel.
4. Karl-Henning Seemann, Der Heiner und der Brassenheimer Müller (The Heiner Müller and the Brass Heimer) (1980–82) is the pair well figure on the station square. It provides a thick Müller and rider galloping off thin (Heiner) representing the history of Johann Peter Hebel.
5. Giancarlo Sangregorio, Triade (Triad) (1976): Abstract stone sculpture in the square outside the town hall in Lörrach consisting of interlocking black-green and red Swedish granite. Not far away is: Jörg Bollin, Lebensquell - Brunnenskulptur (The source of life - Fountain sculpture) (1974). A fruit-shaped stone swells from the water.
6. Franz Bernhard, Lörracher Sitzende (Lörracher sitting) (1992): The figure, several metres in height, on a round lawn at the road underpass reminiscent of a graceful seated woman. The metal surface of the plastic was left unsealed and unpainted and is illuminated at night.
7. Max Laeuger, Keramik-Relief (Relief in ceramic), (1902): On the St. Boniface Church, the work in the Jugendstil shows the crucified Jesus with Mary and Joseph.
8. Franz Häring, Wolkenwaage (Cloud scale), (1997): Häring created from stone, steel and plexiglass the fountain sculpture on the Senigalliaplatz. In a pool of water, similar to a ship's hull, eight fountains are reminiscent of sails. A swinging bucket of water is poured twice per minute into the basin, which is meant to symbolize the water cycle. A square azure surface of Plexiglas with the motif of a cloudy sky gives its name to the fountain sculpture.
9. Nigel Hall, Lörrach Rising: On the west side of Lörrach District Office, is the work of this English sculptor. Hall works in the constructivism style.
10. Bernd Goering, 9 November (1976): Also in front of the District Office is the sculpture to the three important historical dates of 9 November - 1918, 1938 and 1989 - all of which are connected to a turning point in the history of Germany. In the two upright concrete sculpture of two diagonally crossing piers are flanked. Thus the Roman numerals IX and XI (9 and 11) are readable from both sides.
11. Stephan Balkenhol, Große Säulenfigur (Large pillars figure) (1996–97): On the Senser-Platz is a four-meter high red male figure from Douglas fir wood. The deliberately understated and average figure stands for the bourgeois contemporaries.
12. Bernd Goering, Unterbrochener Kreislauf der Natur (Interrupted cycle of nature), (1991): South of the Senser-Platz is this fountain with a broken steel ring that symbolises disturbing human intervention in nature.
13. Plaque with seven-chandeliers, (1976): In the synagogue alley between Pond Street and New Market reminds them of the former synagogue in Lörrach. In the Kristallnacht in 1938 the temple was destroyed.
14. Michael Fischer, Lebensbaum (Tree of Life) (1981): At the new marketplace a sculpture of a tree with a pair of lovers in the tree canopy protrudes from a water trough.

== Gallery ==
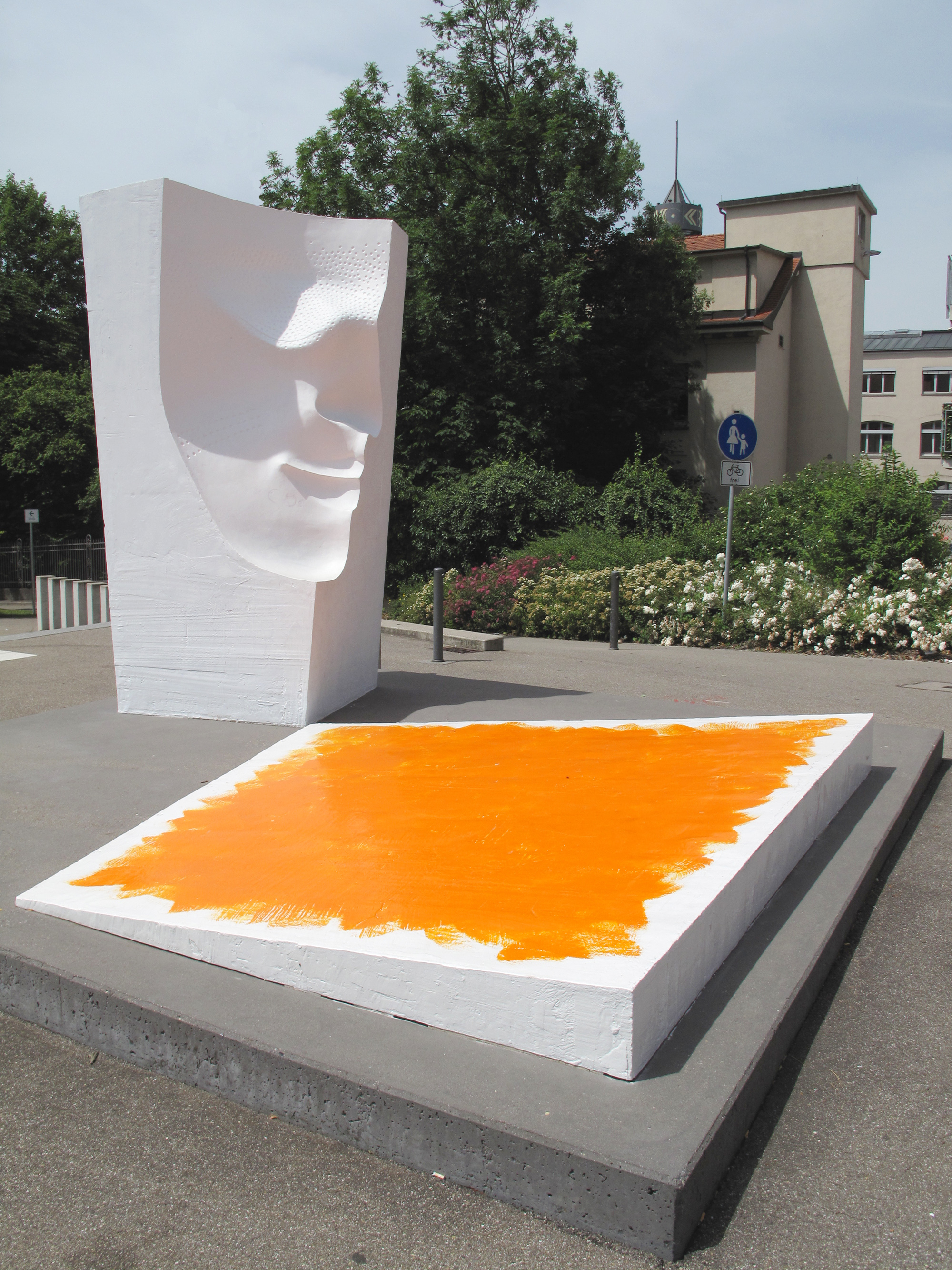
Licht im Kopf, Beatrix Sassen

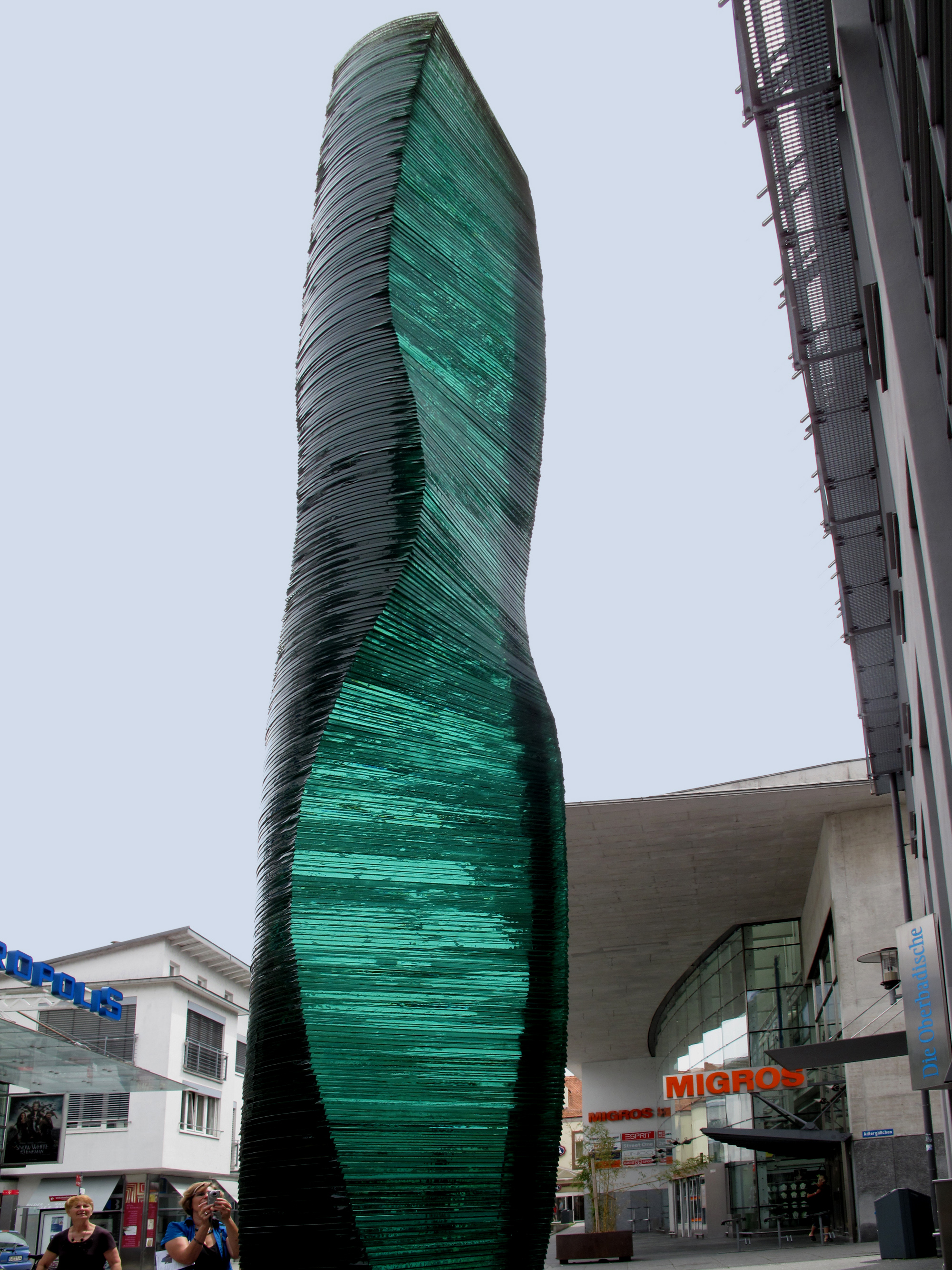
Tendenz steigend, Lasse Brander

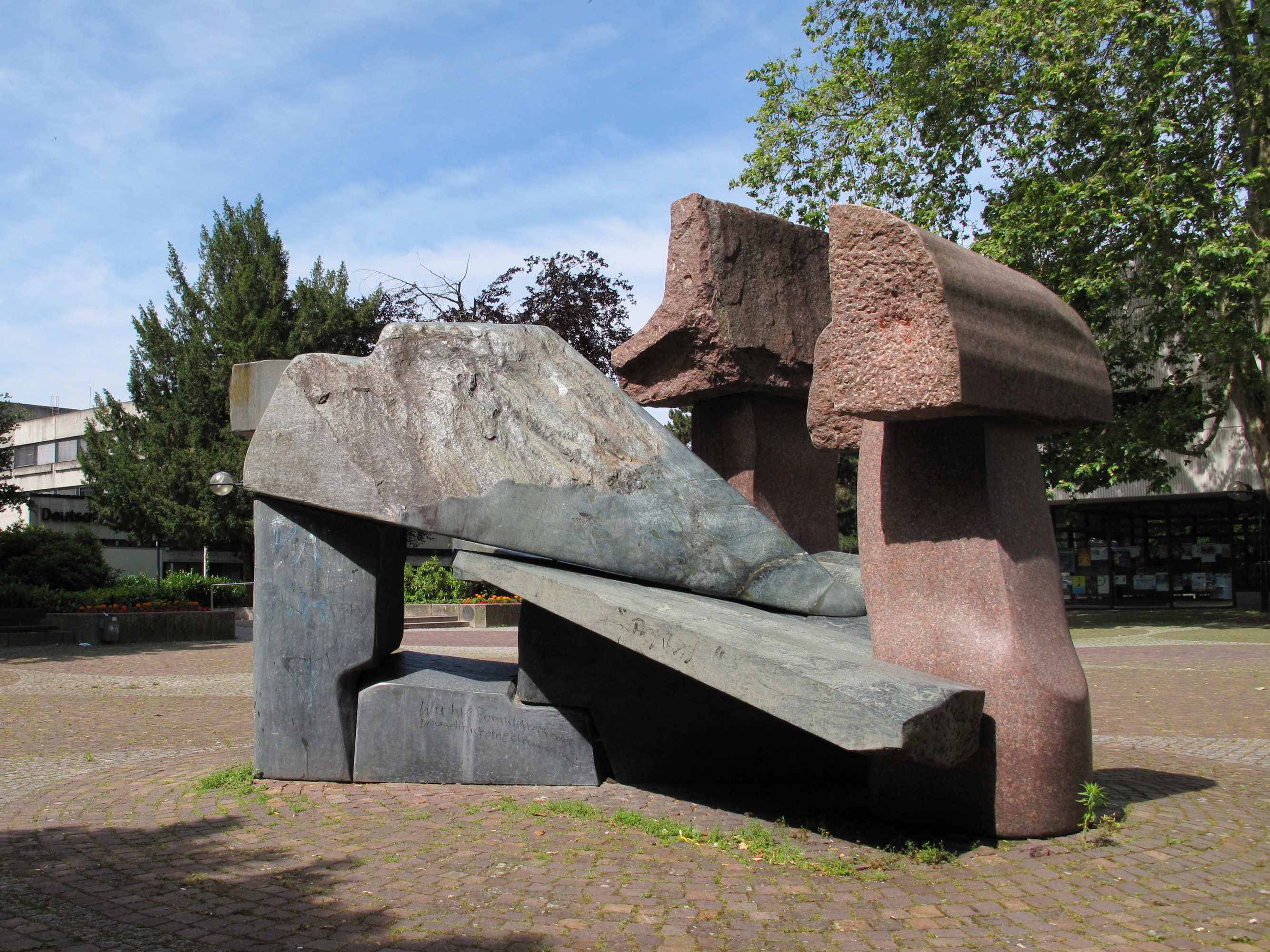
Triade, Giancarlo Sangregorio

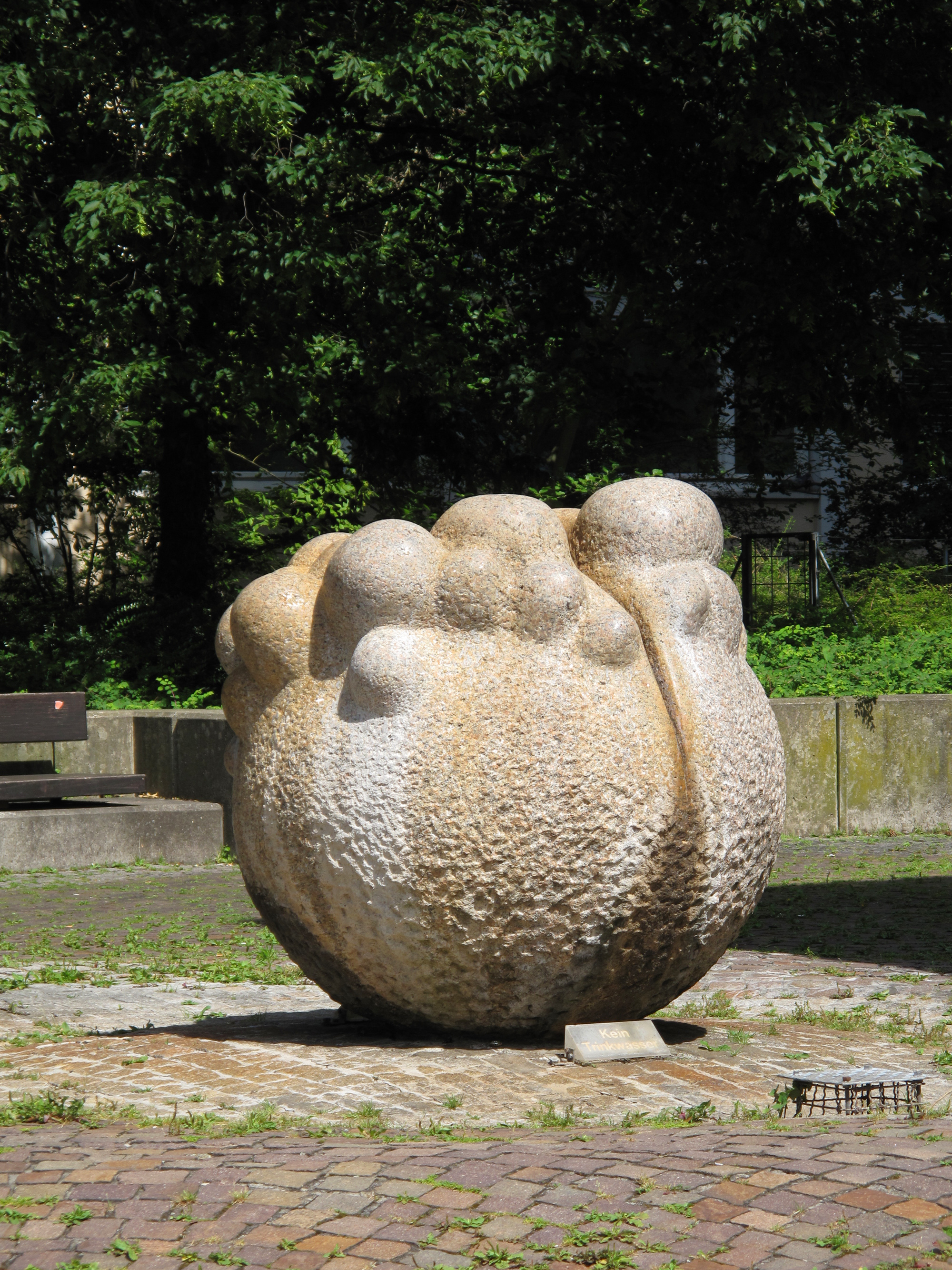
Lebensquell, Jörg Bollin

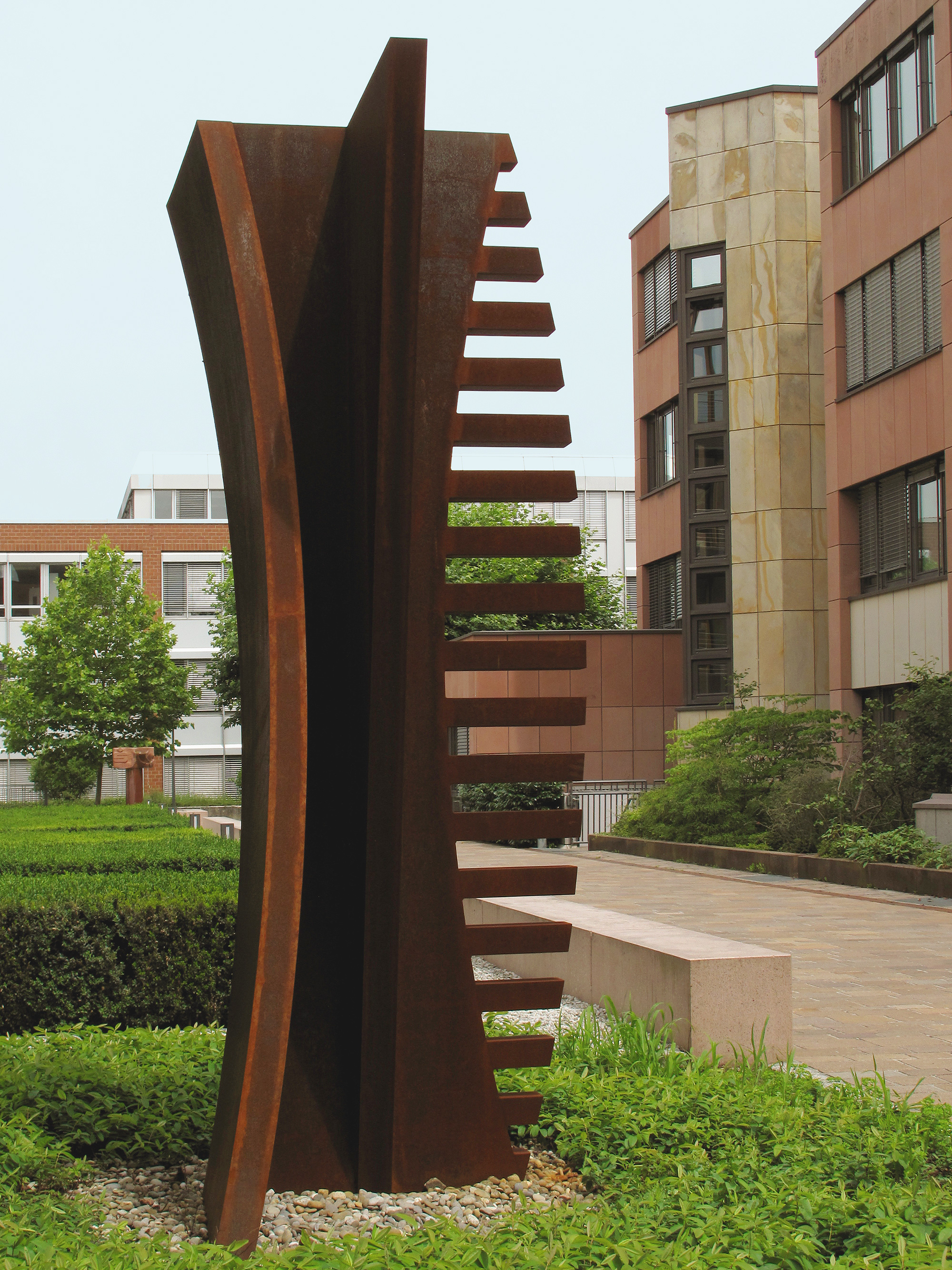
Lörrach rising, Nigel Hall

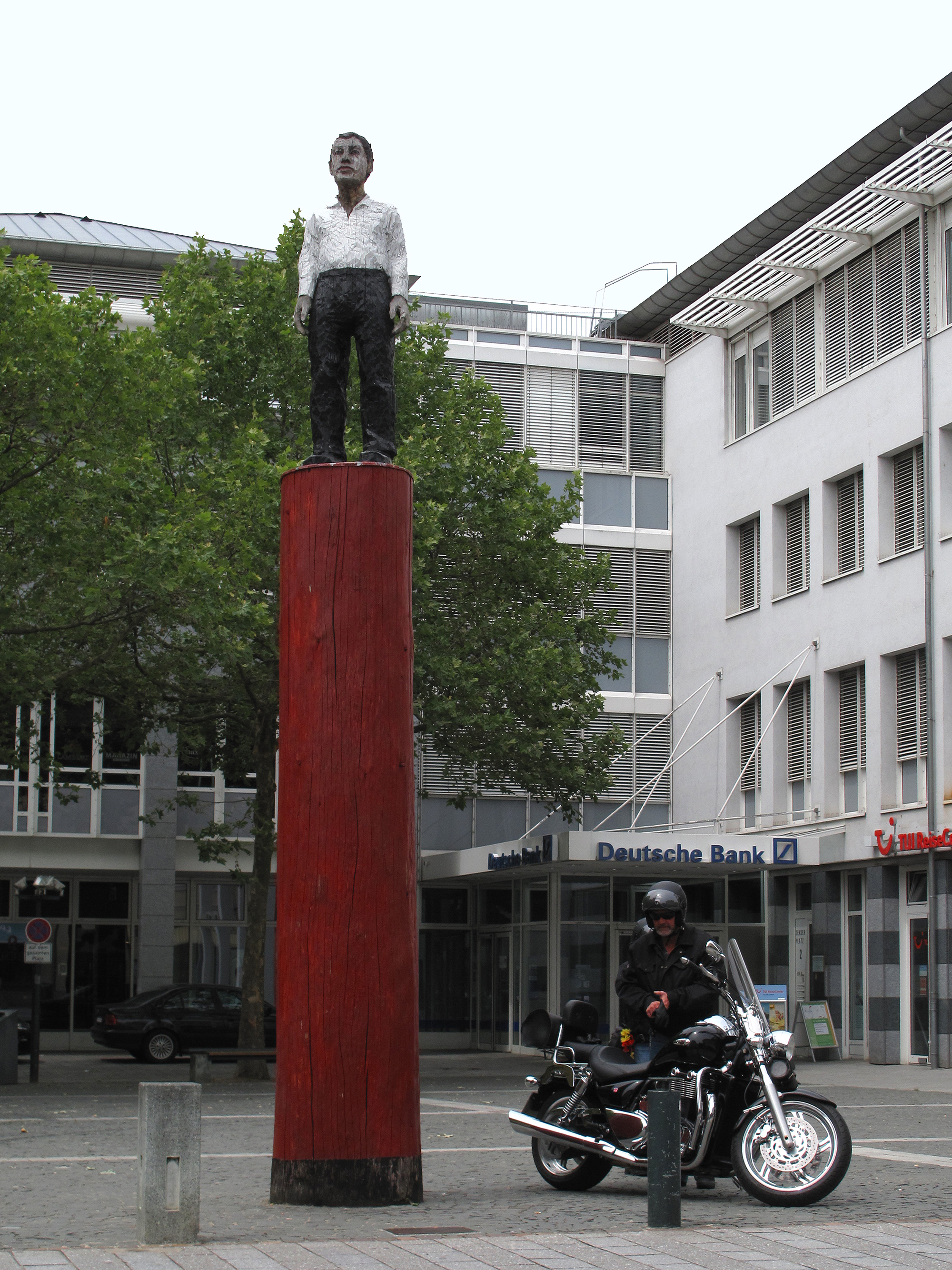
Große Säulenfigur, Stephan Balkenhol

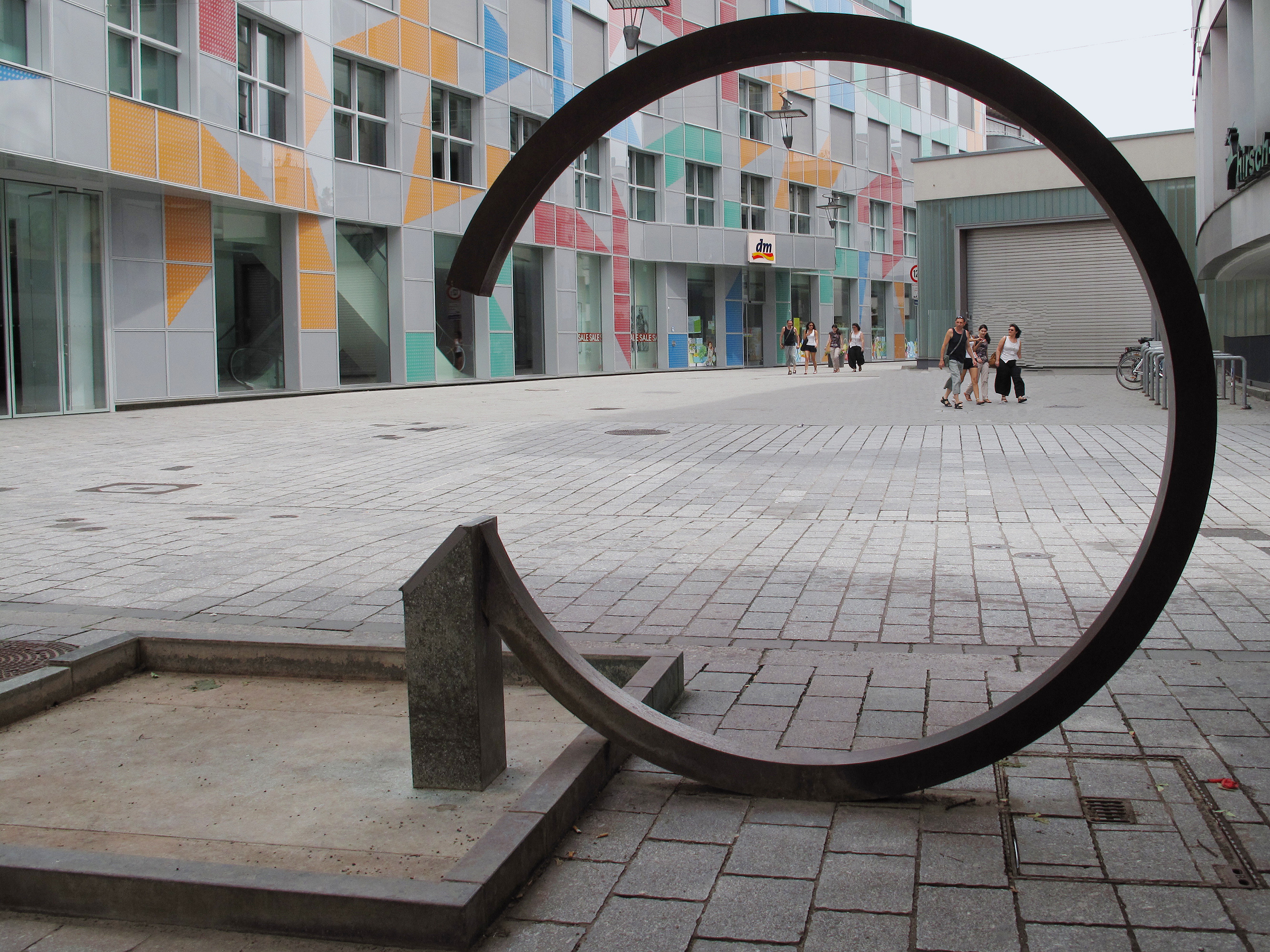
Unterbrochener Kreislauf, Bernd Goering

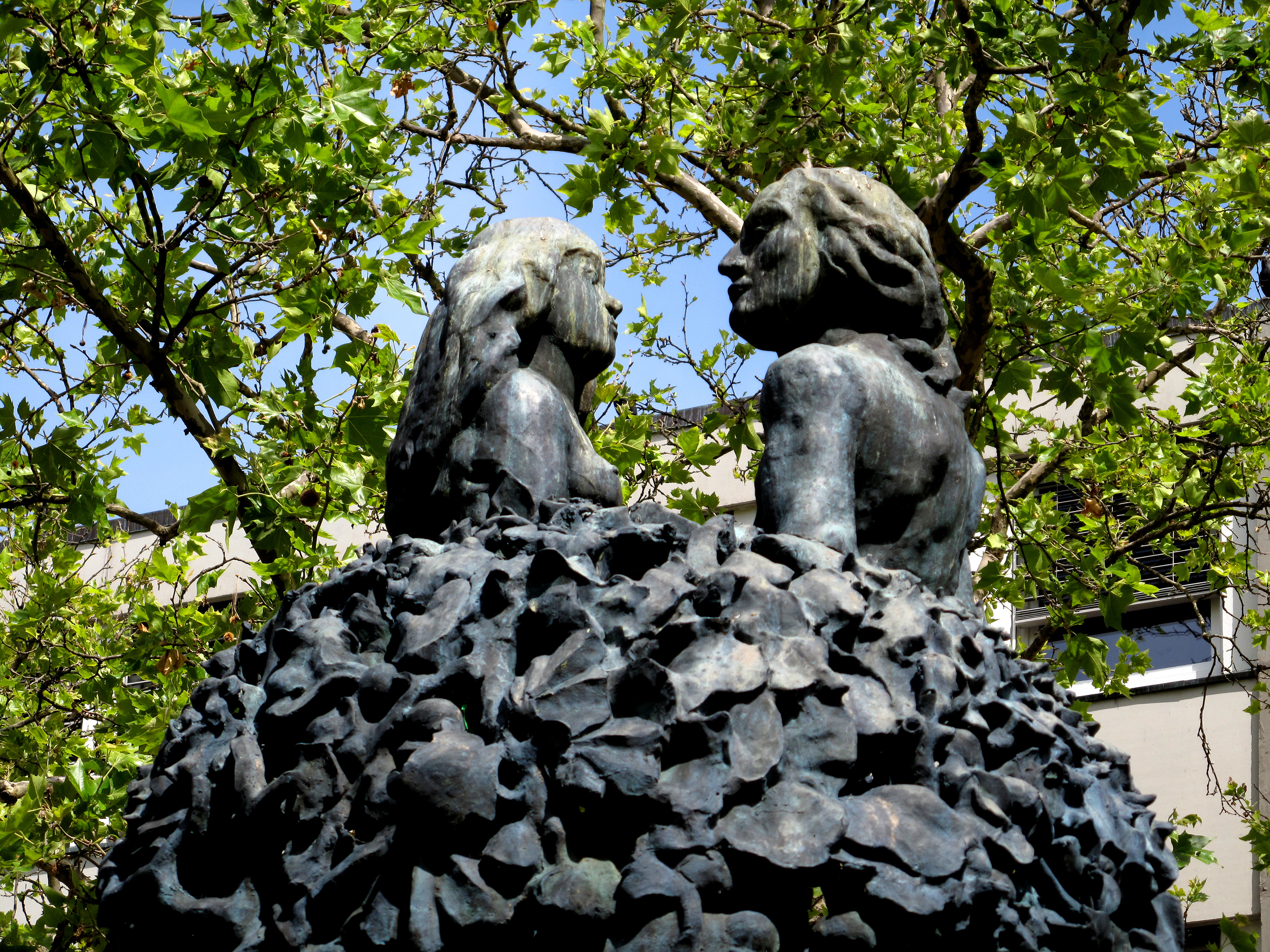
Lebensquell, Michael Fischer
