= Meerane =

- Town
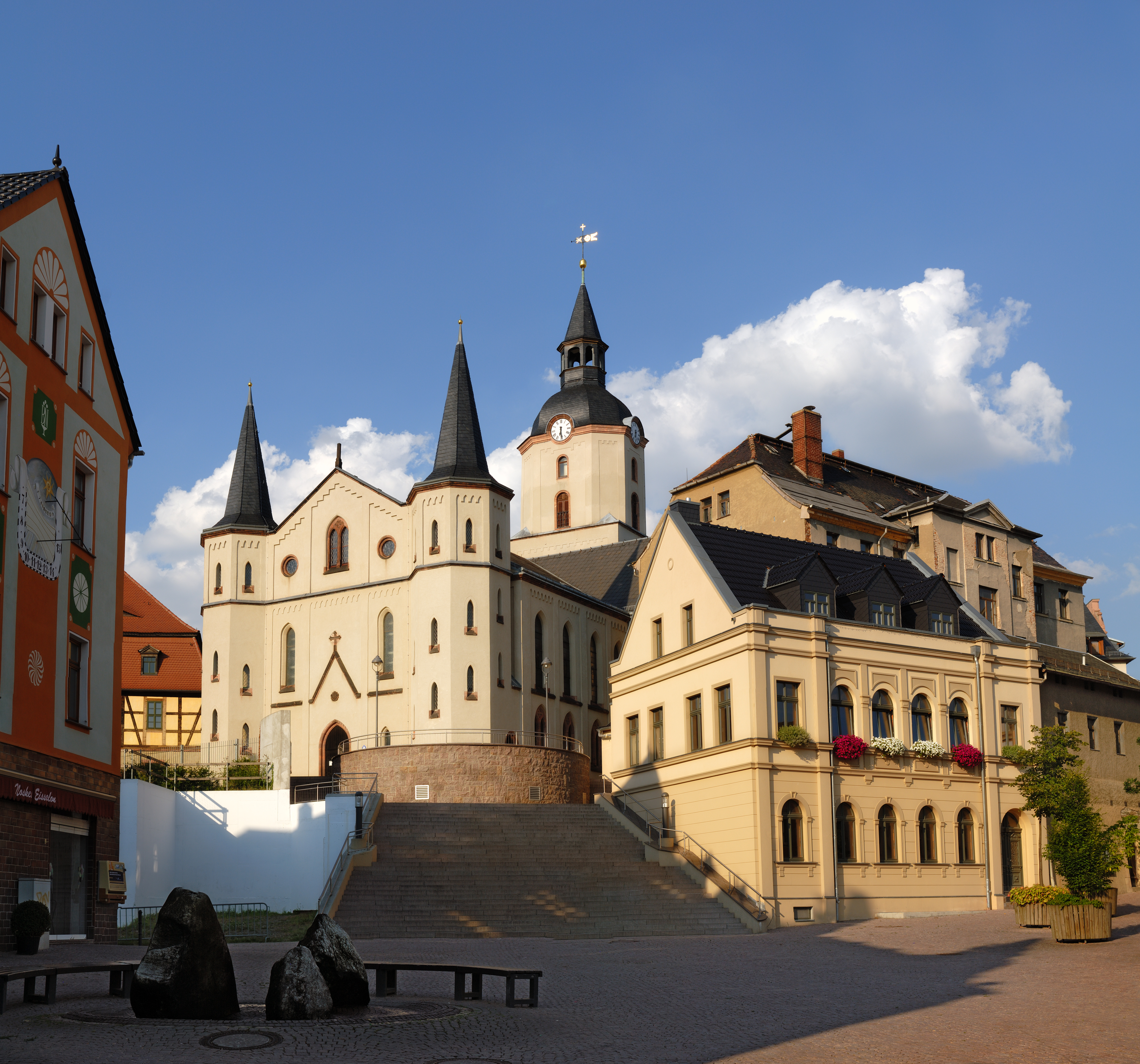
- Saint Martins Church

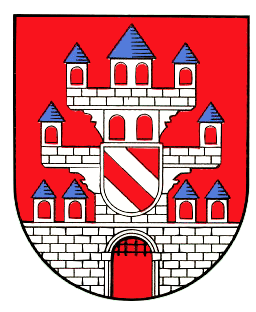
- Coat of arms

- Location of Meerane within Zwickau district
- Interactive map of Meerane
- Location within Germany Location within Saxony
- Coordinates: 50°51′7″N 12°27′49″E
- Country: Germany
- State: Saxony
- District: Zwickau
- Subdivisions: Kernstadt, 4 Ortsteile

Government
  - Mayor (2022–29): Jörg Schmeißer (CDU)

Area
  - Total: 19.81 km^{2} (7.65 sq mi)
- Elevation: 253 m (830 ft)

Population (2025-12-31)
  - Total: 13,708
  - Density: 692.0/km^{2} (1,792/sq mi)
- Time zone: UTC+01:00 (CET)
  - Summer (DST): UTC+02:00 (CEST)
- Postal codes: 08393
- Dialling codes: 03764
- Vehicle registration: Z
- Website: www.meerane.de

Meerane (German pronunciation: [meˈʁaːnə]) is a town in the Zwickau district of Saxony, Germany. It lies midway between the towns of Altenburg and Zwickau, west of Chemnitz.

As of 31 December 2015, there were 14,851 inhabitants. The population has declined from a peak of over 26,000 in the 1940s.

Meerane was once important for the manufacture of woollen and mixed cloths; associated industries such as dyeworks, tanneries and machine factories were also located there.

== History ==
The first documented mention of the settlement was in reference to the death of Bohemian king Vladislav II, who died in 1174 after a stay of four months at "Burg Mare".

The Sorbian word mer means "border", and the placename most likely refers to the borderlands between Slavic and Germanic speaking peoples at that time. The place also bordered the section of the Via Imperii between Altenburg and Zwickau.

== Population Development ==
In 1546 there were 193 inhabitants, in 1583 120 property holders and in 1750 100 houses in the town and 159 houses in the vicinity.

Historical population (from 1960 on 31 December):

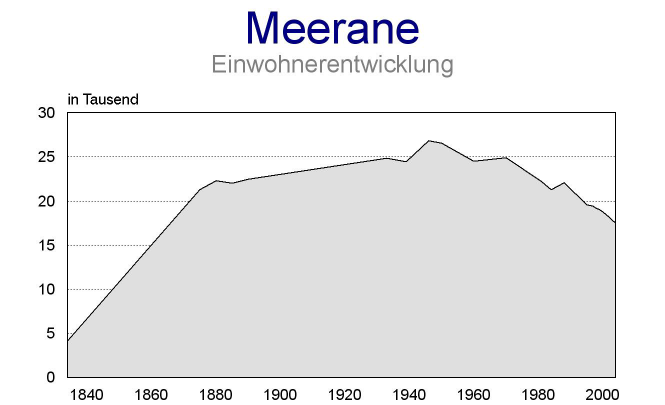
Historical population

1834 to 1946

- 1834 – 4,172
- 1875 – 21,277
- 1880 – 22,293
- 1885 – 22,013
- 1890 – 22,446
- 1910 – 25,470
- 1933 – 24,855
- 1939 – 24,447
- 1946 – 26,804

1950 to 2002

- 1950 – 26,519
- 1960 – 24,520
- 1981 – 22,194
- 1984 – 21,260
- 1995 – 19,606
- 1997 – 19,390
- 1999 – 19,001
- 2001 – 18,439
- 2002 – 18,173

2003 to 2012

- 2003 – 17,745
- 2004 – 17,513
- 2005 – 17,244
- 2006 – 16,937
- 2007 – 16,752
- 2008 – 16,517
- 2009 – 16,287
- 2010 – 16,115
- 2011 – 15,942
- 2012 – 15,226

from 2013

- 2013 – 15,003
- 2014 – 14,850
- 2015 – 14,851
- 2016 – 14,659
- 2017 – 14,481
- 2018 – 14,208
- 2019 – 14,001
- 2020 – 13,934

Data source from 1998: Statistics Bureau of Saxony

== Transportation ==
Meerane station is the train station of the parish.

=== Religion ===
Since the time of the Reformation, the population is principally Evangelical-Lutheran. In 1925, 22,576 inhabitants identified as Evangelisch, 14 as Reformed Church, 260 als Roman Catholic, 17 Jews and 1,227 as "other".

== Attractions ==
- There are several parks: Wilhelm-Wunderlich Park, Annapark, Schillerpark
- The city hall was built in 1727, and has been completely restored
- The Lutheran church of St. Martinskirche was first documented in 1314

== Twin town ==
- Loerrach, Loerrach International Germany

== People ==
- Friedrich Eduard Bilz
- Christian Ernst Friederici, instrument builder
- Ingo Hertzsch, footballer
- Richard Hofmann, footballer, German international (25 matches with 24 goals)
- Claudia Mahnke, operatic mezzo-soprano
