= Jörg Lutz =

German politician (born 1963)

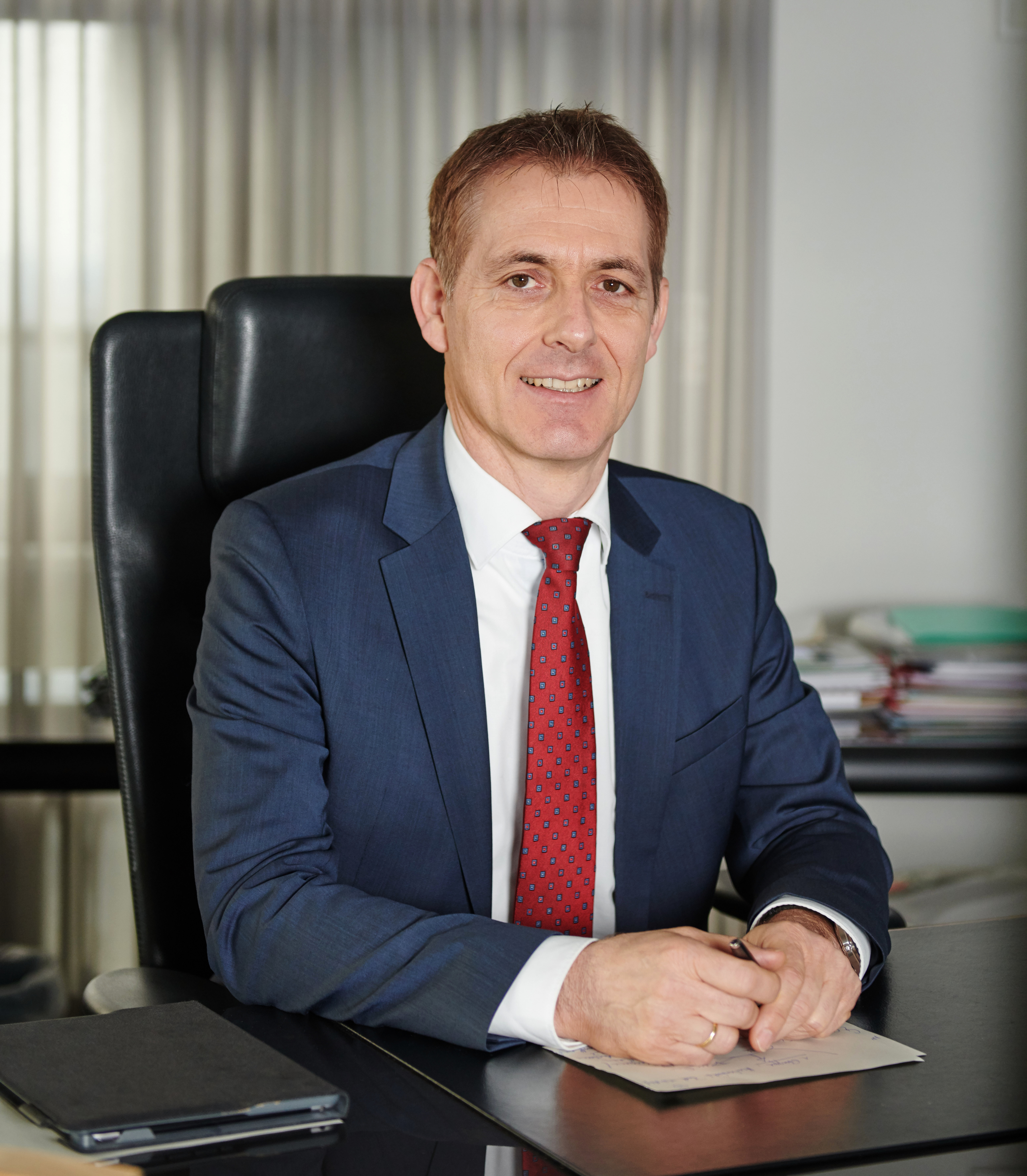
Jörg Lutz (2018)

Jörg Lutz (born 10 May 1963 in Calw, West Germany) is a German independent politician. On 20 July 2014, he was elected to mayor of the town of Lörrach in southern Germany. He officially took office on 1 October 2014.

== Life and work ==
After finishing school at the Albert-Schweitzer-Gymnasium Leonberg he performed community service from 1982 until 1984 in Leonberg hospital. From 1984 until 1989 he studied law at the University of Freiburg followed by an internship at the Oberlandesgericht Stuttgart. He also worked in a law firm in San Francisco.

From 1993 to 1995 Herr Lutz was legal counsel to the administration and local authority supervision at the Loerrach District Office. After a period of parental leave he was Commissioner for Social Affairs for the Loerrach area. In 1999 he was elected as mayor of the community of Grenzach-Wyhlen and in 2007 was re-elected. In 2009 he was awarded the Theodor-Heuss-Medaille for exemplary civil dialogue.

When the incumbent mayor of Loerrach, Gudrun Heute-Bluhm, resigned at the beginning of 2014 Jörg Lutz offered himself for election, together with four other candidates. In the first round of the election on 6 July Joerg Lutz gained 40.9% and in the second round he was elected as mayor with 64,4 % of the votes. He started as Mayor of Lörrach on the 1 October 2014 and was confirmed in the election on July 3, 2022 with 86.7 % for a second term.

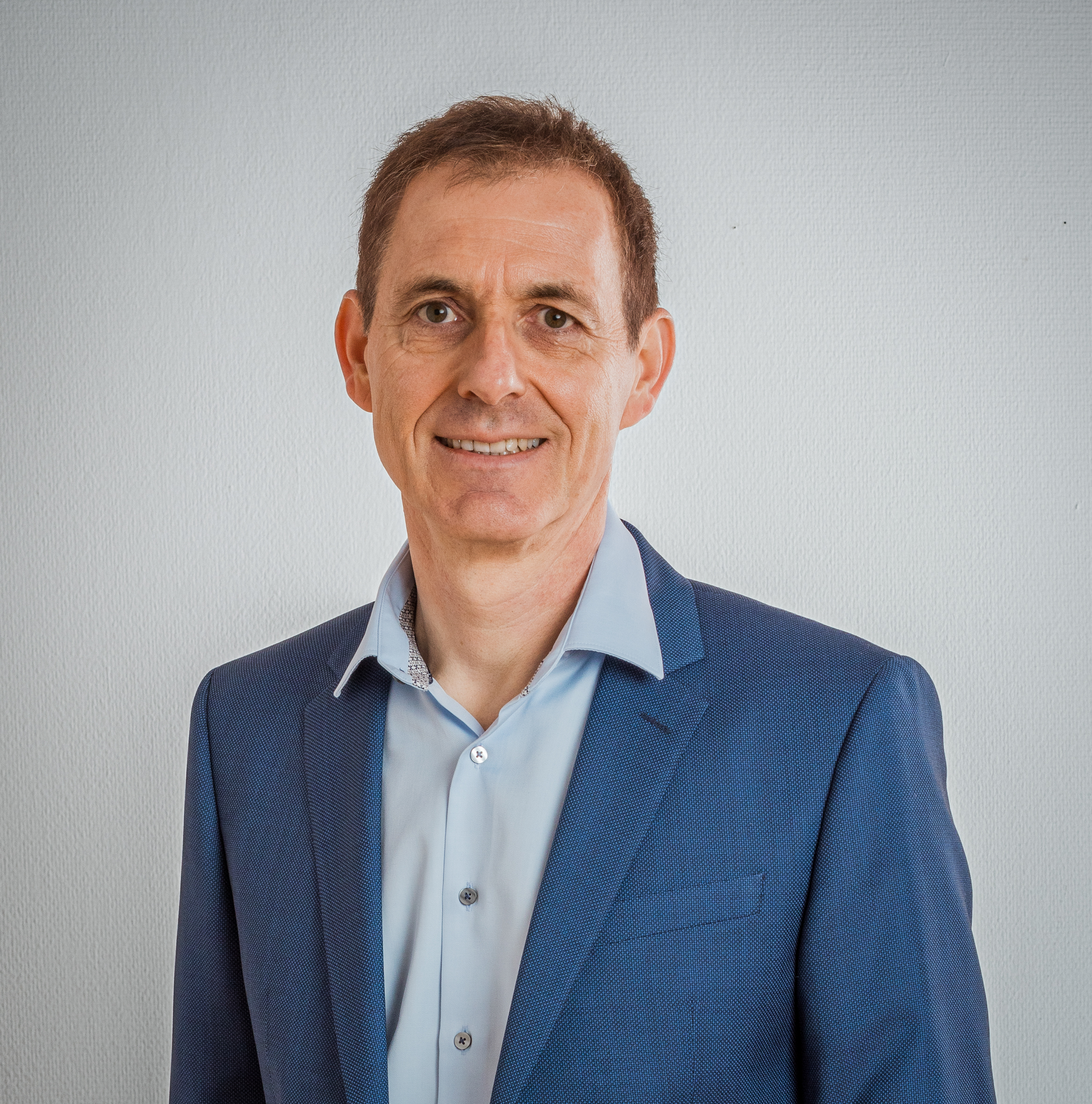
Jörg Lutz (2022)

Joerg Lutz is married and has two daughters.

== Further Commitments ==
- Chairman of the Board of Directors of Sparkasse Lörrach-Rheinfelden
- Member of the district council of the district of Lörrach
- Member of the board of the Trinational Eurodistrict of Basel (TEB)
- Member of the University Council of the Baden-Wuerttemberg Cooperative State University Loerrach
- Member of the board of directors of the municipal data processing authority Komm.ONE
- Honorary judge of the Loerrach Industrial Tribunal (Arbeitsgericht Lörrach)
- Member of the "Medium Cities" committee of the German Association of Cities
- President of Loerrach International e. V.
- Chairman of the student research center phaenovum e.V.
- President of the Lörrach Town Music Association (Stadtmusik Loerrach)

== Awards ==
- 2009: Theodor-Heuss-Medaille
