= Elmex =

Brand of toothpaste

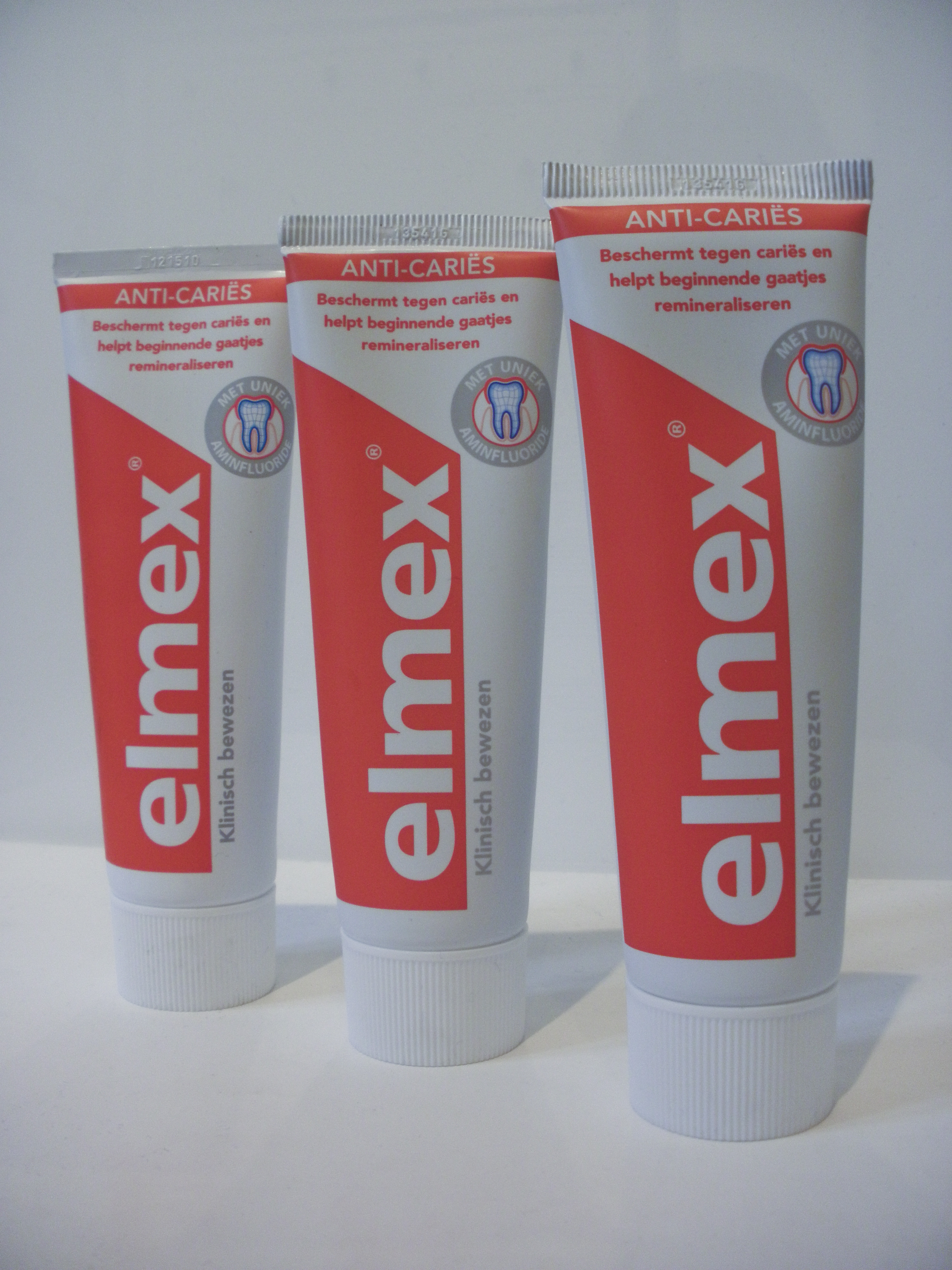
Elmex

Elmex is a brand of toothpaste that has been sold since 1962. It is manufactured by GABA International AG, a Swiss manufacturer of branded oral care products located in Therwil. GABA was acquired by the Colgate-Palmolive company of the United States in 2004 for US$841 million. Elmex was the first toothpaste to contain the organic Amine Fluoride (AmF) olaflur as an active ingredient for protection against dental caries. However, since 2025 Elmex toothpastes no longer contain the key ingredient Olaflur. It has been replaced with the common Sodium Fluoride which is available in most budget toothpastes. Elmex is often sold together with Aronal which should be used in the morning. Aronal contains vitamin A and zinc to protect the gums against inflammation.

The brand had a 25% market share in the German market as of 2008 and is noted for having used the same packaging appearance since its 1962 introduction.

Elmex was the sponsor of the Dutch basketball club "Elmex Leiden" from 1982 to 1985 (now ZZ Leiden)

== See also ==
- List of toothpaste brands
- Index of oral health and dental articles
