= Egon Hugenschmidt =

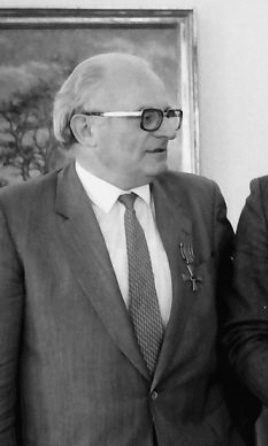
Egon Hugenschmidt (1980)

Egon Hugenschmidt (24 June 1925; Lörrach-Stetten - 11 April 2010) was a German jurist and mayor of Lörrach, Baden-Württemberg (1960–1984). He was a prisoner of war, created the twintown relation of Lörrach with Sens and was awarded with the Federal Cross of Merit.

== Literature ==
- Gerhard Moehring: Vögte und Bürgermeister von Lörrach. in: Walter Jung, Gerhard Moehring (Hrsg.): Unser Lörrach 1975. Eine Grenzstadt im Spiegel der Zeit, Lörrach-Tumringen: Kropf & Herz 1975, Seite 35.
