= Village-Neuf =

Commune in Grand Est, France

Village-Neuf Neidorf
- Commune
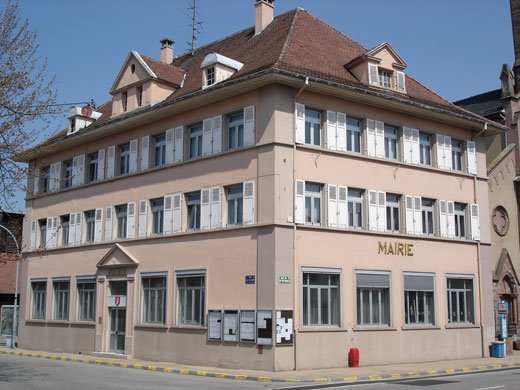
- The town hall in Village-Neuf

- Coat of arms
- Location of Village-Neuf
- Location within France Location within Grand Est
- Coordinates: 47°36′26″N 7°34′13″E
- Country: France
- Region: Grand Est
- Department: Haut-Rhin
- Arrondissement: Mulhouse
- Canton: Saint-Louis
- Intercommunality: Saint-Louis Agglomération

Government
  - Mayor (2020–2026): Isabelle Trendel
- Area^{1}: 6.83 km^{2} (2.64 sq mi)
- Elevation: 245 m (804 ft)
- Highest elevation: 250 m (820 ft)
- Lowest elevation: 232 m (761 ft)
- Population (2023): 4,709
  - Density: 689/km^{2} (1,790/sq mi)
- Time zone: UTC+01:00 (CET)
  - Summer (DST): UTC+02:00 (CEST)
- INSEE/Postal code: 68349 /68128
- ^{1} French Land Register data, which excludes lakes, ponds, glaciers > 1 km^{2} (0.386 sq mi or 247 acres) and river estuaries.

Village-Neuf (French pronunciation: [vilaʒ nœf]; German: Neudorf; Alsatian: Neidorf; literally New Village) is a commune in the Haut-Rhin department in Alsace in north-eastern France.

== Climate ==
Village-Neuf features a continentalized oceanic climate (Cfb) under the Köppen climate classification due to its far inland position within France. Winters are moderately cold and quite dry with sporadic snowfall and summers are hot, humid and stormy.

Climate data for Village-Neuf, elevation: 244 m (801 ft), 1991-2020 estimated averages
Month	Jan	Feb	Mar	Apr	May	Jun	Jul	Aug	Sep	Oct	Nov	Dec	Year
Record high °C (°F)	19.7 (67.5)	22.0 (71.6)	26.7 (80.1)	30.4 (86.7)	33.9 (93.0)	36.0 (96.8)	39.0 (102.2)	39.3 (102.7)	34.1 (93.4)	30.1 (86.2)	24.5 (76.1)	20.5 (68.9)	39.3 (102.7)
Mean daily maximum °C (°F)	5.7 (42.3)	7.8 (46.0)	12.5 (54.5)	16.7 (62.1)	21.2 (70.2)	24.4 (75.9)	26.9 (80.4)	26.6 (79.9)	22.1 (71.8)	16.5 (61.7)	9.8 (49.6)	6.0 (42.8)	16.4 (61.4)
Daily mean °C (°F)	2.7 (36.9)	3.7 (38.7)	7.4 (45.3)	11.3 (52.3)	15.5 (59.9)	19.1 (66.4)	21.2 (70.2)	20.9 (69.6)	16.8 (62.2)	12.0 (53.6)	6.5 (43.7)	3.1 (37.6)	11.7 (53.0)
Mean daily minimum °C (°F)	−0.4 (31.3)	−0.4 (31.3)	2.3 (36.1)	5.8 (42.4)	9.7 (49.5)	13.7 (56.7)	15.5 (59.9)	15.2 (59.4)	11.4 (52.5)	7.4 (45.3)	3.1 (37.6)	0.2 (32.4)	7.0 (44.5)
Record low °C (°F)	−18.0 (−0.4)	−17.2 (1.0)	−10.4 (13.3)	−4.8 (23.4)	−0.2 (31.6)	2.7 (36.9)	7.1 (44.8)	7.0 (44.6)	1.7 (35.1)	−3.0 (26.6)	−10.1 (13.8)	−16.4 (2.5)	−18.0 (−0.4)
Average precipitation mm (inches)	45 (1.8)	42 (1.7)	48 (1.9)	62 (2.4)	95 (3.7)	86 (3.4)	80 (3.1)	90 (3.5)	78 (3.1)	73 (2.9)	55 (2.2)	66 (2.6)	820 (32.3)
Source: SM-DC

== Population ==
Historical population
Year	Pop.	±% p.a.
1968	2,729	—
1975	2,811	+0.42%
1982	2,922	+0.55%
1990	2,920	−0.01%
1999	3,108	+0.70%
2007	3,529	+1.60%
2012	3,853	+1.77%
2017	4,284	+2.14%
2023	4,709	+1.59%
Source: INSEE

== See also ==
- Communes of the Haut-Rhin department
