= 1987 in art =

Events from the year 1987 in art.

== Events ==
- 10 December – Musée d'art moderne (Saint-Étienne) opens as a separate institution.
- 22 July – Palestinian cartoonist Naji al-Ali is shot in London; he dies 28 August.

== Exhibitions ==
- November 20 until January 24, 1988 - Ana Mendieta: A Retrospective at the New Museum in New York City.

== Awards ==
- Archibald Prize – William Robinson, Equestrian self-portrait
- John Moores Painting Prize - Tim Head for "Cow mutations"
- Turner Prize – Richard Deacon

Shortlisted were: Patrick Caulfield, Helen Chadwick, Richard Long, Declan McGonagle and Thérèse Oulton.

== Works ==
- Alice Aycock – Three-Fold Manifestation II (sculpture)
- Wayne Chabre – John von Neumann (gargoyle, Eugene, Oregon)
- Martin Creed – Work No. 1
- Jim Gray – Statue of Dolly Parton (bronze sculpture, Sevierville, Tennessee)
- Rose Finn-Kelcey – Bureau de Change (installation)
- Anselm Kiefer – Osiris and Isis
- Ulrich Rückriem – Untitled (granite sculpture, Art Institute of Chicago)
- Richard Serra – Fulcrum (Cor-Ten steel sculpture, Broadgate, City of London)
- Andres Serrano – Piss Christ (photograph)
- Frank Stella – Decanter (sculpture, Houston, Texas)
- Werner Tübke – Early Bourgeois Revolution in Germany
- Ernest Zobole – House Interior in Landscape

== Births ==
- 1 August – CJ de Silva, Filipino art director, painter, graphic designer and illustrator
- Xyza Cruz Bacani, Filipina street photographer
- Ibrahim Mahama, Ghanaian installation artist

== Deaths ==
=== January to June ===
- 14 February – Else Halling, Norwegian tapestry weaver (b. 1899)
- 18 February – William Coldstream, English realist painter (b. 1908)
- 22 February – Andy Warhol, American artist, director and writer (b. 1928)
- 26 March – Georg Muche, German painter (b. 1895)
- 19 April – Milt Kahl, American animator (b. 1909)
- 8 June - Alexander Iolas, Egyptian born Greek gallerist and collector (b. 1908)

=== July to December ===
- 30 July – Michel Tapié, French artist, critic, curator and art collector (b. 1909)
- 29 August – Naji al-Ali, Palestinian cartoonist (b. c.1938)
- September – Alice Rahon, French-born Mexican painter and poet (b. 1904).
- 25 September – Harry Holtzman, American artist (b. 1912).
- 4 October – Kalervo Palsa, Finnish artist (b. 1947).
- 27 October – Jean Hélion, French painter (b. 1904)
- 28 October – André Masson, French graphic artist (b. 1896)
- 4 November – Raphael Soyer Russian-born American painter, (b. 1899).
- 15 November – Ernő Goldfinger, Hungarian-born architect and furniture designer (b. 1902).
- 2 December – Robert Filliou, French Fluxus artist (b. 1926)
- 18 December - Dimitrije Bašičević, Serbian painter and sculptor (b. 1921)

=== Full date unknown ===
- Roland Ansieau, French Art Deco graphic artist (b. 1901).
- Huang Yao, Chinese artist (b. 1917)
- Raymond Moore, English landscape photographer (b. 1920).
- Myron Stout, American abstract painter (b. 1908).

== See also ==
- 1987 in fine arts of the Soviet Union
