= History of Lörrach =

Town in Baden-Württemberg, Germany

Timeline

1102	First mention of Lörrach as Lorach in a document of the St. Alban Monastery
1403	On January 26, 1403, King Rupert of the Palatinate granted Lörrach market rights
1452	Confirmation of market rights by Emperor Frederick III
1678	French troops destroy Rötteln Castle
1682	Margrave Frederick Magnus of Baden-Durlach grants Lörrach city rights on November 18, 1682
1756	Renewal of city rights and occupation of the first town hall on Wallbrunnstraße
1848	Gustav Struve proclaims the German Republic in Lörrach on September 21, 1848
1908	Incorporation of Stetten
1975	Incorporation of Brombach and Hauingen

The history of Lörrach begins with its first documented mention in 1102 as a settlement. Archaeological discoveries, however, confirm human presence in the area as early as the Paleolithic period. Lörrach received market rights in 1403 and was granted city status in 1682 by Frederick VII, Margrave of Baden-Durlach, making its urban history relatively young compared to its constituent districts and neighboring settlements. Its proximity to the dominant city of Basel hindered its development, and Lörrach retained a largely rural character until its second city elevation in 1756, when its city rights were renewed after being forgotten due to various conflicts. Historical records rarely mentioned Lörrach until the Late Middle Ages, so its development often paralleled that of Basel.

Coat of arms of the city of Lörrach

In the 19th century, Lörrach played a significant role during the German revolution of 1848–49, particularly during the Second Baden Revolution, when Gustav Struve proclaimed the German Republic in September 1848. The city's growth during the Industrialization was driven by its location along the Wiese River and its strategic position on a key north-south trade route across the Alps. The textile industry brought Lörrach recognition far beyond the region. The town's history is also marked by shifting affiliations with various noble families and territories. Parts of modern Lörrach belonged to Further Austria and later to the Grand Duchy of Baden; since 1952, it has been part of Baden-Württemberg.

== Early settlement and roman period ==
=== Prehistory ===
The earliest evidence of human settlement in the Lörrach region consists of stone tools found in Wyhlen on the Upper Rhine, dated to the Paleolithic due to loess deposits above them. Finds in the caves of the Isteiner Klotz from the Mesolithic period (ending around 4500 BC) indicate mining activities and reindeer hunters. Archaeological evidence from the Neolithic period, when village-like settlements emerged during the transition to sedentism, includes stone tools found in the Homburger Wald, the Moosmatte in present-day Stetten, and the Dalcher Boden in Tüllingen, suggesting residential sites. From the Iron Age (the Hallstatt period, roughly 800 to 400 BC), numerous fortified hilltop settlements and burial mounds have been preserved at the Grenzacher Horn, Schädelberg, Hünerberg, and in the Homburger Wald.

In the 1st century BC, the Celtic Helvetii tribe settled in the valleys of the Rhine's tributaries. Many geographical names for mountains, rivers, and places originate from the Celtic language, such as the Rhine, derived from the Celtic Rhennos, meaning "the flowing one." Traces of Celtic settlers are also found in Herten, Wyhlen, and Inzlingen. Near the Kreuzeiche east of Lörrach, a Celtic Viereckschanze from the La Tène period, likely used for cultic purposes, has been identified.

=== Roman period ===
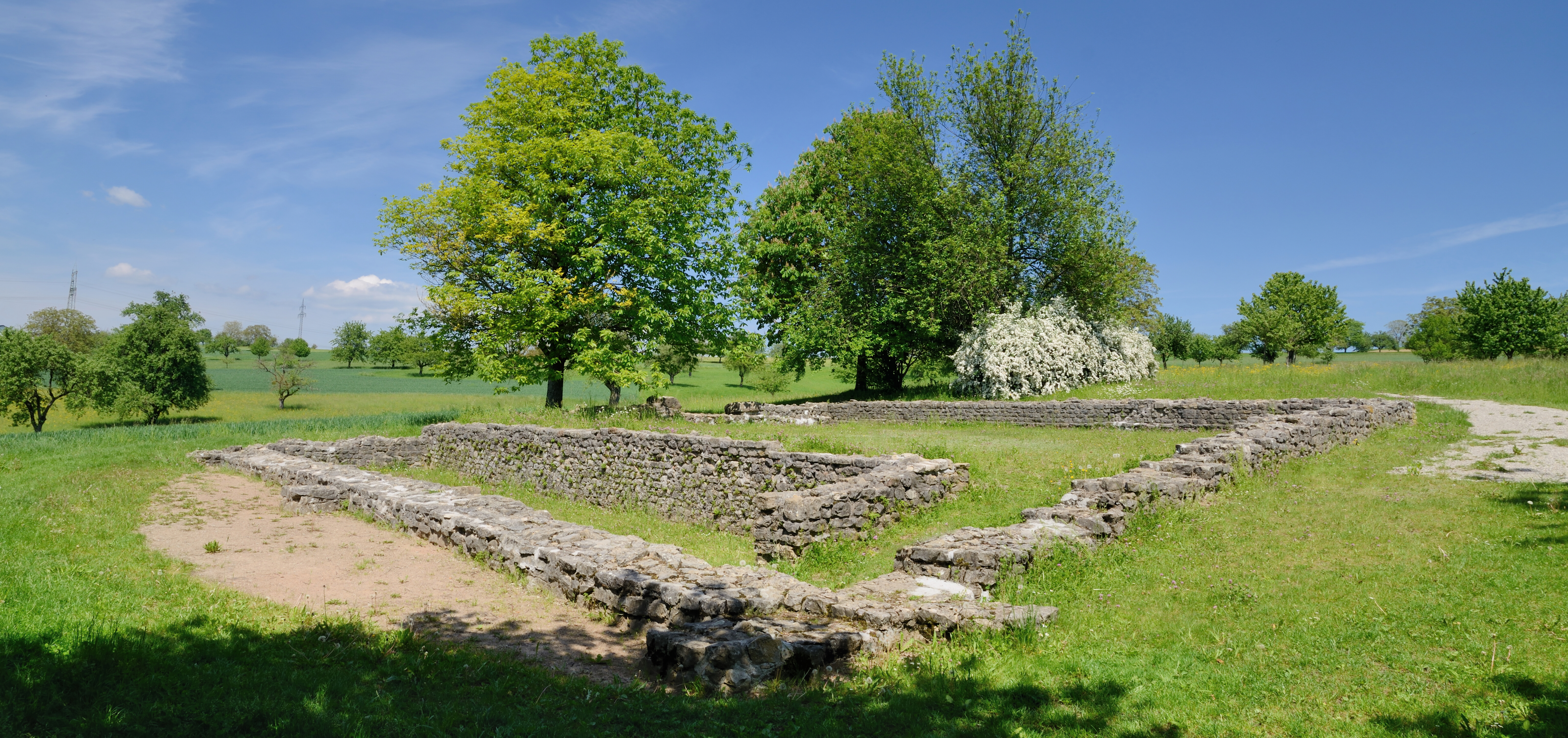
Foundations of the Roman villa rustica in Brombach

For several centuries, the region between the Rhine and the Limes was part of the Roman Empire. Under Emperor Augustus, expansion began with the occupation of the left bank of the Rhine. Around 50 AD, under Emperor Claudius, Romanization extended to the right bank of the Upper and High Rhine up to the Limes, marking the end of Celtic independence and the La Tène culture. The southwestern German Roman territory was known as the Agri Decumates. Notably, unlike the Basel area, the southern Upper Rhine, and the High Rhine valley, evidence of Roman presence in Lörrach is scarce. The lower Wiesental and the Dinkelberg were of little interest to Roman conquerors. Roman traces are found only in present-day Stetten and Brombach. The Roman Empire focused on developing and securing the front line (Danube–Kaiserstuhl) with military camps in the hinterland. Centers of Roman culture south of the Rhine included Vindonissa (Windisch near Brugg), Basilea (Basel), and Augusta Raurica (Augst). Founded around 40 BC, Augusta Rauracorum had two bridges over the Rhine. Around 100 AD, Emperor Trajan built a road from Augst through Haltingen and Efringen-Kirchen to Heidelberg and Mogontiacum (Mainz). However, the most significant Roman roads ran on the left bank of the Rhine. By 300 AD, the Rhine and Lake Constance formed a boundary between Romans and Alamanni, with frequent conflicts between the two groups.

== From the first mention to the Late Middle Ages ==
=== Early Middle Ages ===
Most villages in southwestern Germany with suffixes like -ingen, -heim, -ach, -bach, -weil, and -stetten emerged in the 6th and 7th centuries. A second wave of settlement reached the upper Wiesental as far as Todtnau. Around 500 AD, the Alamanni came under Frankish rule. In 746, all Alamanni leaders were executed on the orders of Pippin the Younger and Charles Martel in the Blood Court of Cannstatt. Evidence of settlement in the Merovingian period abounds in the Lörrach area. The districts of Tumringen, Tüllingen, and Hauingen reflect early foundations through their names. Stetten, formerly Stetiheim, indicates expansion in the 7th century. Around 600, Saint Fridolin proclaimed Christianity. The town of Zell im Wiesental was then a cella of the Fridolin monks. Stetten, founded by the Säckingen Monastery, was first documented in 763, and its church was dedicated to Saint Fridolin in honor of the monks. As a fief under Habsburg protection, Stetten was assigned to Further Austria and remained Catholic after the Reformation. A document from September 7, 751, records the donation by Ebo and his wife Odalsinda to the Abbey of St. Gallen, mentioning a church in Rötteln (ecclesia Raudinleim). The document's author was a priest named Landarius from the Rötteln church. From St. Blasien, priories were established (1100 in Weitenau, 1126 in Bürgeln and Sulzburg) and a nunnery in Sitzenkirch. The extensive expansion of its holdings gave the St. Blasien Abbey political and intellectual influence, making it renowned beyond the region. In the 12th and 13th centuries, the village of Lörrach gained significance.

=== First mention of Lörrach to the end of the Lords of Rötteln ===
The first written mention of Lörrach dates to 1102, commemorated during anniversary celebrations. The foundation document of the St. Alban Monastery states that Bishop Burkhard appointed Baron Dietrich of Rötteln as the protector of the right-bank possessions. The document reads:

Lorach cum ecclesia omnibusque suis appenditiis [...], meaning: Lörrach with its church and all its appurtenances, such as fields, meadows, and vineyards.

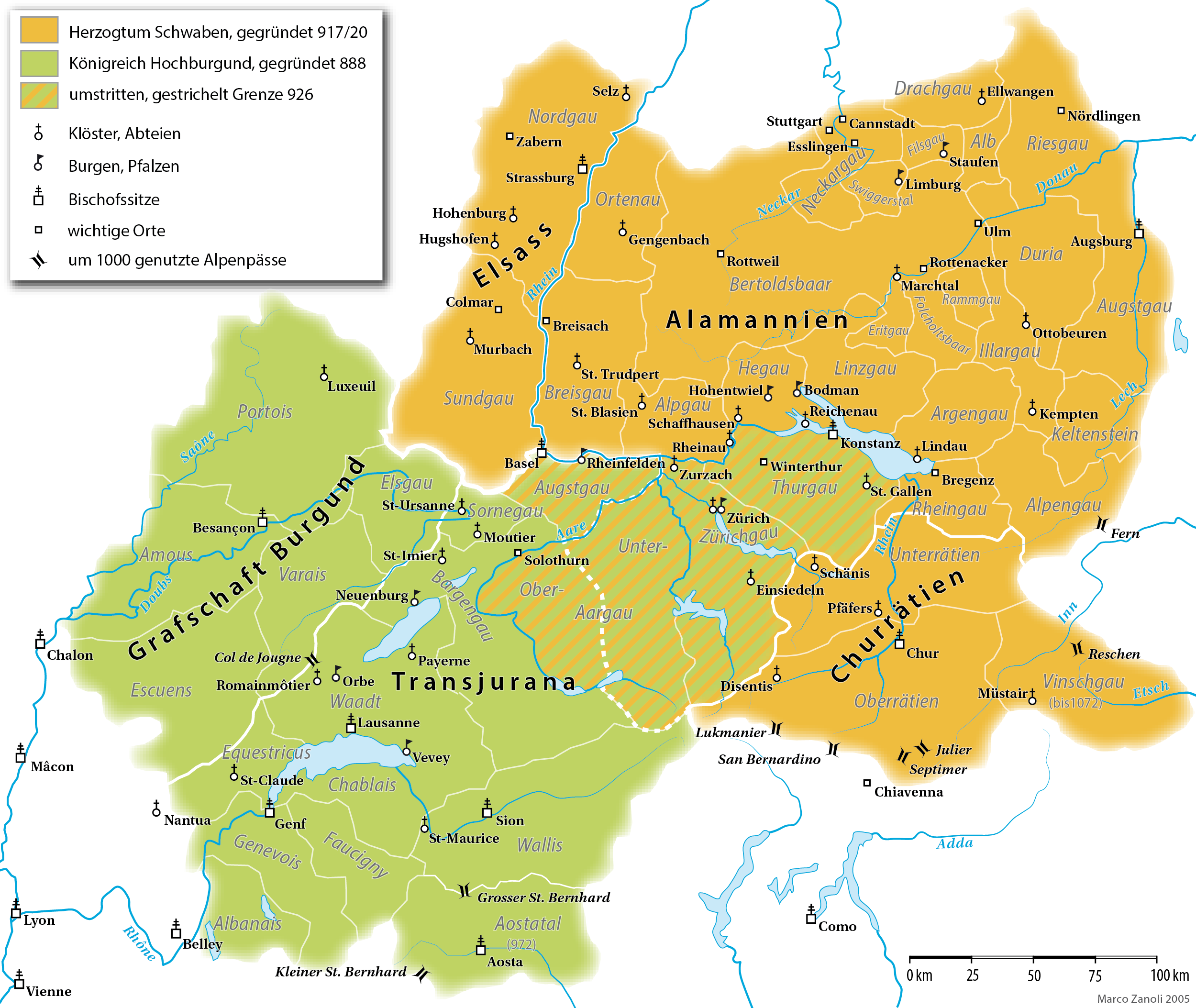
Map of Alamannia and Upper Burgundy around the year 1000

The list also includes churches in Hauingen, Biesheim, and the Martinskirche in Basel. It remains unclear why Lörrach's mention came so late, as neighboring settlements appear in Carolingian documents of the Lorsch and St. Gallen monasteries much earlier. The most plausible theory is that the possessions in Kleinbasel and Lörrach were transferred to the Bishop of Basel by Henry IV only in the 11th century, explaining why this ancient, likely pre-medieval-named settlement does not appear in earlier records. Documents are preserved only where donations were made.

The history of the free Lords of Rötteln is closely tied to that of Lörrach. Their exact origins are unknown. They were first mentioned in 1102/1103 when Dietrich of Rötteln was entrusted with the stewardship of the St. Alban Monastery's holdings in Basel. Through inheritance, the Lords of Rötteln acquired significant portions of the Waldeck family's possessions. It is assumed they already owned the Rötteln castle and church. Their holdings provided a strong foundation, granting them significant influence in the Dioceses of Basel and partly Constance. The Lords of Rötteln primarily held ecclesiastical offices, sometimes as canons or bishops. Due to the lack of early donation records, reconstructing Dietrich of Rötteln's possessions, who likely lived until 1123, is challenging

In 1259, Rötteln Castle was first documented under Konrad of Rötteln, who also elevated Schopfheim to city status. The castle likely existed since the 11th century. The Rötteln lineage died out during this period. Lüthold II of Rötteln (died May 19, 1316), who was to become Bishop of Basel, was the last male heir and transferred the Rötteln lordship rights to Margrave Heinrich of Hachberg-Sausenberg, his niece Agnes's son, in 1315. After Heinrich's early death in 1318, brothers Rudolf II and Otto jointly governed the combined lordships of Rötteln and Sausenberg, moving the seat from the small Sausenburg to Rötteln Castle. From then, they were known as Margraves of Hachberg, Lords of Rötteln and Sausenberg or simply Margraves of Rötteln.

=== Late Middle Ages ===
Reconstructions suggest that Lörrach's settlement structure was shaped by its road network. The old Wiesentalstraße, running from Basel via Riehen to Schopfheim, aligns with today's Basler Straße in the city center, continuing with a slight curve past the Lörrach marketplace into Turmstraße. At the marketplace, it meets Wallbrunnstraße at a right angle, leading toward the Dinkelberg. Modern streets largely follow these ancient routes. South of today's Herrenstraße stood a castle complex, named after the Lords of Lörrach. This moated castle, similar to those in Inzlingen, Grenzach, and other places, was located on the eastern edge of the Wiese River and existed since the early 14th century. It was a simple residence with a double wall and a moat, with a pond south of the castle drained after 1595. The village of Lörrach was bounded to the north by today's Teichstraße. The oldest village core was likely at the foot of the Hünerberg in the Ufhabi, along Wallbrunnstraße east of the market, where the livestock market (now Engelplatz) was located. The area in between was not continuously built up. This situation likely persisted throughout the Middle Ages, as few structural expansions occurred during this period.

In the late 14th century, the Lords of Lörrach disappeared from the town. Some remained in Basel as officials, while others took over the Biberstein lordship in the Bernese region. After the Lords of Lörrach, the castle and its lands passed to various owners. On March 28, 1638, the castle burned down, and its remains were cleared in 1720. The former castle site saw the construction of a large manorial granary and cellar, the Hofküferei (now the Dreiländermuseum), and the castle bailiff's building (now the main customs office).

On January 26, 1403, King Rupert of the Palatinate granted Margrave Rudolf III of Hachberg-Sausenberg the right to hold an annual market in Lörrach on the Wednesday before St. Michael's Day (September 29) and a weekly market every Wednesday. Given Lörrach's location at the intersection of major trade routes, these market rights, confirmed by Emperor Frederick III in 1452, were significant.

During this period, neighboring Basel, with which the Margraves of Hachberg-Sausenberg had close ties, also developed. They owned a house on the Rheinsprung. In 1400, Basel became a free imperial city governed by guilds. From 1431 to 1449, the Council of Basel posed logistical challenges, as participants from across the empire and Italy required provisions, leading to food shortages and price increases. A harvest failure in 1437 further strained the economy. At Easter 1439, the plague struck the overcrowded city and council attendees. In August 1444, the troops of the French Dauphin Louis, known as the Armagnacs, approached Basel, engaging the city in battle.

== Early modern period ==
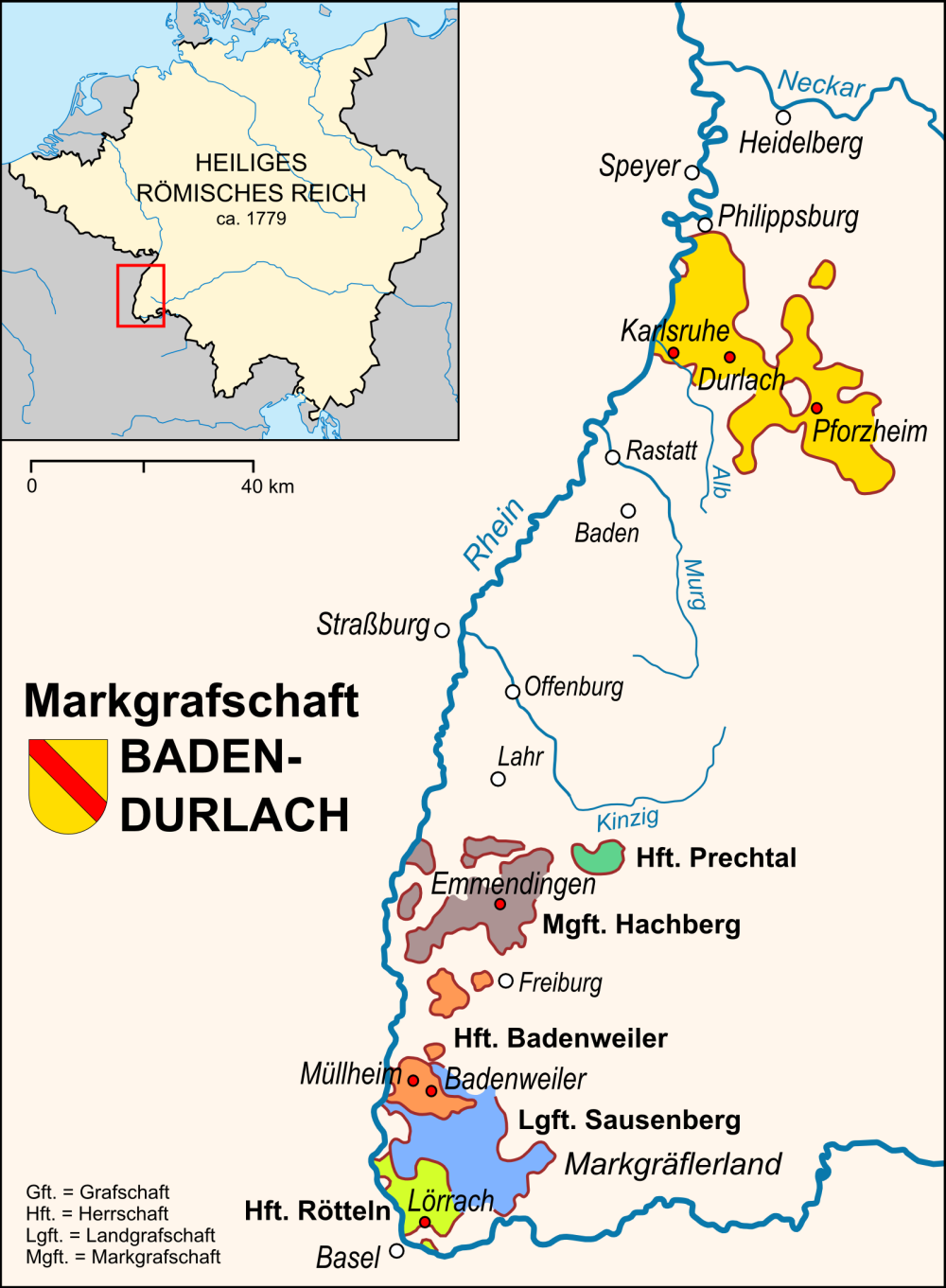
Lörrach in the Margraviate of Baden-Durlach

=== Reformation in the Margraviate ===
Since 1102, the right to appoint the Lörrach parish priest belonged to the St. Alban Monastery in Basel. On April 1, 1529, this right transferred to the Basel magistrate, based on Oekolampad's Reformation ordinance.

=== Thirty Years' War ===
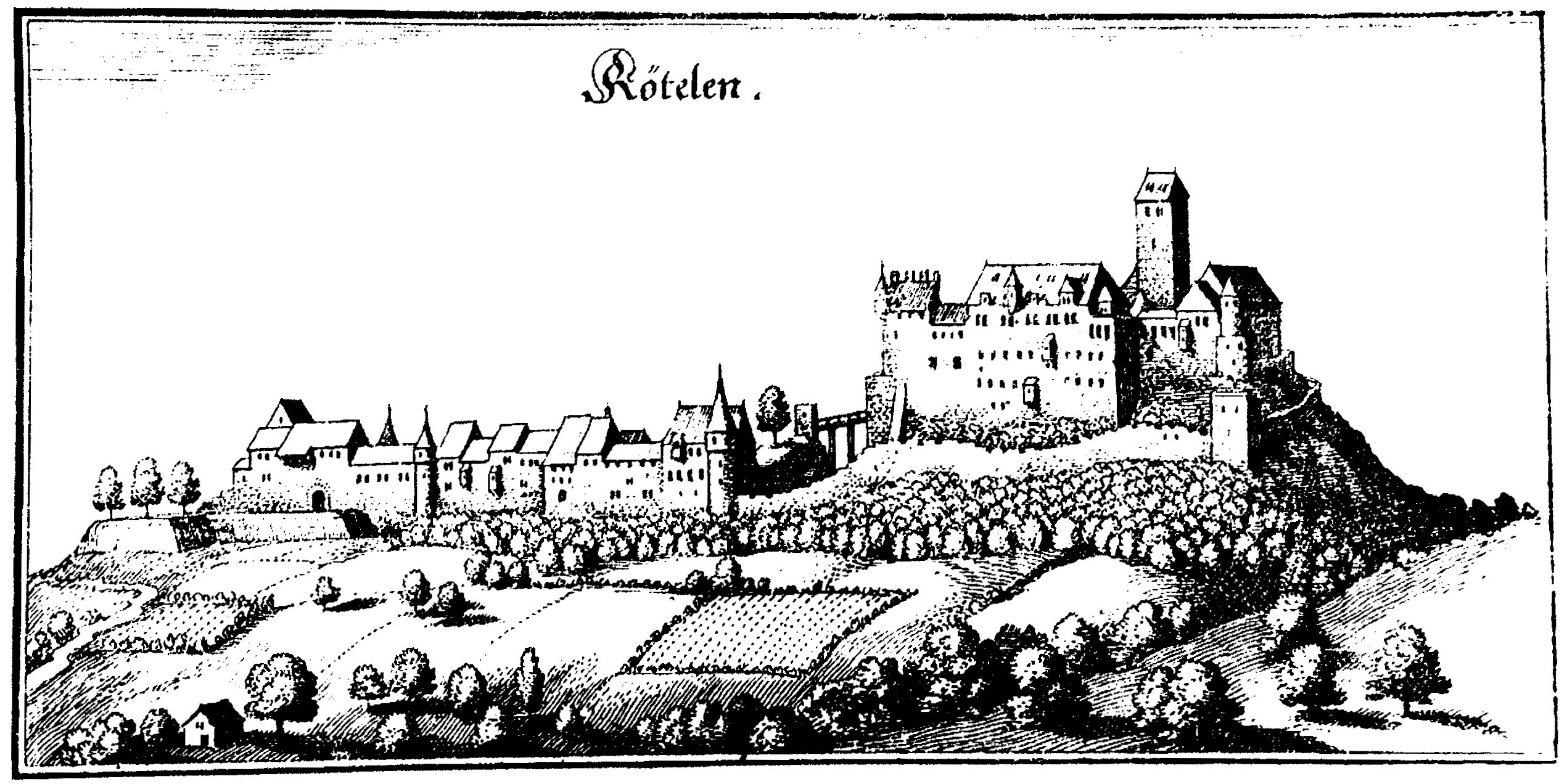
Rötteln Castle in a 1643 depiction

In 1610 and 1629, the plague struck. The population suffered from looting and arson by marauding troops during the long war years, seeking safety and securing their possessions in Basel. From 1633, repeated passages of Spanish and other troops caused severe hardship. In 1638, the Battle of Rheinfelden saw Bernhard of Saxe-Weimar defeat the Imperials. He established his headquarters in Brombach and occupied Rötteln. The Swedes captured Rötteln Castle, while Lörrach's castle was destroyed by fire and not rebuilt. The plague claimed many lives in Lörrach in 1634, reducing the population to just 454 by 1645. The financial damage from 1622 to 1648 was significant, with the Rötteln Oberamt estimating it at 610,290 gulden. During these years, the margrave sought asylum in Basel. To pay contributions to the French military, he was forced to sell Klein-Hüningen to Basel. Plundering left his subjects unable to pay taxes. The Peace of Westphalia in 1648 brought calm to the Margraviate. Switzerland, represented by Basel mayor Rudolf Wettstein, was involved in the negotiations, where the Old Swiss Confederacy formally separated from the Holy Roman Empire. In the late 17th century, the Margraviate and Black Forest's depleted population was replenished by Swiss immigrants.

=== Granting of city rights ===
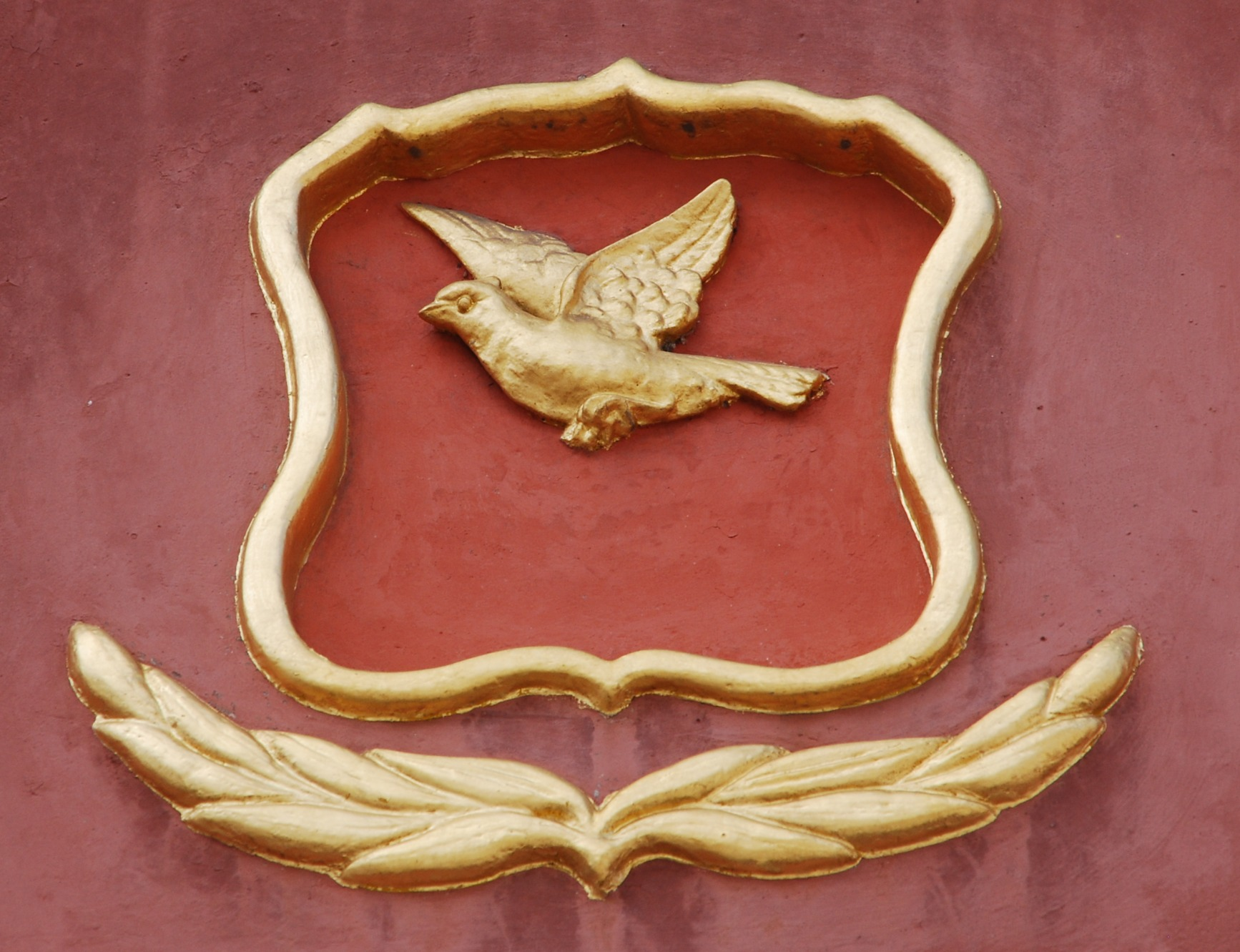
Lörrach’s coat of arms on the facade of the parish house of the city church

The destruction of Rötteln Castle by French troops during the Franco-Dutch War on January 29, 1678, brought Lörrach into focus. Margravial authorities needed new accommodations, which they found partly in Basel and Lörrach. At the suggestion of Landvogt Reinhard von Gemmingen, Margrave Frederick Magnus of Baden-Durlach granted Lörrach city rights on November 18, 1682. The Landvogtei, based on Rheinfelderstraße (now Wallbrunnstraße), became the chief authority. On April 12, 1683, the margrave issued a privilege letter. However, ongoing war unrest rendered these city rights ineffective, and they were forgotten. On March 26, 1755, the Lörrach community requested the margravial government to renew the city privileges. Margrave Karl Friedrich, prompted by Landvogt Gustav Magnus von Wallbrunn, renewed Lörrach's city rights on June 3, 1756. The new city privilege was publicly announced on August 24, 1756. The privilege letter included nine points, such as the right to a "mayor and six judicial and council persons." The margrave also confirmed the city's coat of arms, "which this place has already chosen in the image of a lark," allowing it to "bear a golden lark in a red field."

=== Spanish War of Succession and subsequent years ===
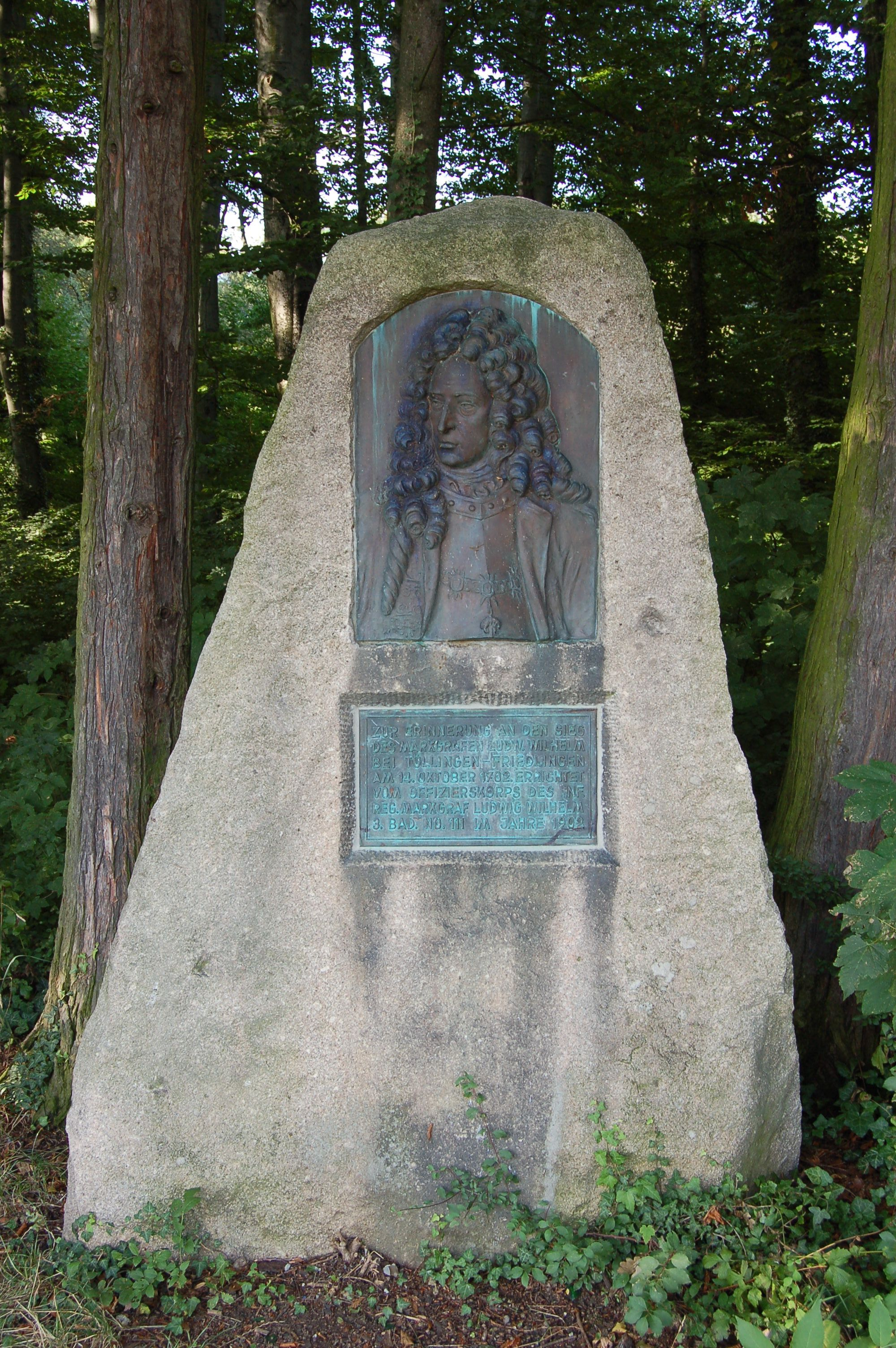
Monument on Tüllinger Hill commemorating the Battle of Käferholz

Even after the Thirty Years' War, Lörrach faced repeated conflicts. Weil and surrounding Margraviate villages were destroyed. The Rötteln bailiwick was liable for war debts. A Stetten record, "War and Military Matters," held in the Lörrach City Archive, lists damages totaling 17,385 gulden and 18 schillings. These included costs for repairing fire damage, food supplies, hay, straw, and wine.

=== Revolutions and coalition wars ===
Baden from 1803 to 1819

For weeks, Alsatian crowds have been pouring into the region, into and around Lörrach. They pay 10 to 12 batzen daily for board. They are said to be aristocrats aiming to overthrow the democratic National Assembly in Paris and restore the king's prestige and power.

— Philipp Jakob Herbst, Pastor in Steinen, February 1791

Pastor Herbst's note summarizes the region's conditions at the time. After the Storming of the Bastille during the French Revolution, the aristocracy fled, first to Alsace and later across the Rhine. Imperial dragoons entered Lörrach in April 1791, fearing a French invasion. After France declared war on Austria, Lörrach faced renewed conflict, as the margrave was allied with Austria and Prussia. In 1793, imperial troops were defeated at Haguenau, burdening Lörrach's population with war costs. After the Peace of Basel in 1795, the Baden uplands were defenseless against French armies. Lörrach's Landvogt and later Baden's first minister, Sigismund von Reitzenstein, was sent to Paris to negotiate a separate peace, securing commitments for Baden's later territorial expansions. From 1792 to 1796, troops were constantly stationed in Lörrach, requiring local provisions. For about nine months, 100 cuirassiers were quartered there, and for two days, Lörrach hosted 16,950 men from four regiments. Daily rations were fixed: officers received six times, colonels twelve times, and generals twenty-four times a soldier's ration.

During the War of the First Coalition in 1796, the Baden Margraviate became a battleground. Under General Jean Victor Moreau, French troops entered via Hüningen and Kehl. Two thousand Lörrach men were conscripted for fortification work. When contributions were not delivered on time, Landschreiber and privy councilor Christian Gottlieb Michael Hugo was imprisoned. Lörrach briefly served as a French headquarters. Moreau advanced through the Wiesental and Höllental to the Danube but was defeated by imperial troops at Ulm and Würzburg in September, returning to the Rhine Valley on October 15. On October 24, 1796, a final clash occurred between Moreau and Austrian Archduke Charles at Emmendingen and Schliengen. Fleeing and plundering French troops reached Lörrach via the Kander and Wiesental. In Tüllingen, 40 to 100 soldiers were quartered per household. The soldiers' heavy wine consumption led many Lörrach taverns to start brewing beer.

During the War of the Second Coalition (1799–1802), the lower Wiesental was again occupied by French troops. In 1801, Lörrach hosted 30,000 infantrymen and 12,000 horses. Infectious diseases further burdened the town. However, Baden benefited significantly. Napoleon elevated it to an electorate in 1803 via the Reichsdeputationshauptschluss and to a grand duchy in 1806, creating a consolidated state more than twice the size of the former margraviate. Military alliances made Baden, and thus Lörrach, an enemy from a German perspective. After France's defeat in the Battle of Leipzig in 1813, Grand Duke Charles renounced Napoleon. During the 1814 French campaign, Lörrach was the headquarters of Field Marshal Karl Philipp zu Schwarzenberg, who spent Christmas 1813 there with nine generals, two colonels, and 3,850 troops. Until mid-1814, Russian Tsar Alexander I, Prussian King Frederick William III, Austrian Emperor Francis I, and Prince Wilhelm of Prussia were quartered at Lörrach's Krone inn. Other generals, colonels, and officers stayed at the Hirschen. In one month, Lörrach provided provisions for 161,646 military personnel. The town, with 3,000 inhabitants, also funded repairs for broken cannon axles, candles for quarters, and stationery for military offices. From November 22, 1813, to June 1, 1816, Lörrach's city accountant recorded 410,917 men and 54,118 horses quartered there.

In the late 18th and early 19th centuries, the prominent Alemannic dialect poet Johann Peter Hebel was active in Lörrach. Although his birthplace is listed as Basel, he was reportedly born unexpectedly on May 10, 1760, at the Bad inn in Hauingen during a parental visit to Pastor Nutzinger.

== Modern times ==
=== Baden Revolution ===
Industrial expansion necessitated worker housing, rapidly altering Lörrach's cityscape. Philanthropic initiatives, such as the Spitalstiftung and Hebelpark, emerged. Around 1808, classical architecture flourished, with constructions like the synagogue, city church, and Fridolinskirche in Stetten. Baden's 1806 organizational edicts unified municipal laws, appointing mayors by state authority. City councils, doubling as courts, shared governance with mayors. Lörrach, a prosperous community, was granted its own council clerk. Councils were co-opted, a practice deemed outdated. The 1821 provisional and 1831 Baden municipal ordinances reformed governance, designating Lörrach a citizen municipality where non-citizens were excluded from participation. Full resident equality was achieved in 1890. Community assemblies elected mayors and citizen committees, forming councils. The 1831 ordinance ensured equal voting rights, but the 1848/49 Baden Revolution prompted Baden to adopt a three-class voting system based on tax contributions.

==== First Baden Revolution ====
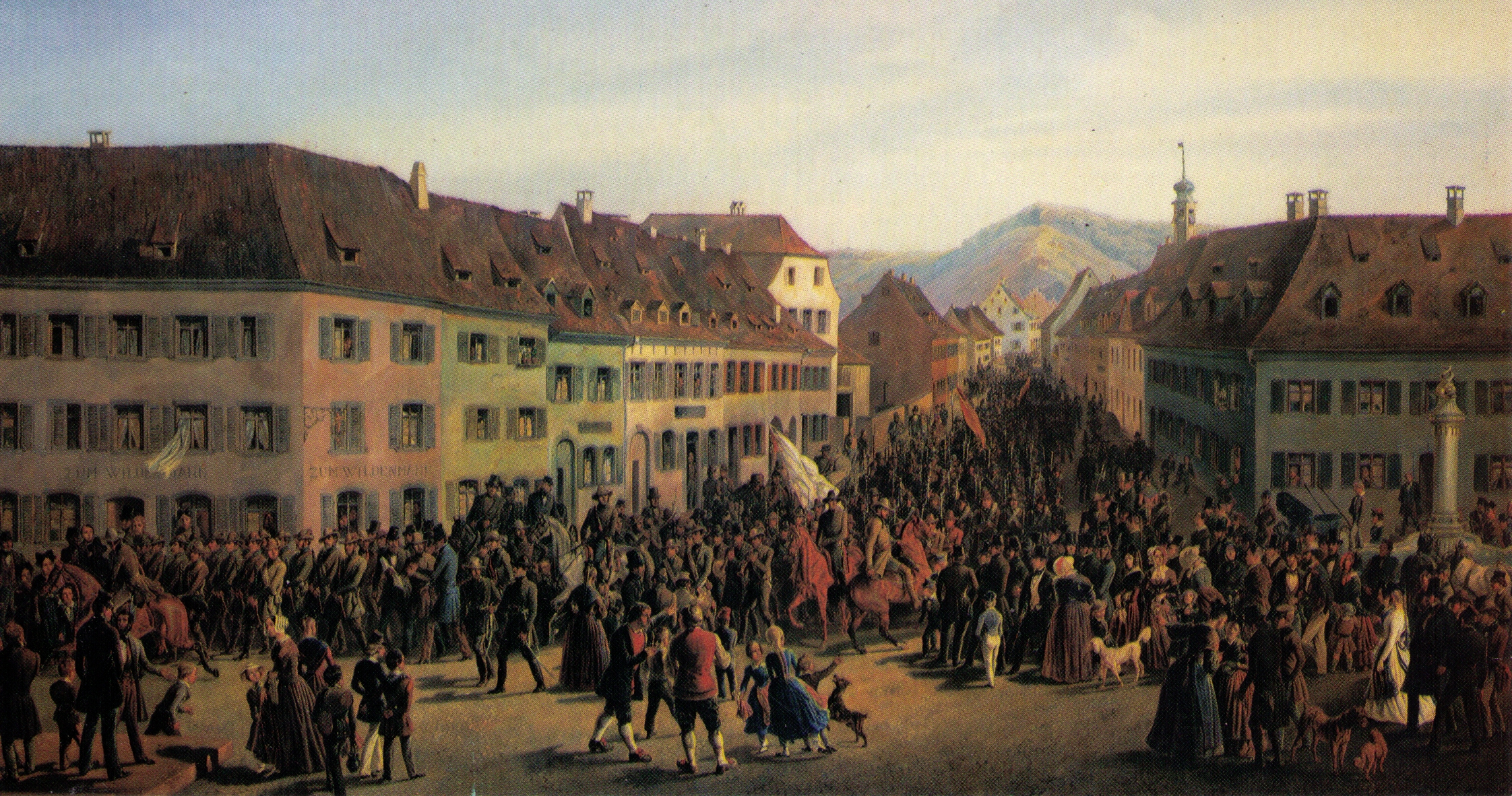
Entry of a Freischärler column under Gustav Struve in Lörrach on April 20, 1848, en route to support Hecker's campaign at Kandern (oil painting by Friedrich Kaiser)

Following the 1832 Hambach Festival, Lörrach voiced liberal demands. Assemblies and uprisings, such as those in Offenburg (September 1847), Mannheim (February 1848), and Konstanz (April 1848), called for press, conscience, academic, and personal freedoms. Baden's 1818 constitution, progressive for the German Confederation, lacked provisions for popular sovereignty, fundamental rights, and independent judiciary. In Konstanz, Friedrich Hecker and Gustav Struve declared a republic. The next day, a small group marched along the Rhine plain toward Karlsruhe, aiming for Schliengen, the Mannheim-Basel railway's terminus. On April 20, 1848, Hecker urged Lörrach to join the revolution. The council refused; of 276 eligible voters, 198 attended, and 142 voted against participation.

=== Second Baden Revolution ===
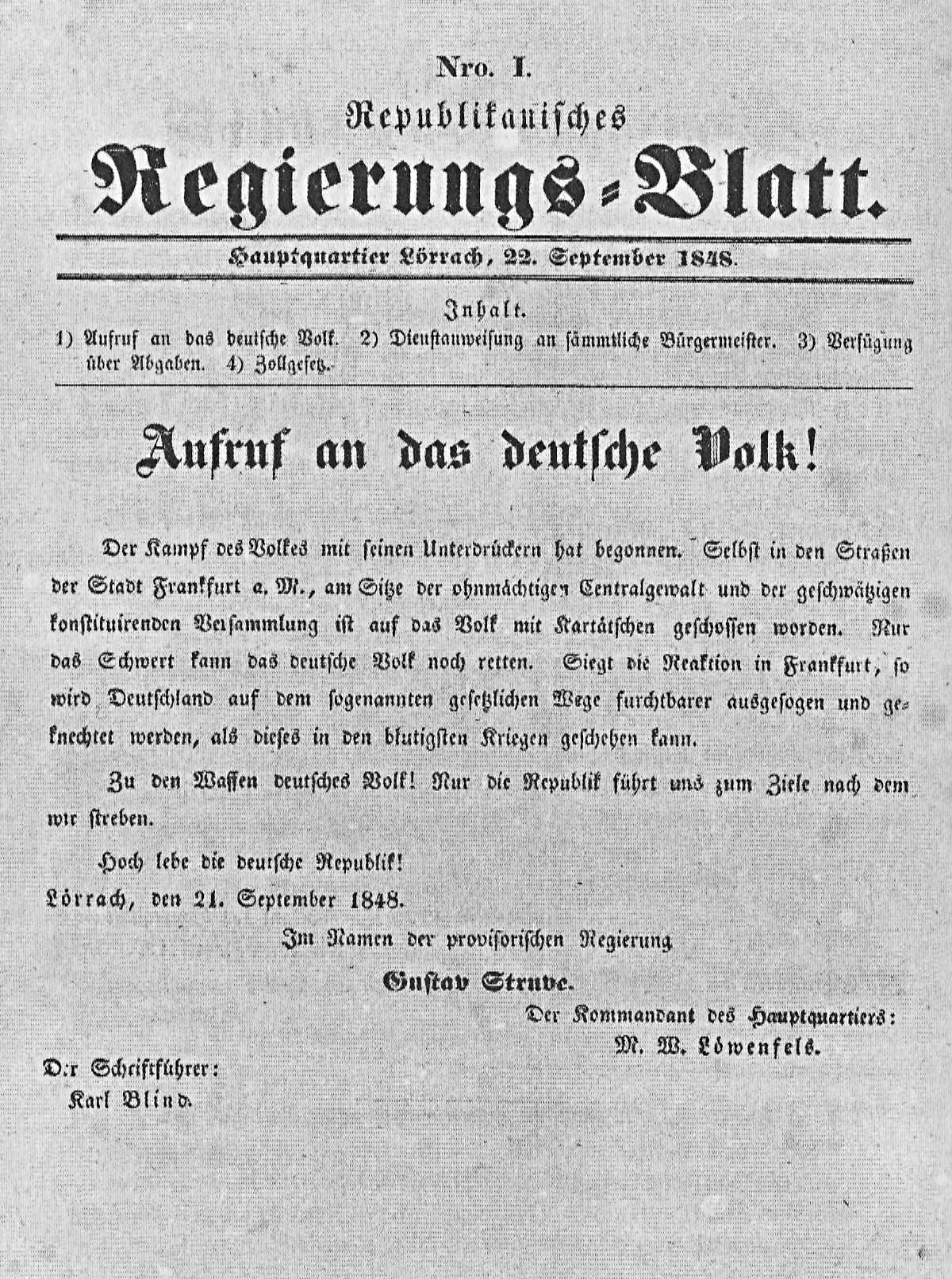
Republican Government Gazette No. 1 in the name of Gustav Struve’s “provisional government”

Struve, having fled to Basel, launched the Struve Putsch on September 21, 1848, from Stetten. By 5:30 p.m., with Stetten's militia, he marched to Lörrach's town hall on Wallbrunnstraße. A red flag was raised on the market fountain, and red-painted boards inscribed with "German Republic" in black and gold were affixed to the administrative and post offices. Lörrach's militia, led by Captain Markus Pflüger, rallied to support Struve. Grand-ducal officials were arrested, and Mayor Carl Georg Wenner and the council were summoned. From the town hall's first floor, Struve proclaimed the republic, declared martial law, promised tax abolition, and pledged social reforms. Revolutionary flyers, including a call to the German people, mayoral instructions, and news from Lörrach's headquarters, were printed at the seized Gutsch press and distributed. Men aged 18–40 were conscripted for Struve's Karlsruhe march. Lörrach served as the putsch's "capital" for four days. Local physician and politician Dr. Eduard Kaiser described it as "half highway robbery, half farce." On September 24, Struve's 1,000-man force was defeated at Staufen by General Friedrich Hoffmann's government troops. Struve was captured in Wehr and taken to Rastatt. A larger troop contingent under Colonel Rotberg was quartered in Lörrach, ending the second revolutionary attempt. Historian Hubert Bernnat attributes the failure to Struve's lack of support from underprivileged groups and his blend of utopian socialism with reckless radicalism.

==== Third Baden Revolution and Railway Opening ====
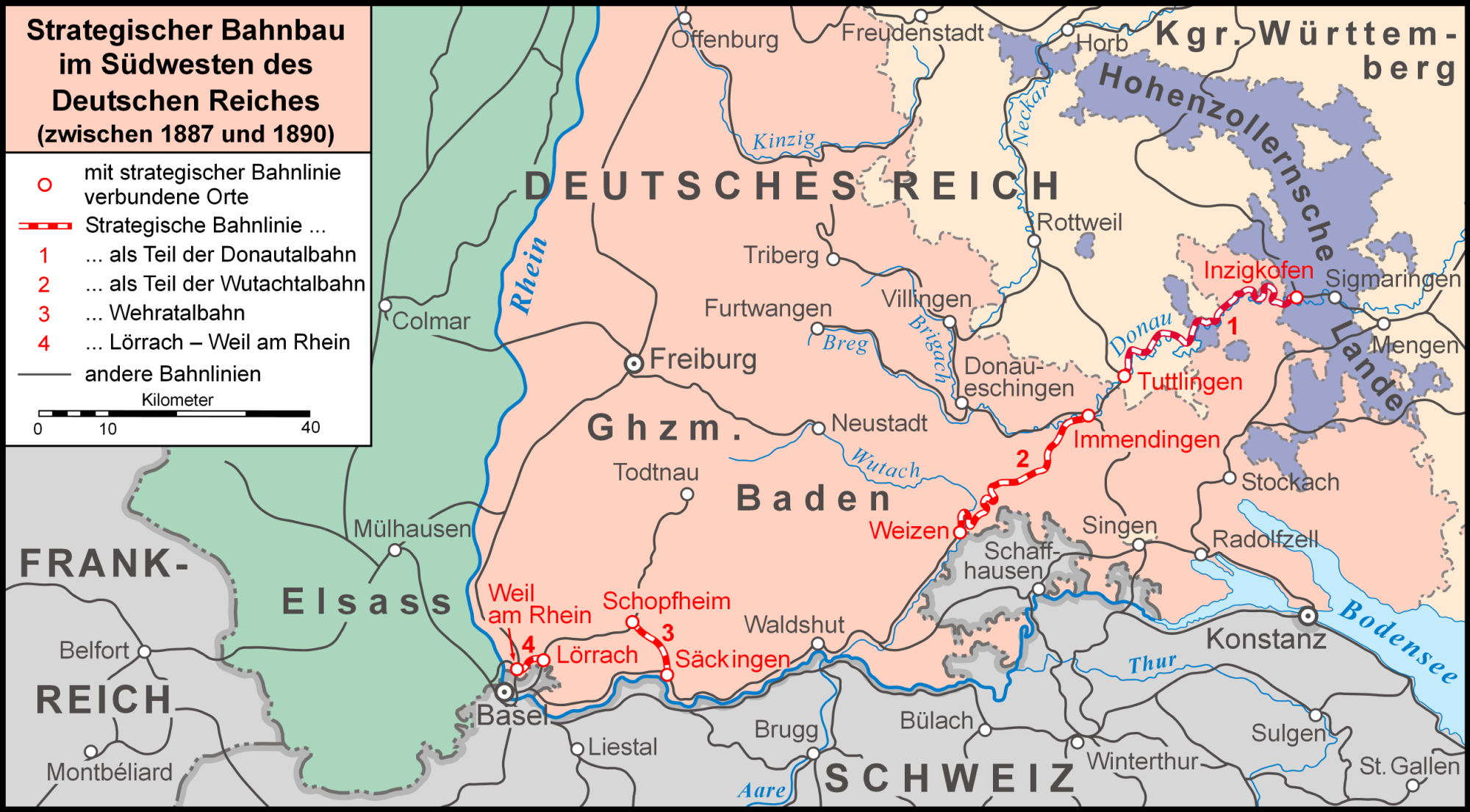
Strategic railway construction in South Baden

In 1849, the Baden Main Line was completed near the Swiss border, and in 1862, the railway from Basel to Lörrach and Schopfheim was opened in the presence of Grand Duke Friedrich. With the completion of the Hydroelectric Power Plant in Rheinfelden in 1899, the Wiese Valley Railway became Baden's first electrified railway in 1913, among Germany's earliest. It was also the first private railway in the Grand Duchy of Baden. In 1867, the Catholic St. Bonifatius Church was built. By then, Lörrach had about 6,000 residents. The Franco-Prussian War of 1870–71 largely spared Lörrach, though it was the site of a successful deception maneuver (Deception at Käferholz) staged at Tüllinger Höhe. Municipal meetings were held in the Stubenwirtshaus until the mid-18th century. In 1756, the town hall on Wallbrunnstraße was built and renovated in 1869–70. Since 1927, the town hall operated from the converted Villa Favre at the station.

=== First World War and Hyperinflation ===
The economic boom ended with the outbreak of World War I on August 1, 1914. The Burghof, used as a barracks square, saw conscription, clothing, and arming of eligible men, including those abroad. After the French army's advance to Mulhouse, Lörrach experienced unrest. Fighting shifted north, turning the Vosges front into trench warfare. Mayor Gugelmeier negotiated with Basel's government to shelter Lörrach's women and children in neutral Basel during potential attacks. In 1915, Lörrach suffered casualties from enemy air raids. The Tüllinger Berg saw the construction of a Hindenburg Line for city defense, and in 1916, a secondary school was converted into a hospital. Lörrach and surrounding areas lost 813 men during the war.

Post-war, Lörrach's situation did not improve. Raw material shortages had plunged the textile industry into crisis by 1913. By late 1914, the city had about 1,000 unemployed. War-induced structural changes threatened Lörrach's economy. Centralized control from Berlin and limited allocation quotas risked factory closures. The Swiss and French labor markets provided some relief. The November Revolution of 1918 spurred political radicalization toward the left, more pronounced in Lörrach than other Baden cities. An assassination attempt on Mayor Gugelmeier occurred on March 4, 1919.

Social conditions worsened, and currency devaluation began in August 1922. In January 1923, French and Belgian troops occupied the Ruhr for alleged reparations arrears (Ruhr Occupation). A month later, French troops entered Baden, occupying Appenweier, disrupting the Rhine Valley railway between Karlsruhe and Basel. The Reich government's passive resistance declaration on January 13 accelerated hyperinflation. In the last week of August 1923, a construction worker in Weil am Rhein-Leopoldshöhe earned 985,000 Marks per hour. A kilogram of rye bread cost 414,000 Marks, and pork cost 4,400,000 Marks. A peculiar notice in the Oberbadisches Volksblatt on September 7, 1923, read: "The man who last Tuesday received a 10-dollar check cashed for just over 3 million Marks at the local Reichsbank is requested to report, as he should have received about 170 million Marks." Inflation escalated further; by late October, a tram ride from the station to the border cost 290 million Marks, and the city granted the consumer cooperative a 10 trillion Mark loan for potatoes. Municipalities printed emergency money, and goods were often only available for barter or foreign currency. Falling wages and rising food prices caused malnutrition and poverty. Unrest began in early September in Rheinfelden, Freiburg on September 12, and Lörrach on September 14. Unemployment rose from 200 to 1,600 by year-end 1923.

==== Weimar Republic Era ====
These developments fueled social unrest in Lörrach. Authorities were on high alert as underground tensions simmered. The peak was the September Unrest of 1923 in Lörrach. On September 14, workers mobilized in Lörrach's streets and Wiesental. Security police intervention prevented further escalation. The toll was three deaths, numerous injuries, and several hostage abuses.

Economic instability affected authorities and administration. Funding overdue projects became challenging. Lörrach lacked a new elementary school in Stetten, and a hospital construction was pending. Funds sufficed only for a swimming pool. The essential town hall construction was repeatedly postponed, relying on temporary solutions. Borrowing increased Lörrach's debt between 1923 and 1927. Mayor Dr. Heinrich Graser's tenure (1927–1933) was marked by deficit management. Tight finances delayed infrastructure improvements, like the toll-free road. The 1930/31 budget reflected declining tax revenues and rising welfare costs, making major projects unfeasible. Unemployment held at 450 in November 1929, rising to 517 by September 1930.

Political polarization intensified in autumn 1930, evident in debates and election results. The NSDAP gained traction. In the 1929 Baden state elections, the NSDAP won 115 votes in Lörrach and 65,121 statewide, securing six seats. Lörrach exemplified a mid-sized city with radicalization from both left and right. The municipal beverage tax was approved in September 1930 but blocked by a citizens' committee. The first post-election committee meeting on December 29, 1930, saw chaotic scenes, police intervention, and a narrow vote for the tax, excluding communist councilors. Without it, the budget would have been unbalanced, risking state oversight and temporary loss of self-governance.

==== National Socialist Era ====
The NSDAP local branch in Lörrach, established in 1922, struggled in the Weimar Republic 1920s despite anti-parliamentary propaganda in the German-nationalist magazine Der Markgräfler by dialect poet Hermann Burte. The death of Gustav Stresemann in October 1929 and the New York stock market crash on October 25, 1929 (Black Friday), boosted Nazi influence. In the Reichstag Election 1928, the NSDAP received only 57 votes in Lörrach. However, it gained significant support in Protestant rural areas around Lörrach. By autumn 1930, the NSDAP local branch had only 11 members, hampered by poor organization, debt, and unpaid bills, leading to its dissolution. Reinhard Boos revitalized it, growing membership to 376 by late 1932 from diverse social strata. The 1933 seizure of power made Boos mayor until 1945, also serving as Kreisleiter from 1931 to 1938. The SA gained prominence, clashing with KPD supporters in a documented brawl in June 1931. The Nazi newspaper Der Alemanne became Upper Baden's propaganda organ, published in Freiburg. Repressions targeted KPD members. On May 1, 1933, an Iron Front flag was burned, with Boos claiming universal support for the Nazi movement. The KPD was banned, and in April 1933, ten political prisoners were sent to a concentration camp. Basel's foreign newspapers were banned in Lörrach.

After Germany refused further reparations, the Wehrmacht was established in 1935, occupying the demilitarized zone in 1936 (Rhineland Occupation). Lörrach became a provisional garrison town. At the May 1, 1936, celebration, soldiers and the Hitler Youth conducted public air raid drills at the station. On October 18, 1936, a major Nazi event featured Julius Streicher, Gauleiter of Middle Franconia, attacking the Catholic Church and Archbishop Conrad Gröber. Boos promoted Lörrach as the center of a greater Lörrach region. His goal was to surpass Basel's 160,000 population, proposing the incorporation of Brombach, Haagen, Tumringen, and Tüllingen. The district administrator supported including Weil's 8,000 residents, but resistance limited incorporations to Tumringen and Tüllingen by October 1, 1935.

After the Second World War began, Boos was appointed Gau speaker, envisioning border adjustments in the southwest, particularly after the perceived success of Operation Barbarossa. He stated:

What will happen with Switzerland is up to the Führer. We, opposite the Swiss city of Basel – and this is likely the wish of the entire border population – hope that the arbitrary political borders, almost Polish in nature, will be recognized as untenable and eliminated in the future.

Boos aimed to position himself as a visionary but faced internal party resistance.

Despite its distance from war fronts, Lörrach felt the war's impact. The Basel border was closed and mined. During the Battle of France, evacuees crowded the marketplace. From 1937, construction vehicles transported materials from Isteiner Klotz for Westwall bunkers. On May 19, 1939, Adolf Hitler visited Kirchen and the fortified ridge near Lörrach. From June 16 to 18, 1940, railway guns fired from Lörrach toward Belfort. The French counterattack devastated Haltingen and nearby villages. On April 24, 1945, French tanks reached the Lucke Pass, one being destroyed from Brombach. This marked one of the final wartime actions, culminating in Lörrach's occupation by the French. After a futile defense with the Volkssturm, Boos was removed, and Joseph Pfeffer was appointed interim mayor. Between 1943 and 1945, sporadic bombings occurred, including a bombing of Brombach in 1945. Lörrach was largely spared destruction. By war's end, 1,792 men from Lörrach, Stetten, Tüllingen, Tumringen, Haagen, Hauingen, and Brombach had died.

On January 2, 1940, Cologne cyclist Albert Richter died in Lörrach's prison, officially by suicide, though likely murdered by the Gestapo. In 2010, a street in Lörrach was named after him.

==== Persecution of Jews During National Socialism ====
Mayor Reinhard Boos, known for his disdain for religion, harbored antisemitic views aligned with Nazi racial ideology and was particularly hostile to Judaism as a religion. Many Jews in Lörrach fled to Switzerland in 1933 following the Nazi seizure of power. The Nuremberg Laws of 1935 stripped local Jews of citizenship. The Reichskristallnacht of November 9, 1938, ended Jewish business life in Lörrach. Between 30 and 40 men, including the municipal works director and his staff, forcibly entered the 130-year-old synagogue, destroying its interior. The devastated synagogue was later demolished, with the city downplaying the destruction by citing the roof's prior need for repair.

In 1940, the Jewish community was forced to cede the old Jewish cemetery's land to the city. Repressions peaked with the Wagner-Bürckel Action on October 22, 1940, deporting over 6,000 Jews from Baden, the Palatinate, and Saarland, including Lörrach's last 50 Jews, to the Gurs Internment Camp in France.

==== Post-War Years to 1960 ====
On May 2, 1945, the French occupation appointed Joseph Pfeffer as mayor. The provisional administration ensured aid for the population, equipping households from confiscated soldier accommodations. Generous food donations from Switzerland, including from the Swiss Protestant Church Aid, Workers' Aid, Caritas, Christian Emergency Aid, and the Swiss Red Cross, alleviated post-war hardship. The 1947 drought worsened conditions, making aid critical. Initially, Pfeffer operated without a city council, as it was not permitted. Political forces reorganized in 1946, and on September 22, 1946, Pfeffer was elected by the council. A Baden municipal ordinance in 1948 led to council elections on November 14 and mayoral elections on December 5. Due to age, Pfeffer did not run, and SPD candidate Arend Braye was elected mayor on December 5, 1948.

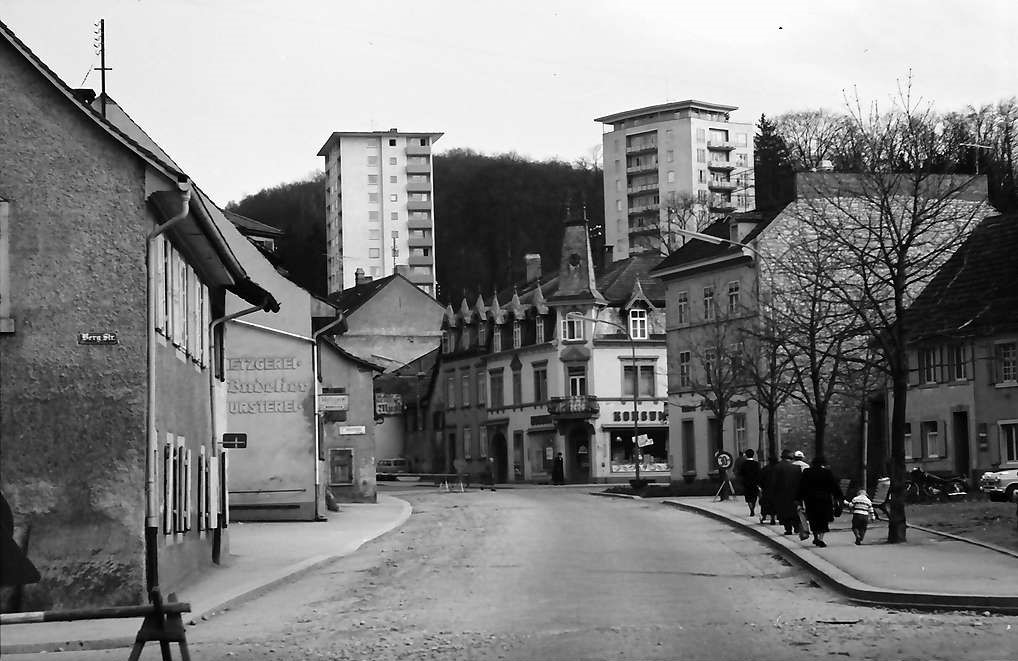
Lörrach’s first high-rise residential buildings in Rheinfelderstraße (built 1954), pictured in 1960

The post-war years saw rapid population growth due to refugees and expellees. To address housing needs, the Nordstadt was developed from wasteland north of the city center. Minimal war damage attracted job seekers, exacerbated by a shortage of skilled workers in the late 1950s, worsened by cross-border commuters seeking better wages in Switzerland. From about 20,000 post-war residents, the population grew to over 30,000 by 1960, including 7,500 expellees and refugees from eastern Germany and the GDR. The foreign population nearly doubled from 1950 to 1960, reaching 1,055. In 1956, Wohnbau Lörrach was founded to meet housing demands.

The 1959 council elections shifted the political landscape, with the CDU gaining six seats, matching the SPD. The SPD, with its Lörrach branch founded in October 1868, five years after the national party, had a strong local tradition. In August 1960, Mayor Braye died unexpectedly at 70. On November 13, Egon Hugenschmidt, aligned with the CDU, won the mayoral election with 57.70% of 13,529 votes, with a 70.53% turnout.

==== 1960 to the End of the Century ====
The 1960s saw the development of the Salzert settlement and the Bühl in Brombach to address housing shortages from both world wars, neglected during the 1920s and Nazi era. In February 1960, the Salzert development plan for a satellite town was approved, allocating 23 hectares east of Stetten. Construction began on April 16, 1963, with the first single-family home. Within three years, over 2,000 people lived in Salzert. Initially controversial due to its exposed hilltop location with one access road, the low land price of five Marks per square meter enabled affordable homeownership and rentals.

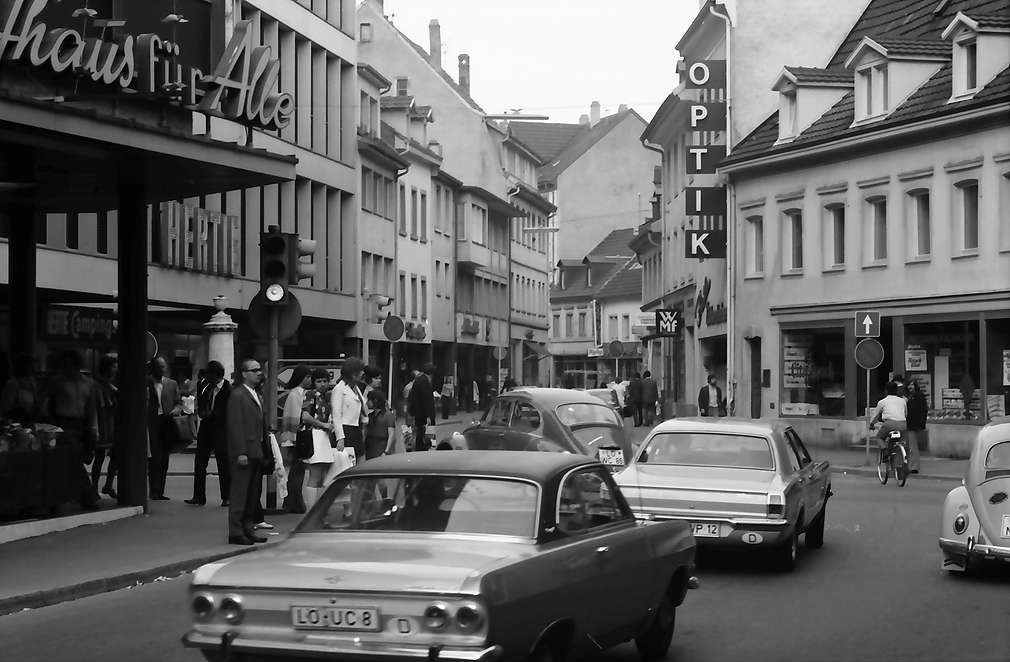
Lörrach’s city center in 1972: the Turmstraße intersection (now a pedestrian zone)

The 1964 General Transportation Plan by Ulm professor Schächterle guided city planning, proposing a bypass for the B 316 from Lucke to Waidhof and the new B 317 from Steinen along the Wiese, extending as a toll-free road from Stetten's border to Weil am Rhein. Approved by a citizens' assembly on May 19, 1964, it built on a 1955 zoning with Brombach, Haagen, and Hauingen, expanded to include Inzlingen in 1973. The 1960s saw extensive urban renewal, with decommissioned factory sites like the former Conradi spinning and weaving mill repurposed. New housing was built in the city center and periphery, including a 1973 high-rise at the marketplace. The pedestrian zone was delayed as Turmstraße was a federal road. Its downgrade to a municipal road followed the western one-way ring's construction, alongside the A 98 bypass from Lucke to Waidhof. Under Mayor Hugenschmidt, the pedestrian zone plan was adopted in 1975, with Turmstraße's conversion starting in 1978.

On January 1, 1974, Haagen was incorporated. In 1975, Lörrach merged with Brombach and Hauingen, forming the modern city with three urban and three rural districts, each with a local administrator. To meet administrative needs, a modern 17-story green high-rise replaced the Villa Favre, used as the town hall since 1927. Mayor Hugenschmidt inaugurated the new town hall on June 13, 1976.

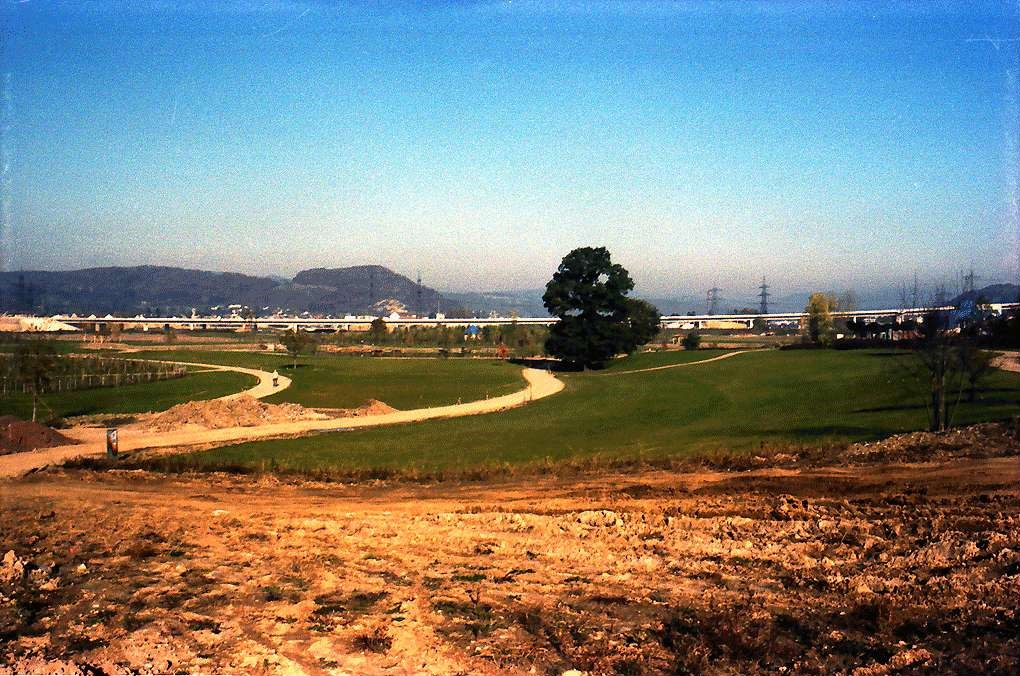
Construction of the Grütt state garden show site (1982)

On March 27, 1979, Lörrach decided to host the 4th State Garden Show in 1983. The 51-hectare Grütt area, previously agricultural wasteland between Lörrach's core, Tumringen, Brombach, and Haagen, was transformed into a sports and leisure facility. Deep wells for Lörrach's water supply were developed, alongside road integration (A 98, B 317), sports facilities, and a campsite expansion. On March 20, 1982, a tree-planting event involved the Black Forest Association, Friends of Nature, and volunteers. The rose garden was completed by summer, and the garden show opened on April 15, 1983, during Lörrach's 300th city rights anniversary, attracting about one million visitors by October 16.

Rainer Offergeld, former Federal Minister for Economic Cooperation under Chancellor Helmut Schmidt, succeeded Hugenschmidt as mayor in 1984. His tenure advanced the pedestrian zone expansion. In 1986, a new traffic concept closed Basler Straße from the Herrenstraße intersection, followed by Tumringer Straße and Teichstraße. These areas were paved, and the pedestrian zone was inaugurated in 1991. Over time, 22 sculptures were installed along the Lörrach Sculpture Path, featuring works by Stephan Balkenhol, Bruce Nauman, and Ulrich Rückriem. On April 2, 1995, Gudrun Heute-Bluhm was elected mayor, serving until 2014. Her tenure saw the construction of the Burghof in 1998, replacing the old city hall as a cultural venue, and the innocel Innovation Center.

=== The 21st Century ===
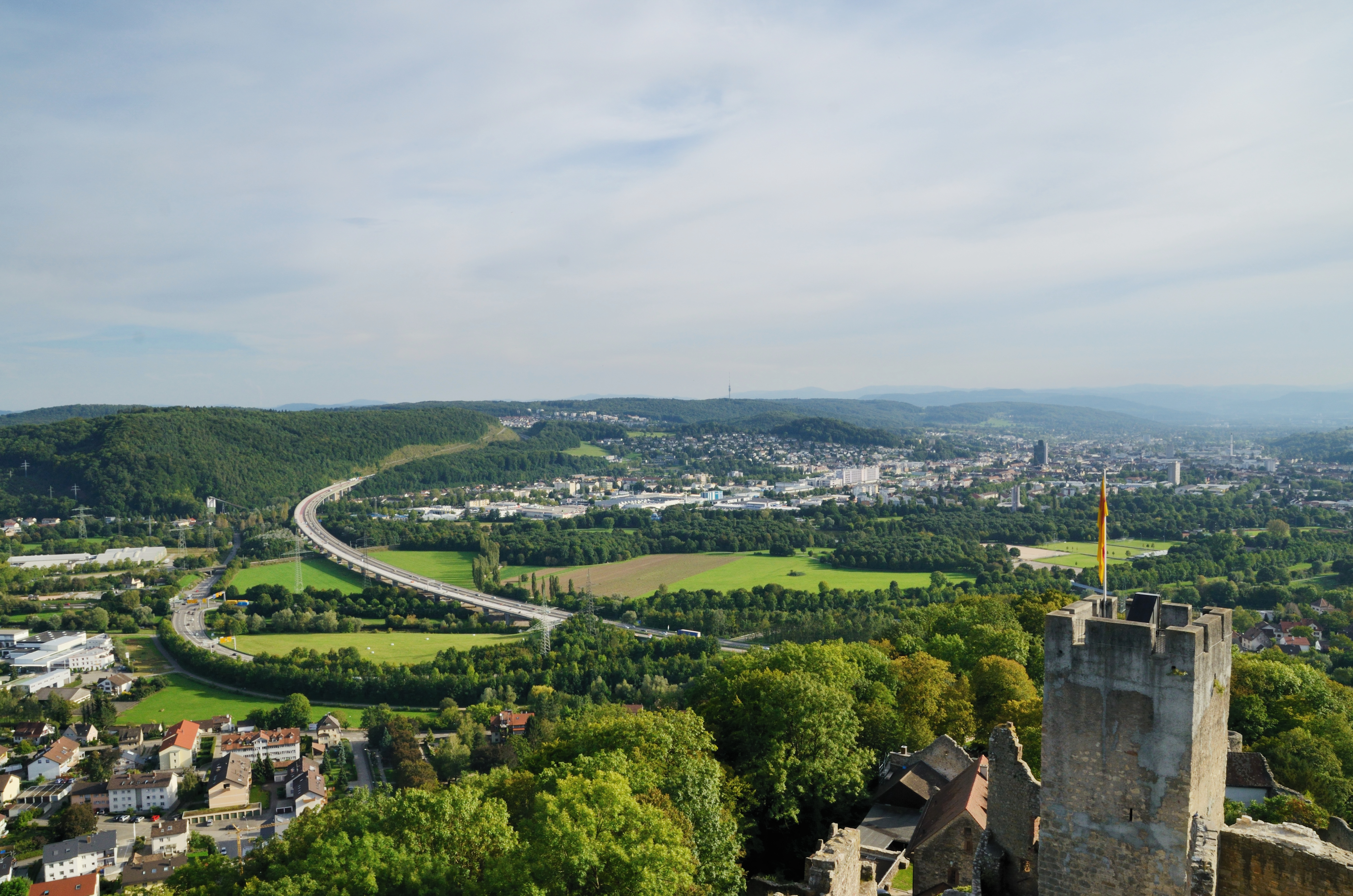
Modern Lörrach from the north (2012)

In 2000, a 12,000-square-meter business park was established for information technology and life sciences companies. In 2002, Lörrach celebrated its 900th anniversary with a year-long program. That year, it became the first German municipality to receive Switzerland's Energiestadt label, earning the European Energy Award gold three times for its plan to become climate-neutral by 2050. The Niederfeldplatz Residential Quarter, Germany's first CO_{2}-neutral housing complex, is a flagship project.

On November 9, 2008, 70 years after its Nazi-era destruction, the new synagogue was inaugurated in the city center with then-Minister President Günther Oettinger present. The cube-shaped design was by Lörrach's Wilhelm, Hovenbitzer, and Partner architects.

On September 19, 2010, a mass shooting at St. Elisabethen Hospital killed three people and injured 18, sparking a nationwide debate on tightening Germany's gun laws.

Among the largest projects in decades is the planned Central Hospital at the city's northern edge. Groundbreaking occurred in January 2020. Infrastructure improvements include rerouting the L138 state road, a new S-Bahn stop, and a modified B 317 connection. The hospital, planned for the Entenbad-Nord area, will cover 7–8 hectares with about 700 beds, with construction costs, including medical technology, estimated at 239 million euros. Construction began in 2020, targeting completion in 2025.

Since May 2019, the Lö, a residential and commercial building, has been under construction on the former central post office site at Bahnhofsplatz. It will feature 13,000 square meters of commercial space, 59 apartments, and a 192-vehicle underground garage, with completion planned for 2020.

In the first quarter of 2023, Lörrach's population exceeded 50,000, reaching 50,208. This milestone increases the number of councilors from 32 to 40, effective after the 2024 municipal election if the population growth persists. Per legal provisions, prostitution is permitted in cities with over 50,000 residents, requiring a designated restricted zone.

During the protests against right-wing extremism, a large demonstration on January 27, 2024, drew about 4,000 participants. On February 3, 2024, over 1,000 people protested in Brombach, with Marcus Bensmann from Correctiv speaking, whose investigation into the 2023 Potsdam meeting sparked nationwide protests.
