= 2010 Lörrach hospital shooting =

Mass shooting in Baden-Württemberg, Germany

Lörrach hospital shooting
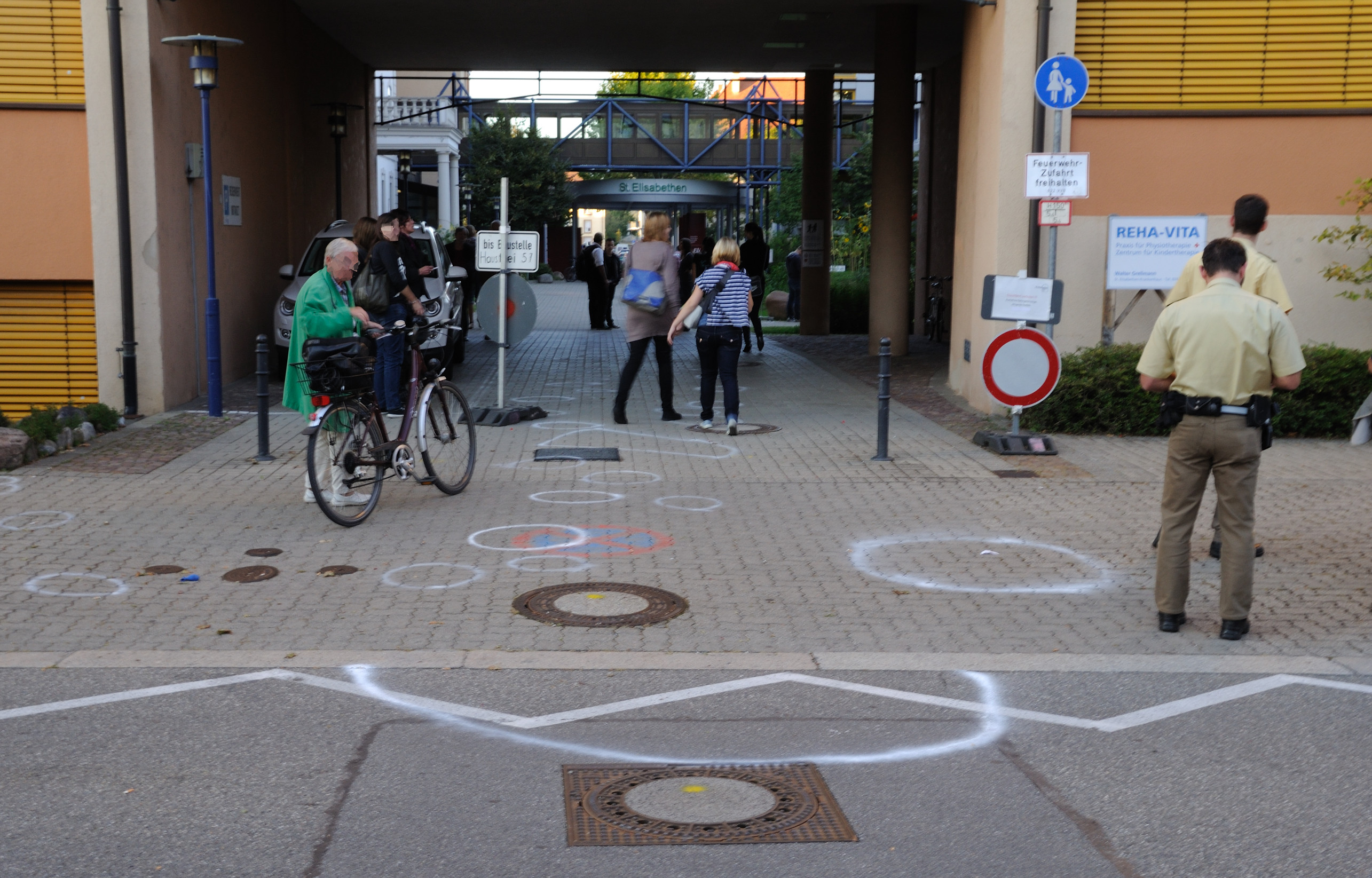
- Crime scene at St. Elisabethen-Krankenhaus Hospital (20 September 2010)
- Location: St. Elisabethen-Krankenhaus Hospital; Lörrach, Baden-Württemberg, Germany
- Date: 19 September 2010 c. 6:00 p.m. – c. 6:39 p.m. (CEST)
- Attack type: Mass shooting, arson, stabbing, familicide, asphyxiation, shootout
- Weapons: .22-calibre Walther GSP; Knife
- Deaths: 4 (including the perpetrator)
- Injuries: 18 (3 from gunfire)
- Perpetrator: Sabine Radmacher

On 19 September 2010, a mass shooting and arson attack took place in Lörrach, Baden-Württemberg Germany. In an apartment building, 41-year-old Sabine Radmacher killed her separated husband and their five-year-old son before setting a fire in the flat. On the street below, Radmacher injured two passersby with gunshots before entering a nearby hospital, where she fatally stabbed a nurse and injured an off-duty police officer. Soon after, Radmacher was fatally shot by SEK units.

== Background ==
Lörrach is located near the Swiss and French border and due to its location, it is a vital industrial part of Trinational Eurodistrict of Basel. The town's crime rates were on a steady decline since 2000 and although overall rates were above the district average, the statistics remained generally below the national median.

The prior year the 2009 Winnenden and Wendlingen shootings took place in the state, where a teenage gunman killed twelve people at his school in Winnenden before killing three civilians and then committing suicide in Wendlingen. The incident triggered off a debate in Germany on tougher gun ownership laws.

== Killings ==
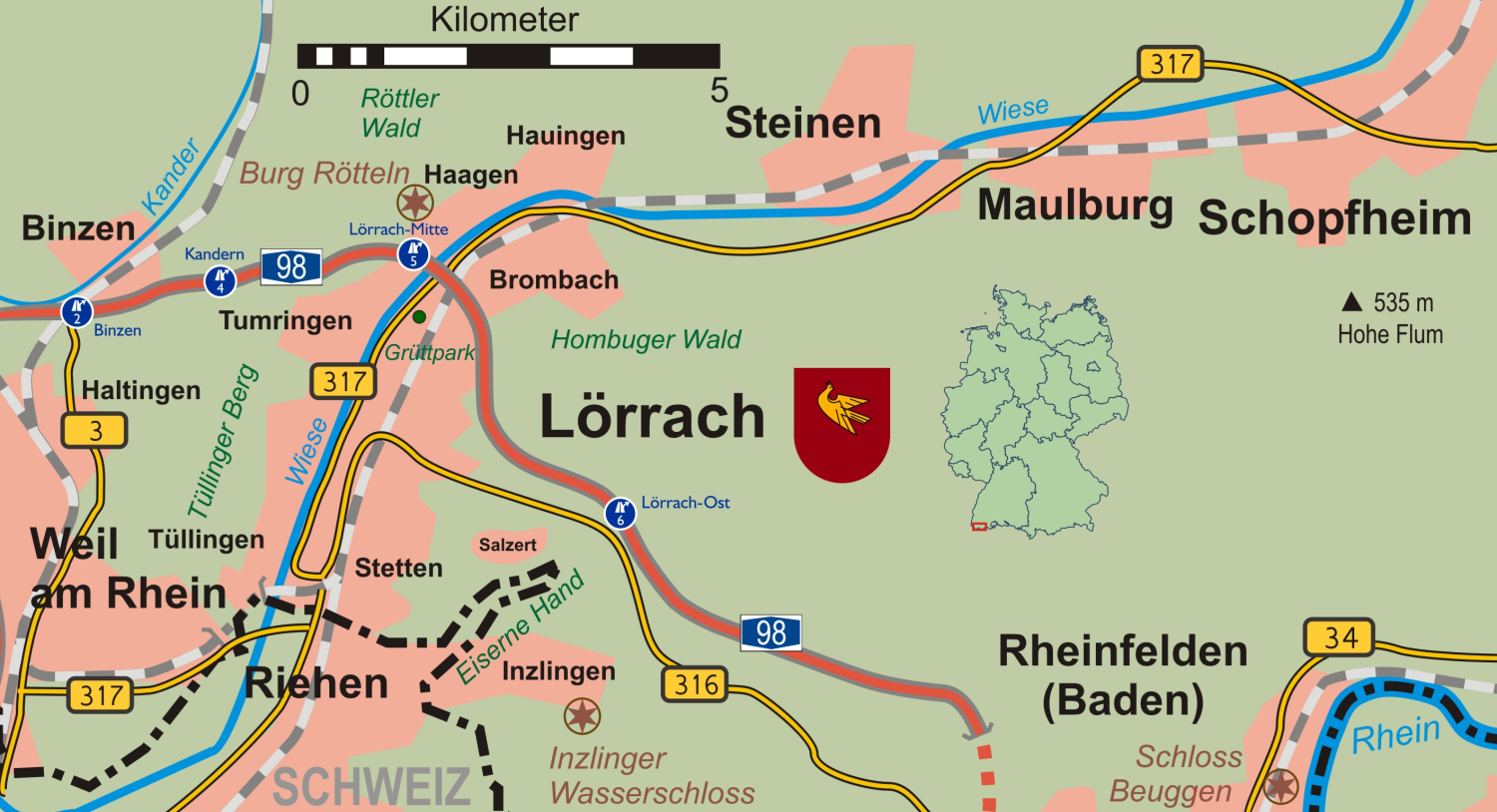
The attack location

The initial murders occurred shortly before 6:00 p.m. inside Sabine Radmacher's apartment on Markus-Pflüger-Straße, which doubled as her lawyer's office. Radmacher killed her 44-year-old husband with two gunshots in the head and neck after he entered. Afterwards, she knocked their son unconscious with several blows to the head before suffocating him with a plastic bag. Radmacher then covered the rooms of her apartment with 70 liters of a mixture of nitro thinner, gasoline, and ethanol before setting a fire, causing an explosion, due to which 15 people, all residents of the same building, suffered the effects of smoke inhalation.

At approximately 6:04 p.m., Radmacher crossed the street to the St. Elisabethen Hospital, carrying 300 rounds of ammunition with her. Neighbours later stating that she appeared calm and "strolled" at a leisurely pace. She heavily injured two passers-by with gunshots, striking one in the back and grazing the other in the head, before entering the hospital through the front entrance. First responders in the form of the fire department arrived two minutes later. After taking the stairs up to the first floor to the gynaecology ward, Radmacher killed a 56-year-old surgical nurse with three shots in the head and numerous stab wounds. The nurse had prevented her from going further into the floor and is credited with saving lives through this action. Radmacher also injured a police officer, who was privately at the hospital, with a shot in the kneecap. Police arrived shortly after and exchanged fire with Radmacher for around ten minutes before SEK killed her with 17 gunshots.

== Aftermath ==
The shooting led to renewed political discourse over gun control, particularly tighter regulations over the firearms that can be accessed with a gun permit in relation to Schützenverein membership, as well as the storage of weapons and ammunition.

50 police officers involved in the response unit received psychological counselling, 17 of whom required "intensive care".

== Perpetrator ==
Police identified the shooter as 41-year-old lawyer Sabine Radmacher. She was later also connected to the apartment explosion.

Radmacher was born in Ludwigshafen, Rhineland-Palatinate in 1969. She previously worked as a paralegal for a law firm until December 2009, when she earned her lawyer's licence. She was described as a sporting markswoman and had used a .22 calibre Walther GSP during the rampage, with another three small calibre firearms being recovered from the scene. Several long rifles were also found at an acquaintance's home, whom she had entrusted the weapons for safekeeping. The acquaintance, a hobby hunter, also stated that Radmacher voiced an interest in becoming a licensed hunter before the killings. The sporting club in Mosbach she was signed under later stated that Radmacher had not been a member since 1996, yet was able to keep her sporting weapons.

Before moving to Lörrach following her separation, Radmacher lived in Häg-Ehrsberg. Since June 2010, she was separated from her husband Wolfgang Radmacher, who kept custody over their son at her request, but the pair had arranged for their son to live with his mother on the weekends. Radmacher's husband had been at her apartment to fetch their son the day of the shootings.

Radmacher's motive was not ascertained by police, who ruled out a custody dispute. Investigators assume that she planned the fire in advance, as indicated by the amount of accelerant she hoarded and used for the arson. Neighbours variously described Radmacher as a confident, friendly and ambitious woman who dressed sharply and drove a Mercedes she bought with her own money, while others noted that she was surly and erratic with "strange priorities", having clashed with her old employer who threatened to sue her, over which she contacted a journalist to publish an account, which was described as "incoherent". Due to her targeting of the St. Elisabethen Hospital, investigators also considered possible trauma stemming from pregnancy loss, as Radmacher experienced the miscarriage of a previous child in the 16th week at the clinic in 2004. In 2006, she applied for a position in management at the clinic, but it was not accepted.

== See also ==
- History of Lörrach
