= Untitled (Rückriem) =

1987 granite sculpture by Ulrich Rückriem in Chicago, Illinois, U.S.

Coordinates: 41°52′50.4″N 87°37′24.6″W

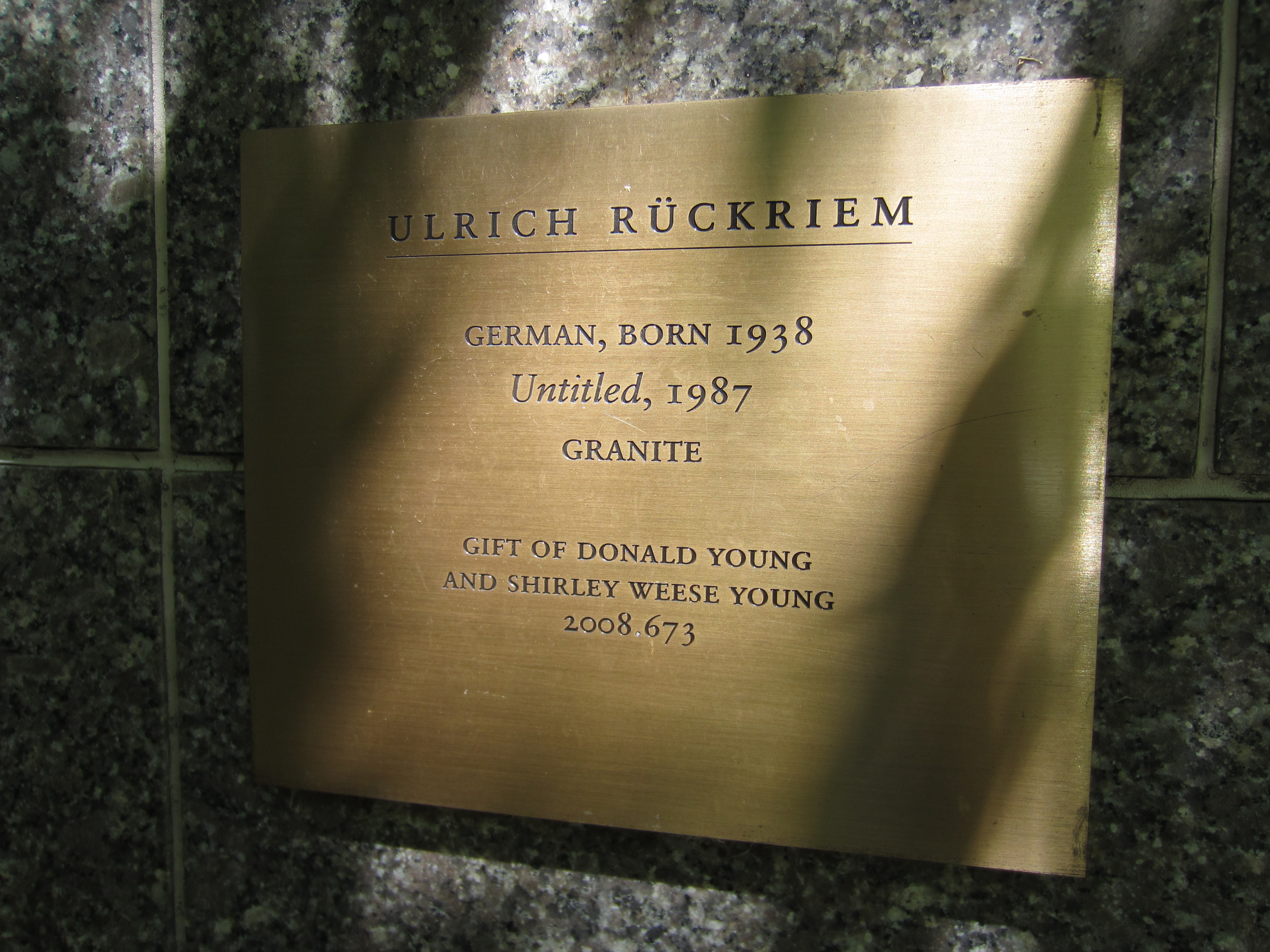
- Plaque for the sculpture
- Artist: Ulrich Rückriem
- Year: 1987
- Medium: Granite
- Dimensions: 266.7 cm × 35.6 cm × 579.1 cm (105.0 in × 14.0 in × 228.0 in)
- Location: Art Institute of Chicago, Chicago, Illinois, United States

Untitled is an outdoor 1987 granite sculpture by Ulrich Rückriem, installed outside the Art Institute of Chicago, in the U.S. state of Illinois.

== See also ==
- 1987 in art
- List of public art in Chicago
