= Statue of Dolly Parton =

Monument in Sevierville, Tennessee

- Interactive map of Statue of Dolly Parton
- Location: 125 Court Avenue, Sevierville, Tennessee, United States
- Coordinates: 35°52′03.86″N 83°33′56.55″W
- Designer: Jim Gray
- Type: Statue
- Material: Bronze (statue); stone (pedestal)
- Opening date: May 3, 1987
- Dedicated to: Dolly Parton

The statue of Dolly Parton is a monument in the city of Sevierville in Tennessee, United States, placed in front of the Sevier County Courthouse at 125 Court Avenue. The bronze statue depicts singer-songwriter Dolly Parton, a native of Sevierville. It was designed by Jim Gray, and unveiled on May 3, 1987.

== History ==
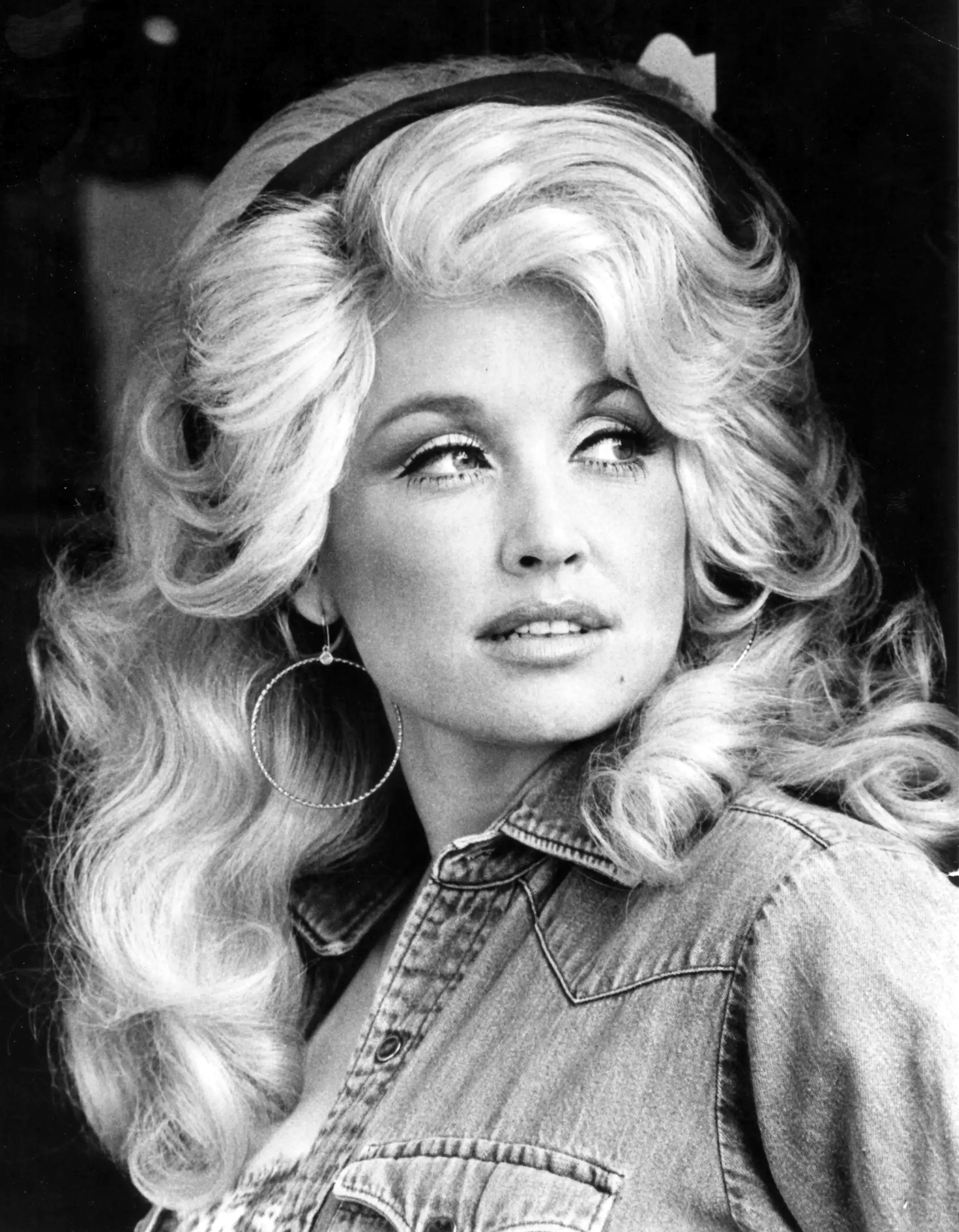
Dolly Parton, the subject of the monument.

The statue was designed by sculptor Jim Gray, based in Knoxville, Tennessee. Originally sculptured in clay, it was cast in bronze in the Wagner Foundry in Fredericksburg, Virginia. The statue was dedicated to Dolly Parton (1946–2026), a 20th- and 21st-century singer-songwriter, one of the most honored country music performers. It was unveiled in her hometown, the city of Sevierville, Tennessee, on May 3, 1987. Parton attended the ceremony and gave a speech to a crowd of around 500 people, remarking, "It makes me feel like you folks are proud of me, and I've always wanted you to be". It became one of the most visited landmarks and tourist destinations in the city.

Parton stated that her father, Robert Lee Parton Sr., would regularly clean her statue.

In the days following Parton's death on August 25, 2026, a crowd of people gathered around the statue and laid flowers by it to pay tribune to her. The day after her death, a bell in the courthouse building rang a reverent toll for five minutes, and five minutes of silence were observed in a tribue to Parton.

== Design ==
The monument takes the form of a bronze, life-sized statue placed on a large rock. It depicts Parton as a young woman dressed in a shirt and jeans, without shoes, sitting on the rock. She holds a guitar on her lap. The statue is placed in front of the Sevier County Courthouse, a historic Romanesque Revival building from 1895, located at 125 Court Avenue.
