= 1987 in fine arts of the Soviet Union =

The year 1987 was marked by many events that left an imprint on the history of Soviet and Russian Fine Arts.

== Events ==
- Exhibition of works by Piotr Belousov was opened in the Museum of the Academy of Arts in Leningrad
- Traditional Exhibition of works of Leningrad artists – the Great Patriotic War veterans was opened in the Leningrad Union of Artists on the eve of Victory Day (9 May).
- Exhibition of works by Boris Nikolaev was opened in the Leningrad Union of Artists.
- Exhibition of works by Sergei Frolov was opened in the Leningrad Union of Artists.
- Exhibition of works by Alexander Semionov (1922–1984) was opened in the Leningrad Union of Artists.
- A Retrospective Exhibition named «The Exempt Man» dedicated to 70th Anniversary of Great October revolution of 1917 was opened in Russian museum in Leningrad. The participants were Nathan Altman, Vladimir Lebedev, Evsey Moiseenko, Andrei Mylnikov, Kuzma Petrov-Vodkin, Alexander Romanychev, Alexander Samokhvalov, Vitaly Tulenev, Boris Ugarov, and other important soviet artists.
- An exhibition of works by Soviet artists, dedicated to the 150th anniversary of the country's railways (Moscow). Works by artists Vitaly Tyulenev, Dolgorukova (Zhudro) Yulia, Yakovlev Andrew, Nicholas Kozlenko, Kozorezenko Peter, Olga Davydova, Karachentsev Peter, Alexei Kazantsev and others.

== Deaths ==
- February 20 — Lev Russov (Russian: Русов Лев Александрович), Russian soviet painter, sculptor, graphic artist (b. 1926).
- March 15 — Victor Oreshnikov, (Russian: Орешников Виктор Михайлович), Russian soviet painter, graphic artist, and art educator, People's Artist of the USSR (b. 1904).
- May 5 — Alexander Shmidt (Russian: Шмидт Александр Владимирович), Russian soviet painter and graphic artist (b. 1911).
- June 18 — Georgy Nissky (Russian: Нисский Георгий Григорьевич), Russian soviet painter (b. 1903).
- July 7 — Yuri Podlasky (Russian: Подляский Юрий Станиславович), Russian soviet painter, Honored Art worker of the Russian Federation, People's Artist of the RSFSR (b. 1923).
- November 2 — Galina Yakhontova (Russian: Яхонтова Галина Святославовна), Russian soviet painter and theatre artist (b. 1917).
- December 17 — Ivan Savenko, (Russian: Савенко Иван Григорьевич), Russian soviet painter, Honored Artist of the Russian Federation (b. 1924).
- December 31 — Piotr Kiparisov (Russian: Кипарисов Пётр Гаврилович), Russian soviet painter and art educator (b. 1928).

== See also ==
- List of Russian artists
- List of painters of Leningrad Union of Artists
- Saint Petersburg Union of Artists
- Russian culture

== Sources ==
- Сергей Кузьмич Фролов. Выставка произведений. Каталог. Л., Художник РСФСР, 1986.
- Белоусов Петр Петрович. Каталог выставки. Л., Искусство, 1987.
- Александр Михайлович Семенов. Выставка произведений. Л., ЛОСХ, 1987.
- Николаев Борис Павлович. Выставка произведений. Каталог. Л., ЛОСХ, 1987.
- Елена Павловна Жукова. Выставка произведений. Каталог. Л., Художник РСФСР, 1987.
- Ольга Борисовна Богаевская. Выставка произведений. Каталог. Л., Художник РСФСР, 1987.
- Artists of Peoples of the USSR. Biography Dictionary. Vol. 1. Moscow, Iskusstvo, 1970.
- Artists of Peoples of the USSR. Biography Dictionary. Vol. 2. Moscow, Iskusstvo, 1972.
- Directory of Members of Union of Artists of USSR. Volume 1,2. Moscow, Soviet Artist Edition, 1979.
- Directory of Members of the Leningrad branch of the Union of Artists of Russian Federation. Leningrad, Khudozhnik RSFSR, 1980.
- Artists of Peoples of the USSR. Biography Dictionary. Vol. 4 Book 1. Moscow, Iskusstvo, 1983.
- Directory of Members of the Leningrad branch of the Union of Artists of Russian Federation. – Leningrad: Khudozhnik RSFSR, 1987.
- Artists of peoples of the USSR. Biography Dictionary. Vol. 4 Book 2. – Saint Petersburg: Academic project humanitarian agency, 1995.
- Link of Times: 1932 – 1997. Artists – Members of Saint Petersburg Union of Artists of Russia. Exhibition catalogue. – Saint Petersburg: Manezh Central Exhibition Hall, 1997.
- Matthew C. Bown. Dictionary of 20th Century Russian and Soviet Painters 1900-1980s. – London: Izomar, 1998.
- Vern G. Swanson. Soviet Impressionism. – Woodbridge, England: Antique Collectors' Club, 2001.
- Время перемен. Искусство 1960—1985 в Советском Союзе. СПб., Государственный Русский музей, 2006.
- Sergei V. Ivanov. Unknown Socialist Realism. The Leningrad School. – Saint-Petersburg: NP-Print Edition, 2007. – ISBN 5-901724-21-6, ISBN 978-5-901724-21-7.
- Anniversary Directory graduates of Saint Petersburg State Academic Institute of Painting, Sculpture, and Architecture named after Ilya Repin, Russian Academy of Arts. 1915 – 2005. – Saint Petersburg: Pervotsvet Publishing House, 2007.
