= Thérèse Oulton =

English painter

Thérèse Oulton (born 1953) is an English painter. She is known for her abstract paintings of rocky landscapes.

Oulton has held solo shows at Gimpel Fils Gallery and Marlborough Gallery, and has been nominated for the Turner Prize. In 2024, Thérèse Oulton had her first solo exhibition in 10 years at Vardaxoglou Gallery.

== Biography ==
Oulton was born in Shrewsbury, Shropshire in 1953, her father was in the Royal Air Force. Growing up, Oulton learned the violin, and believes that if she had been born in London, she would have been a professional musician. She was raised in a convent and was religious as a child, however she broke from her religious background as an adult.

Inspired by the works of Henry Moore and Morris Louis, Oulton studied at Saint Martin's School of Art in the late 1970s before going on to the Royal College of Art for three years and graduating in 1983. Oulton's first solo show was the following year, in Gimpel Fils Gallery, which was "highly praised" before becoming an artist-in-residence in Melbourne. She lived in Vienna for a year, before settling in London, where she still produces her works.

In 1987, Oulton was nominated for the Turner Prize. She was represented by the Marlborough Fine Art, where she presented another solo show in 1990.

== Work ==
Oulton's work is abstract. Her early work often resembles rocky landscapes. Her later works are often executed in a thick impasto.

A number of Oulton's later works use multiple repeated images, often with slight variations between the repetitions.

Her works fetch between $60 and $13,750 US Dollars at auction.
