= Huang Yao =

Chinese artist (1917–1987)

Huang Yao (Chinese: 黄尧; pinyin: Huáng Yáo; 1917–1987) was a Chinese painter, comic artist and teacher. Born in Shanghai, he had ancestral roots in Jiashan, Zhejiang. He is known for his creation of the Niubizi (牛鼻子) cartoons in the 1930s in Shanghai.
