= Ulrich Rückriem =

German sculptor

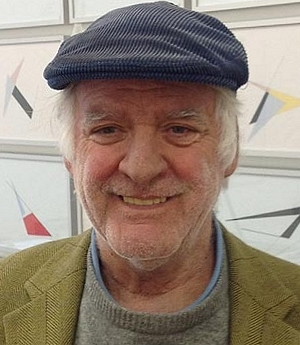
- Rückriem in 2013
- Born: 30 September 1938; Düsseldorf, Germany
- Known for: Stone sculpture, drawing
- Movement: Process art, Minimalism
- Awards: (among others) 1985: Arnold-Bode-Award of the city of the documenta, Kassel; 1998: Piepenbrock Award for Sculpture, Berlin

Ulrich Rückriem (born 30 September 1938) is a German sculptor notable for his monumental stone sculptures. He lives and works in Cologne and London. His abstract works of art are often assigned to the style of minimalism and process art.

== Life and work ==
Born in Düsseldorf, Rückriem apprenticed as a stonecutter in Düren and then worked as a journeyman at the Dombauhütte workshops of Cologne Cathedral. Later, due to his tight association with Gallery Konrad Fischer, Düsseldorf, he came into contact with artists and colleagues like Carl Andre, Richard Long, Sol LeWitt, and Royden Rabinowitch. From 1963 on, he worked as a free-lance artist.

For a few years, he shared a studio with Blinky Palermo, before he started his academic career, at Hochschule für bildende Künste Hamburg (starting from 1974), from 1984 onwards at Kunstakademie Düsseldorf, and finally at Städelschule,

In the 1960s and 1970s, Rückriem worked in the quarry of Dolomite at Anldorf, museum Städel in Frankfurt am Main, Stedelijk Museum Amsterdam and Neue Nationalgalerie Berlin followed. Rückriem was invited to participate in the documenta i.

Many of the works of art of Rückriem are accessible to the public as public art, mostly in Germany, but also in Spain, France, England, Ireland and others. A particularly impressive one of these is Siglo XX (1995), an installation in the open fields close to the locality of Abiego (Spain). It consists of 20 steles of granite from O Porriño, arranged in a manner analogous to the eight queens puzzle.

A permanent installation of about 100 sculptures by Rückriem is at Sculpture Halls Ulrich Rückriem in Sinsteden, near Cologne. The halls and presentation were devised by the artist himself.

== Gallery ==
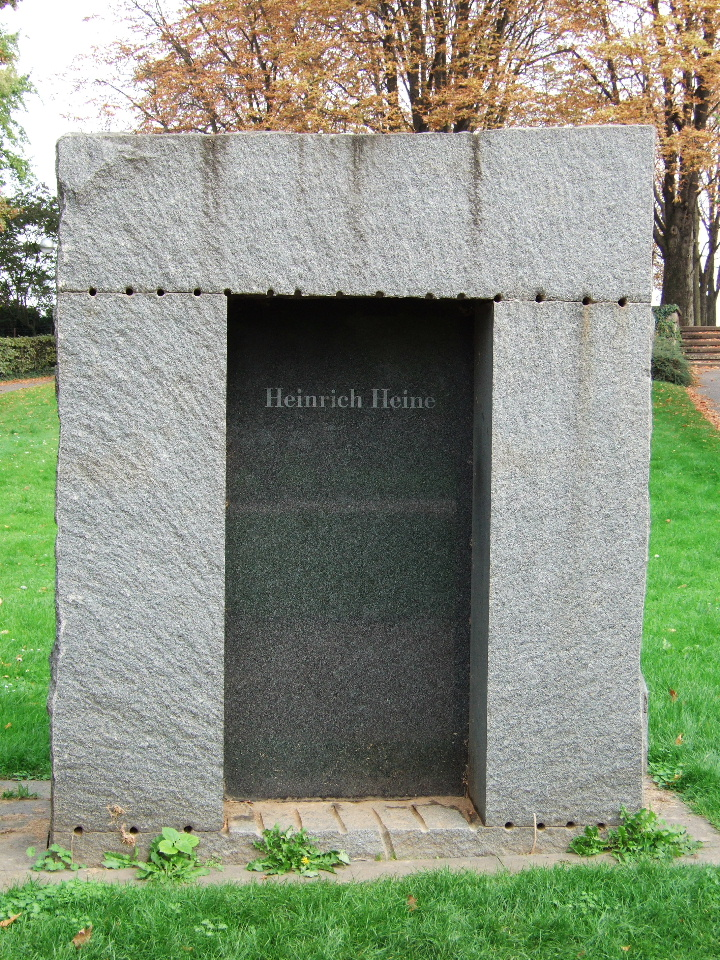
Heine-Denkmal (1982). Bonn

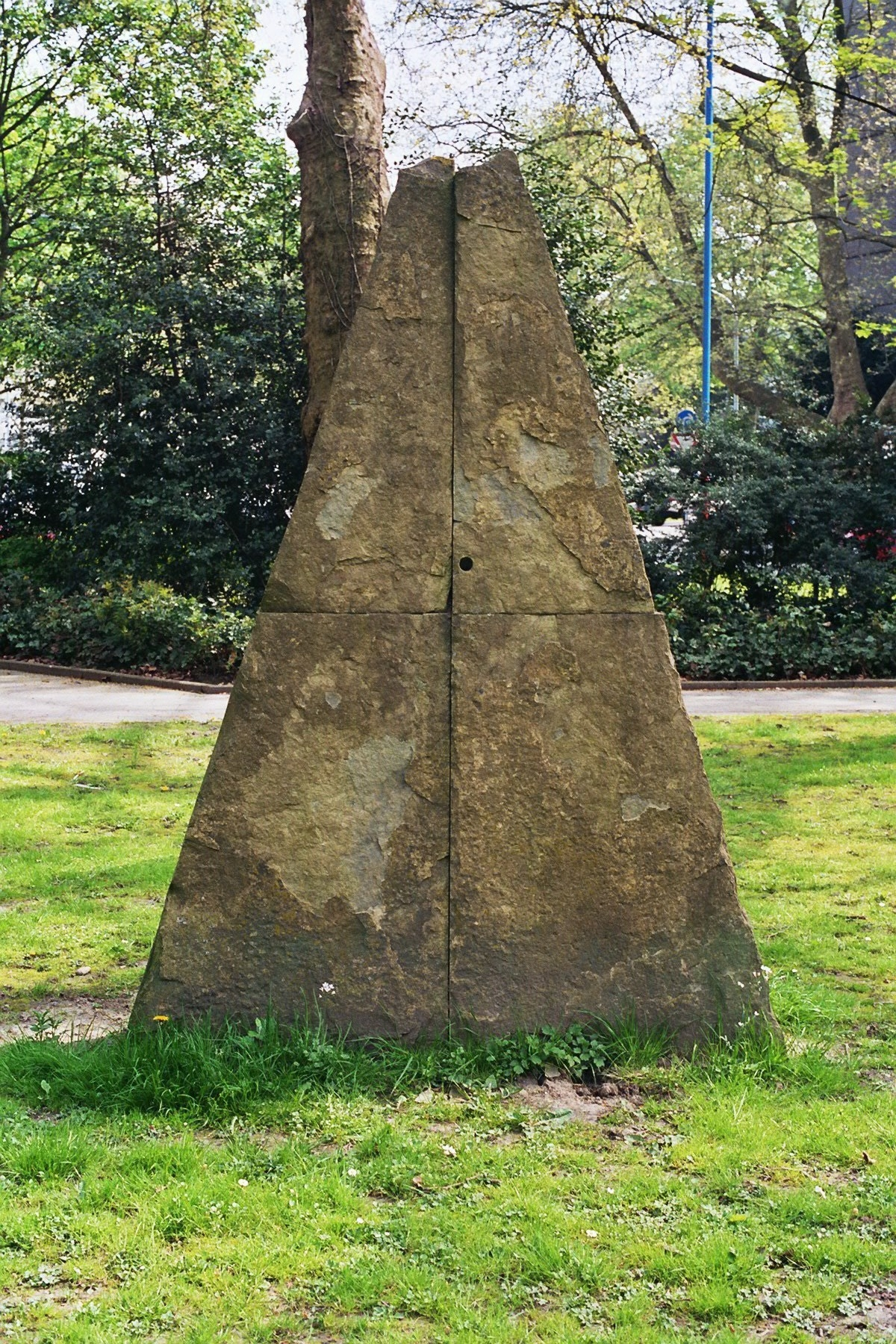
Dolomit (1983). Essen

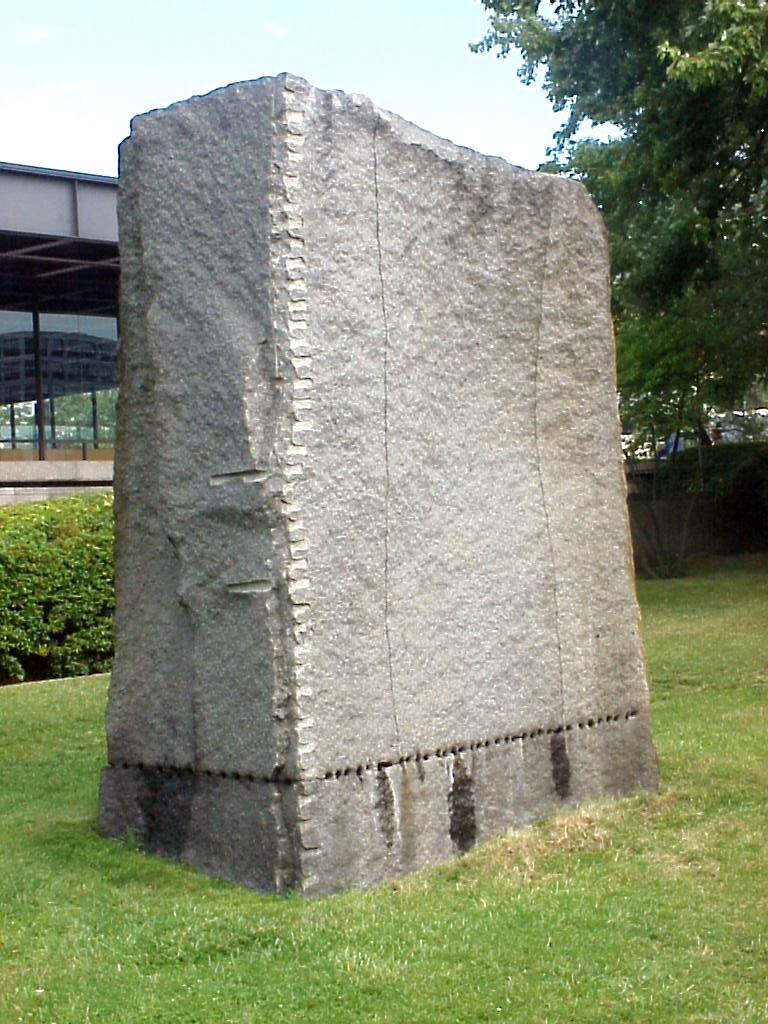
Granit (Normandie) (1985). Neue Nationalgalerie, Berlin

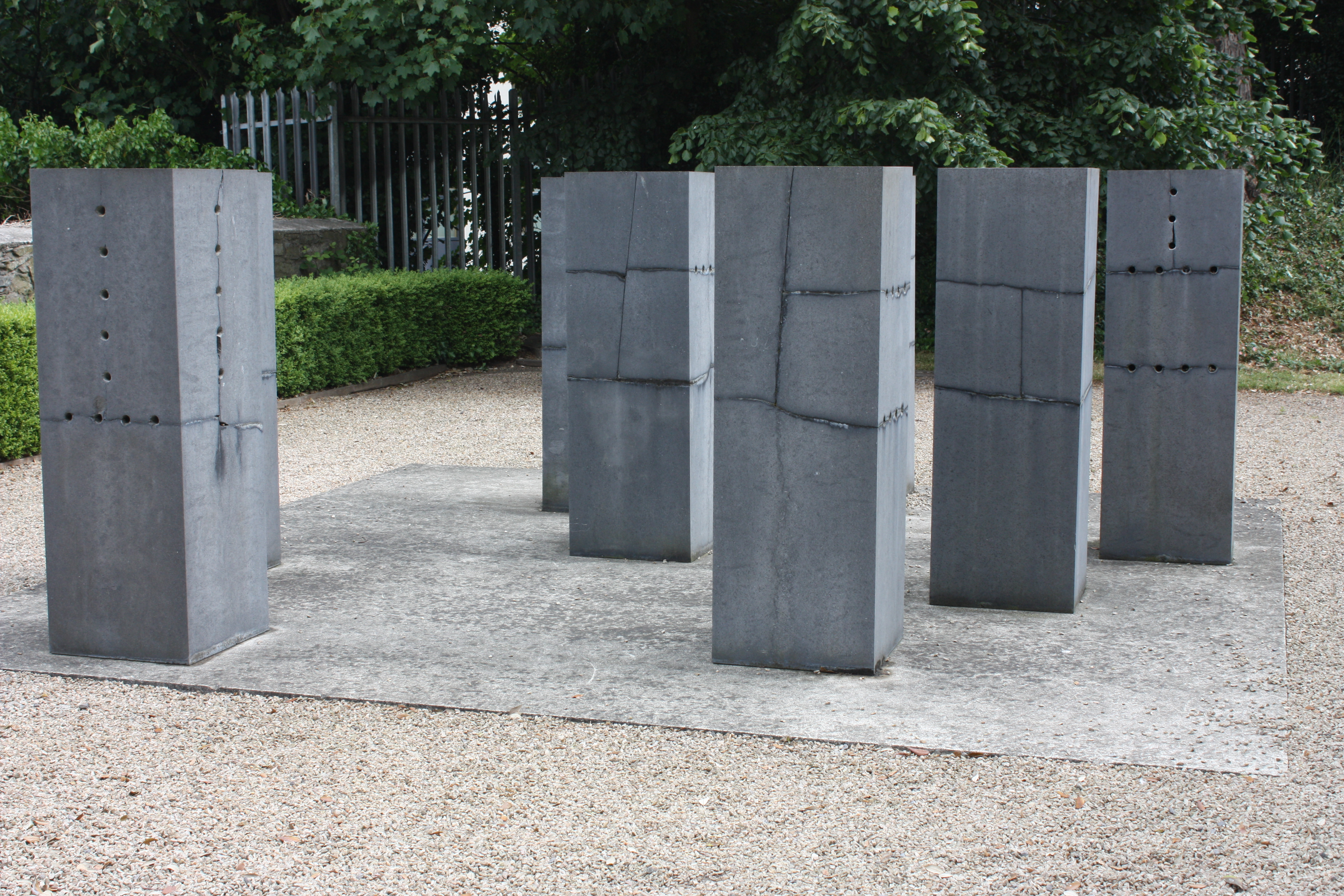
Limestone (1988). Irish Museum of Modern Art, Dublin

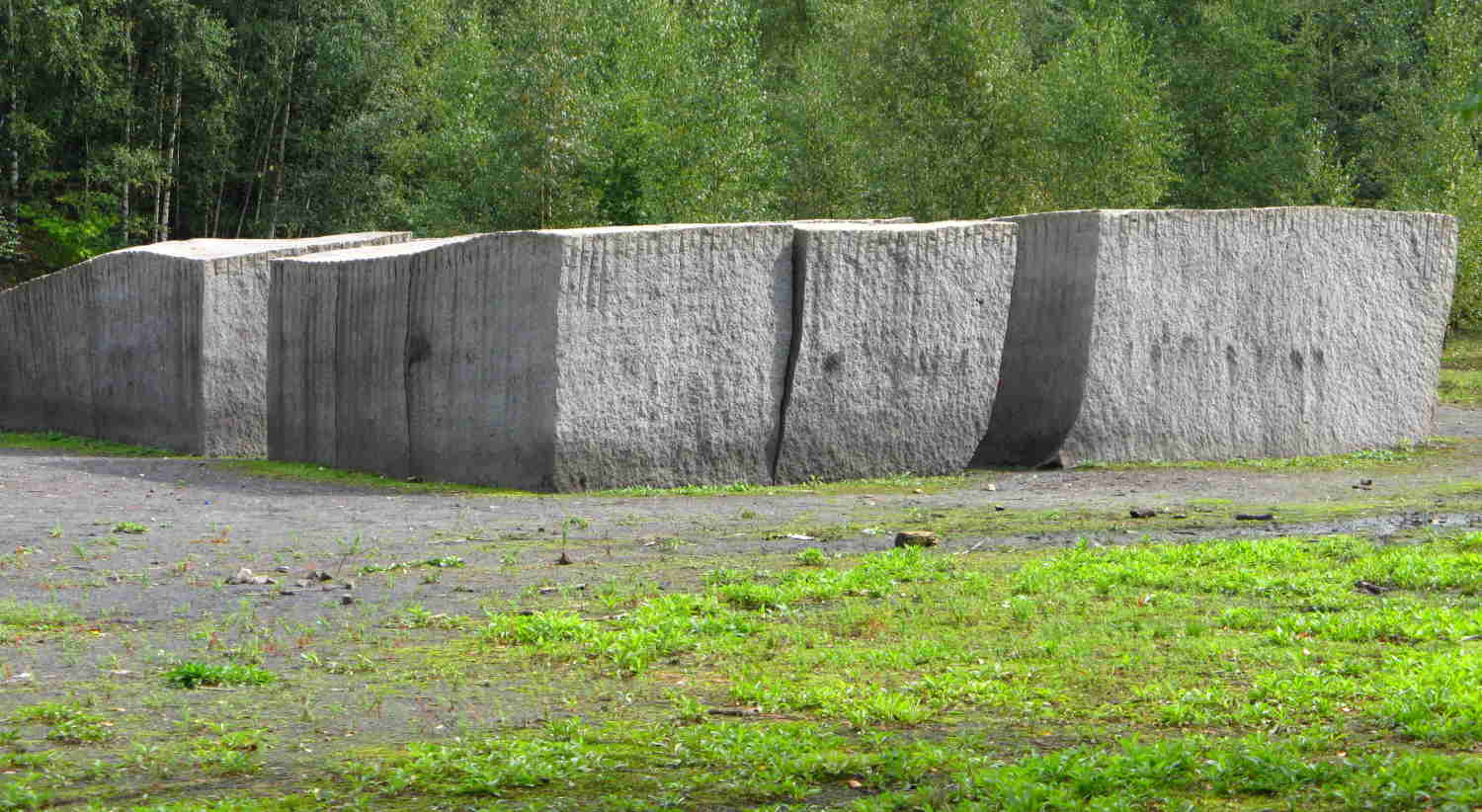
Castell (1991). Mining waste tip Zollverein at Zollverein Coal Mine Industrial Complex, Essen

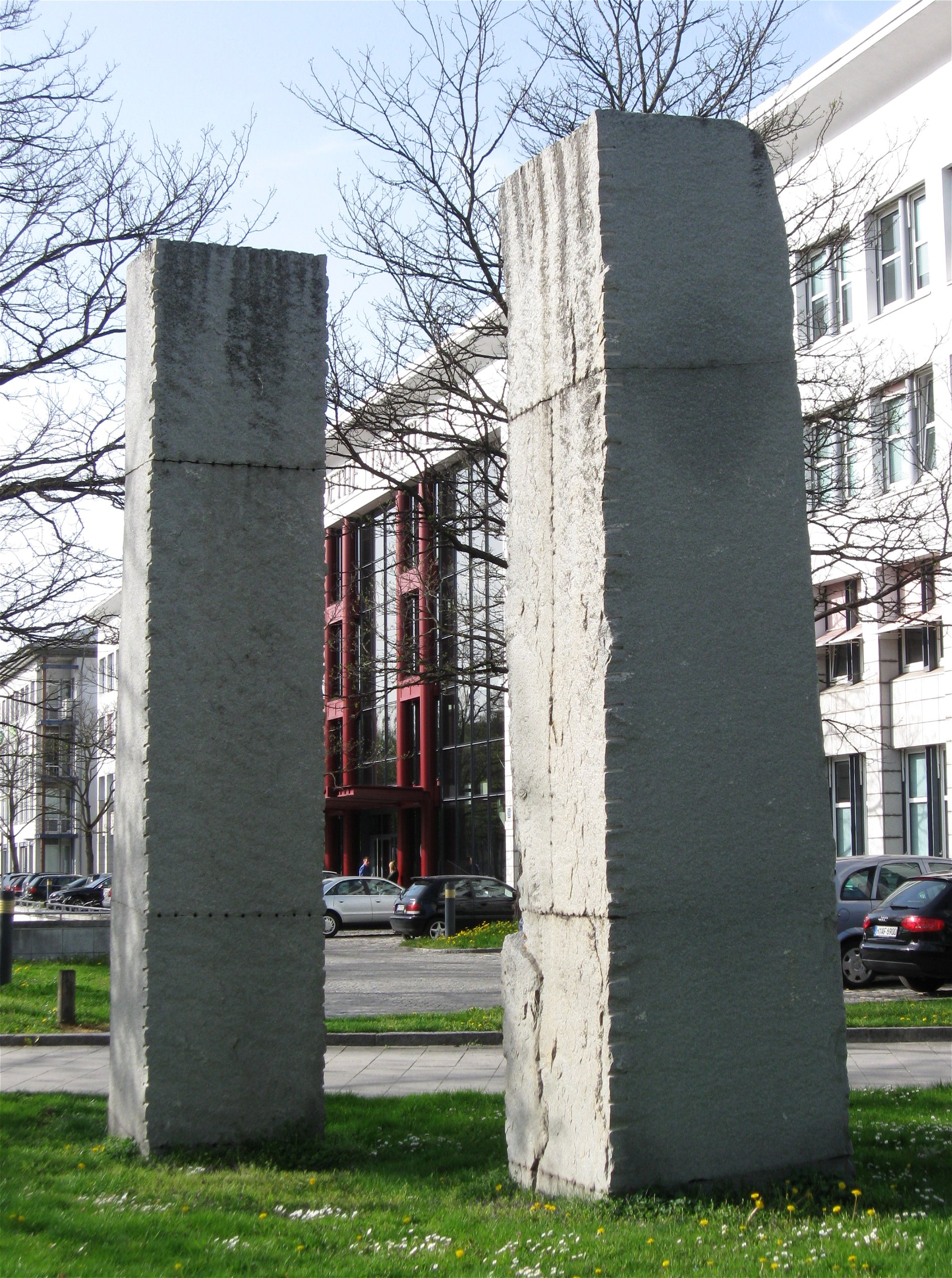
Finnischer Granit gespalten (1992/93). Goethe-Institut, Munich

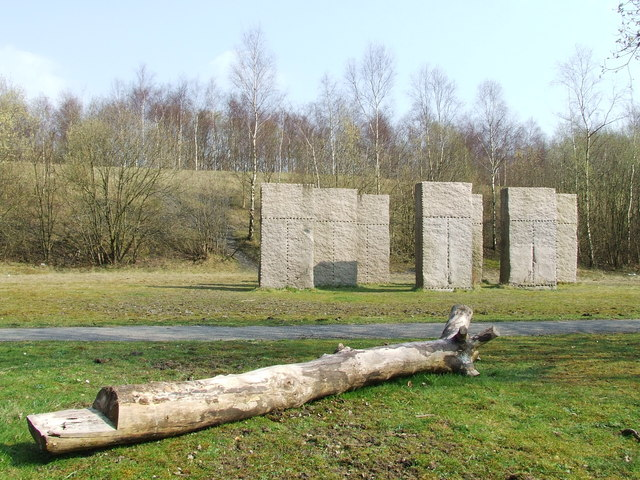
7 Steles (1999). Irwell Sculpture Trail, England

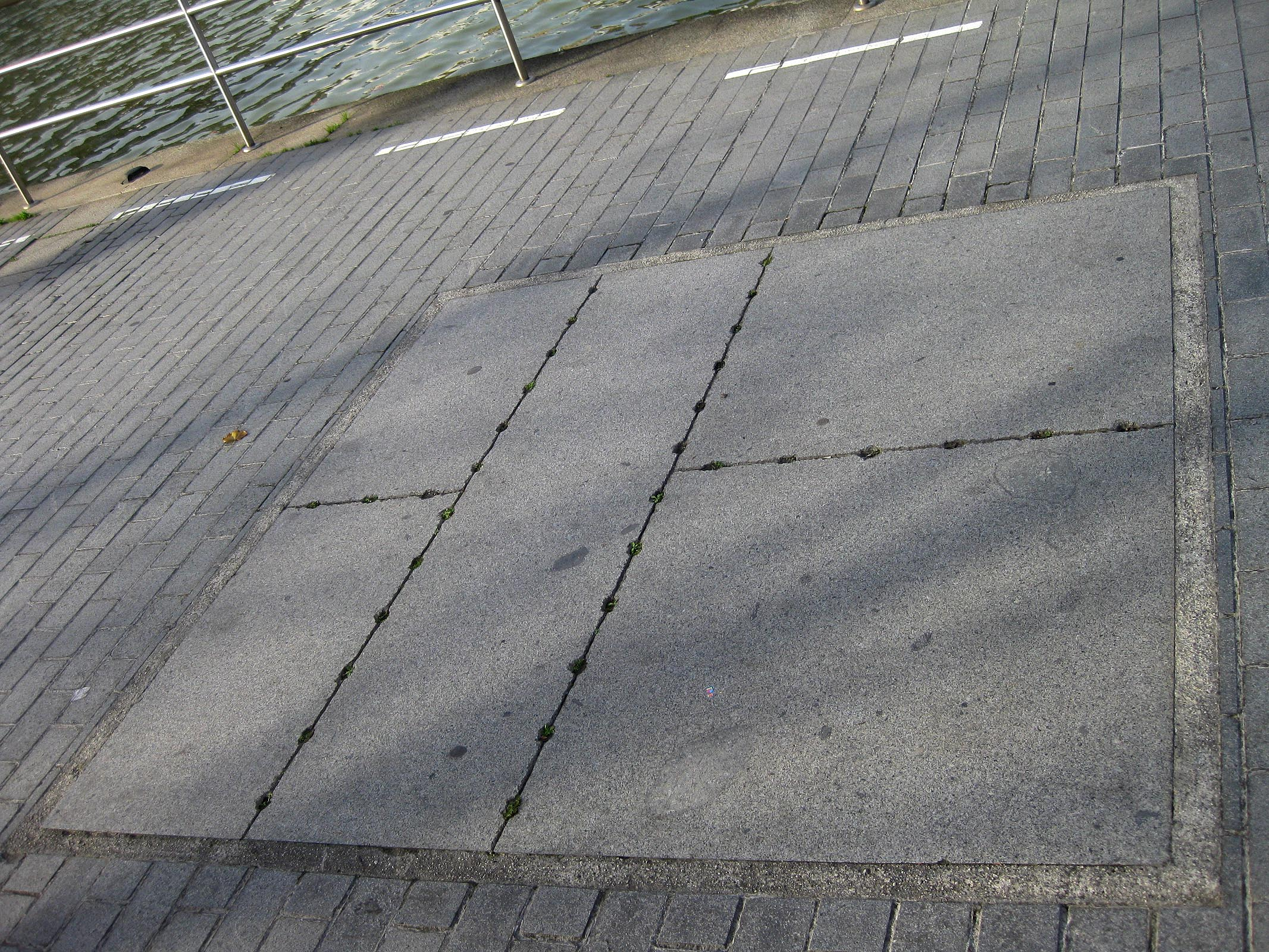
Untitled (2003). Muelle de Evaristo Ghurruca, Bilbao

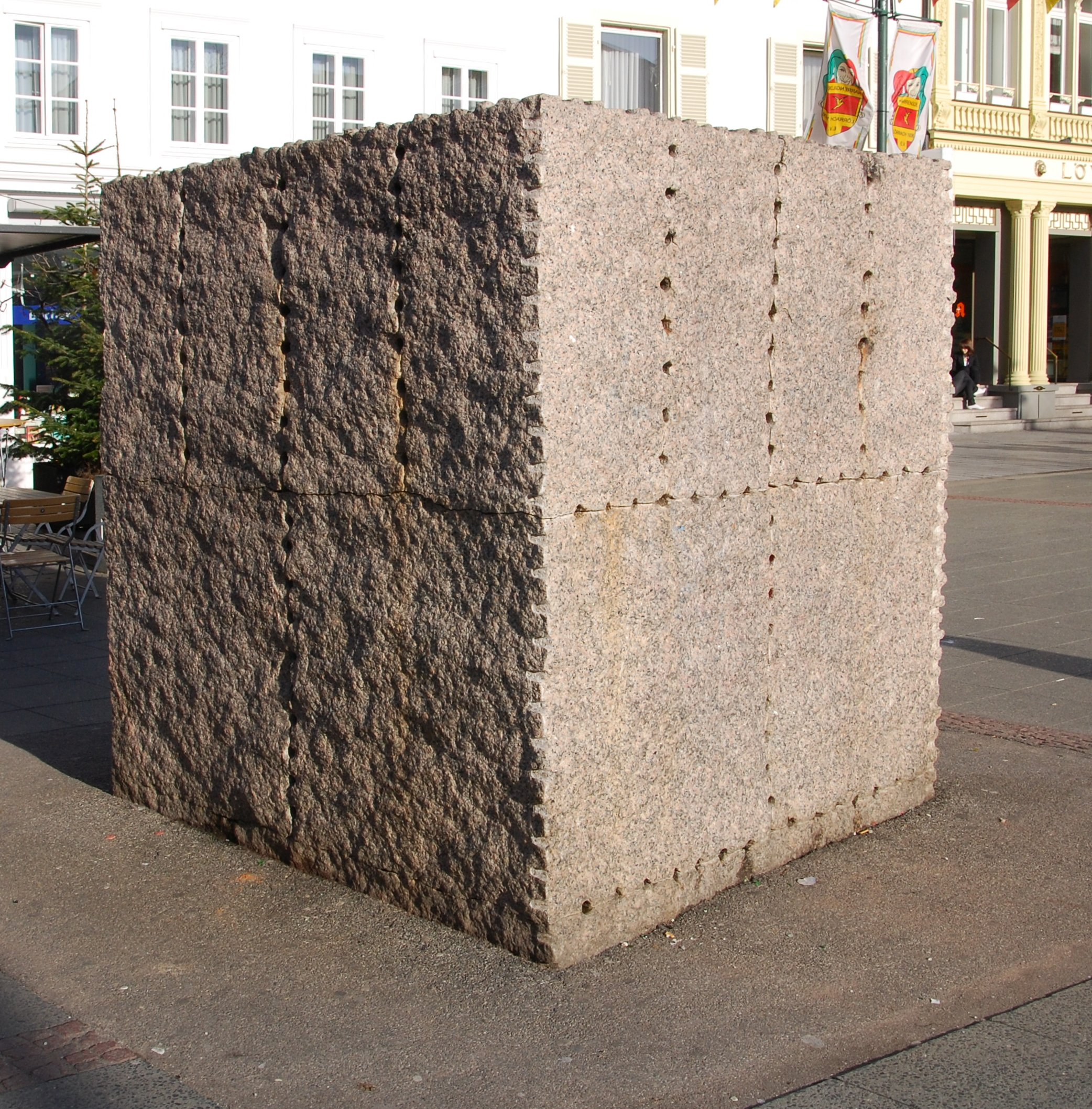
Granite statue in Loerrach

== See also ==
- Untitled (Rückriem) (1987), Chicago
- Untitled (1989), Rückriem, Western Washington University Public Sculpture Collection, Bellingham, Washington
- Untitled (1982) Ruckriem, Fattoria di Celle- Collezione Gori, Pistoia, Italy

== Bibliography ==
- Ulrich Rückriem: Arbeiten, Editor: Heinrich Erhardt, Oktagon, 1994. ISBN 3-927-78933-X (in German)
- Jürgen Hohmeyer: Ulrich Rückriem, Verlag Silke Schreiber, 1988. ISBN 3-88960-013-1 (in German)
