= Tüllingen =

- Stadtteil of Lörrach
- Interactive map of Tüllingen
- Location within Germany Location within Baden-Württemberg
- Coordinates: 47°36′N 7°39′E
- Country: Germany
- State: Baden-Württemberg
- Admin. region: Freiburg
- District: Lörrach
- Town: Lörrach

Area
  - Total: 2.08 km^{2} (0.80 sq mi)
- Elevation: 350–460 m (1,150–1,510 ft)

Population (2009)
  - Total: 1,430
  - Density: 688/km^{2} (1,780/sq mi)
- Time zone: UTC+01:00 (CET)
  - Summer (DST): UTC+02:00 (CEST)
- Postal codes: 79539
- Dialling codes: (+49) 07621
- Vehicle registration: LÖ
- Website: www.loerrach.de

Tüllingen (Alemannic: Düllige) is a part (Stadtteil ) of Lörrach, Baden-Württemberg, Germany. It is located on Tüllinger Mountain, which is also known as Tüllinger Hill or simply the Tüllinger. Upper and Lower Tüllingen were merged into the Tüllingen district in 1935.

== Geography ==
=== Location ===
Tüllingen is a small village in the southwestern region of Germany in Baden-Württemberg. Its coordinates are: Latitude 47°36'07.6"N (47.6021100°), Longitude 7°38'39.3"E (7.6442500°). The Tüllinger Mountain (in Switzerland called Tüllinger Hill) is of geological importance, elevated above the southern part of the city to a height of 460.2 m above sea level (NHN). It offers a view of the tri-border area as well as the so-called "Rhine-Knee" and surrounding cities like Lörrach, Weil am Rhein and Basel

Today, large areas of the Tüllinger have been declared a special area of conservation in order to preserve a space for local recreation. Subsequently, the mountain has been designated as a protected area by the Habitats Directive. Due to the region's mild climate, the southwestern slope of the mountain is optimal for growing grapes, which are popular for regional products such as Markgräfler Wine. As well, the exposed position of the mountain allows many weather stations to measure data for the weather forecasting. A small part of the Tüllinger above the former public swimming pool in Riehen, Im Schlipf, is in Swiss territory.

=== Neighbouring communities ===
In the south, Tüllingen shares a border with another village named Riehen, which is located on the Swiss border. The district of Stetten is located southeast of Tüllingen. Further north is the center of Lörrach. North of Tüllingen lies Tumringen, as well as Ötlingen and Haltingen, which are districts of Weil am Rhein. Situated to the southwest of Tüllingen is Alt-Weil (Old-Weil), which is located on the hillside.

=== Geology and agriculture ===
Tüllinger Mountain is situated predominantly in the Tüllinger softwater molasse. The molasse comprises vryenen marl and parts of the Alsace molasse. The mountain was created through a fracture zone. The soil on Tüllinger Mountain comprises loess, clay-saboulous, and chalky soils, which allows for the cultivation of grapes and other fruit. Closed vine-areas are located in the south between Baselweg, Lichsenweg, and the lower Wagenkehrweg in the direction of Alt-Weil.

== History ==
The first documented mention of Tüllingen dates back to the year 1113 when Walcho von Waldeck donated his possessions to the St. Blaise Abbey, indicating that the settlement's name possibly derived from a personal name. In 1173, the village is mentioned in a writ of protection addressed to St. Blasien by the then Pope Callixtus III, in which the Tüllinger Churches' possessions are named. The village has developed into becoming the road to Rötteln.

Tüllingen, among other villages, was affected by the Thirty Years War and the destruction of Rötteln in 1679 by French troops. On October 14, 1702, the Battle at Käferholz resulted in heavy damage to the village. In 1767 the public water supply came from a new source, discovered between Higher- and Lower-Tüllingen. The same year, the borders to Rötteln were confirmed. In the 17th and 18th century, disputes of allegiance occurred between Tüllingen and neighbouring communities.

Tüllingen officially became a district of Lörrach on October 1, 1935.

== Public buildings ==
The children's home Kinderheim Tüllingerhöhe can be found in Higher Tüllingen. The Protestant church is responsible for the home. The children's home consists of an administration block, a canteen kitchen, a basic primary school, a secondary modern school, a special school and a junior high school that goes up to the seventh grade. There are eight living groups, therapy facilities, a gym and a sports field as well. Two of the living groups belonging to the children's home are located in Lower Tüllingen. The old St.Ottilien Church in Higher Tüllingen is illuminated and visible from a great distance in the evening. The Lörrach Channel is also located in Higher Tüllingen.

== Emblem ==
The Emblem of Tüllingen consists of two crossed golden swords on a blue background. It was introduced in 1901 to commemorate the Battle of Friedlingen which took place on October 14, 1702.

== Infrastructure ==
Lörrach and Weil am Rhein are separated by the Tüllinger Mountain, a winding road leading over the Tüllinger Mountain, and a railroad tunnel, built between 1888 and 1890. For decades, the communities had tried to reach an agreement on a tunnel that goes through Swiss territory in order to bypass the road over the Tüllinger Mountain. In October 2013, the "Zollfreie" (literally: "toll-free") was opened.

== Well-known inhabitants ==
- Adolf Glattacker (1878–1971), German Painter and graphic artist.

== Literature ==
- Stadt Lörrach (Hrsg.): Unser Lörrach 1972, eine Grenzstadt im Spiegel der Zeit. Kropf und Herz Verlag, Lörrach 1973.

In diesem Jahrbuch sind mehrere Artikel dem Stadtteil Tüllingen gewidmet, darunter:
- Gerhard Moehring: Durch 300 Jahre im Tüllinger Kirchenbuch geblättert. S. 16–25.
- Gerhard Moehring: Die Pfarrherren von Tüllingen seit der Reformation. S. 26–28.
- Albert Vögtlin: Die alten Tüllinger Familien. S. 37–44.
- Inge Gula: Flurnamen der alten Gemarkung Tüllingen. S. 62–104.

- Landesarchivdirektion Baden-Württemberg, Landkreis Lörrach (Hrsg.): Der Landkreis Lörrach, Band II (Kandern bis Zell im Wiesental), Jan Thorbecke Verlag Sigmaringen 1994, ISBN 3-7995-1354-X, S. 160–162.
