= Ötlingen (Weil am Rhein) =

District of Weil am Rhein, Baden-Württemberg, Germany

- Ortschaft of Weil am Rhein
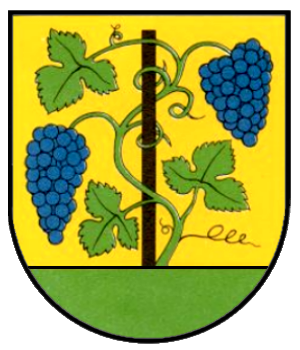
- Coat of arms

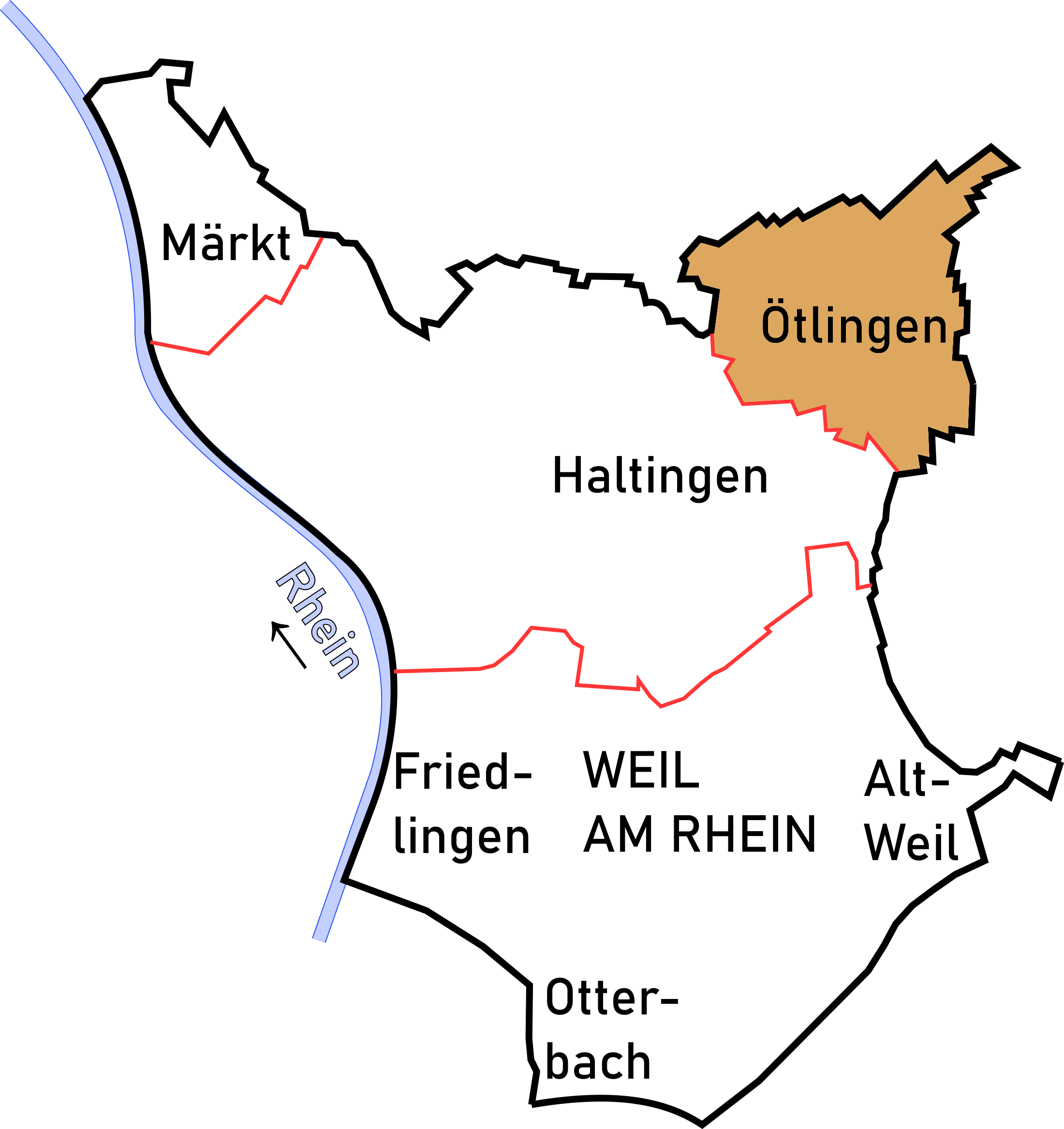
- Location of Ötlingen in Weil am Rhein
- Interactive map of Ötlingen
- Location within Germany Location within Baden-Württemberg
- Coordinates: 47°37′20″N 7°37′30″E
- Country: Germany
- State: Baden-Württemberg
- Admin. region: Freiburg
- District: Lörrach
- Town: Weil am Rhein

Area
  - Total: 2.19 km^{2} (0.85 sq mi)

Population (2019)
  - Total: 739
  - Density: 337/km^{2} (874/sq mi)
- Time zone: UTC+01:00 (CET)
  - Summer (DST): UTC+02:00 (CEST)

Ötlingen (Alemannic: Ötlige) is a Stadtteil and Ortschaft of Weil am Rhein, Baden-Württemberg, Germany. It is located on the northwestern foothills of the Tüllinger Berg. Once an independent community, this area was incorporated into Weil am Rhein in 1971.

== Location ==
Ötlingen is positioned on the northwestern ridge of the Tüllinger Berg, situated to the northeast of Haltingen and to the south of Binzen and the Kandertal. The settlement in the comparatively small parish extends along the Dorfstraße. Adjacent to the northern side of Dorfstraße is a newly developed area that extends from the village center. The Luisenhof, situated to the east of the village center along the district road, also falls within the Ötlingen district. A vast wine-growing region lies to the southwest. In the southern direction, the view encompasses the Germany-France-Switzerland border triangle, the Basel Rhine bend, and a substantial portion of the Basel Bay alongside the adjoining upper Alsace region.

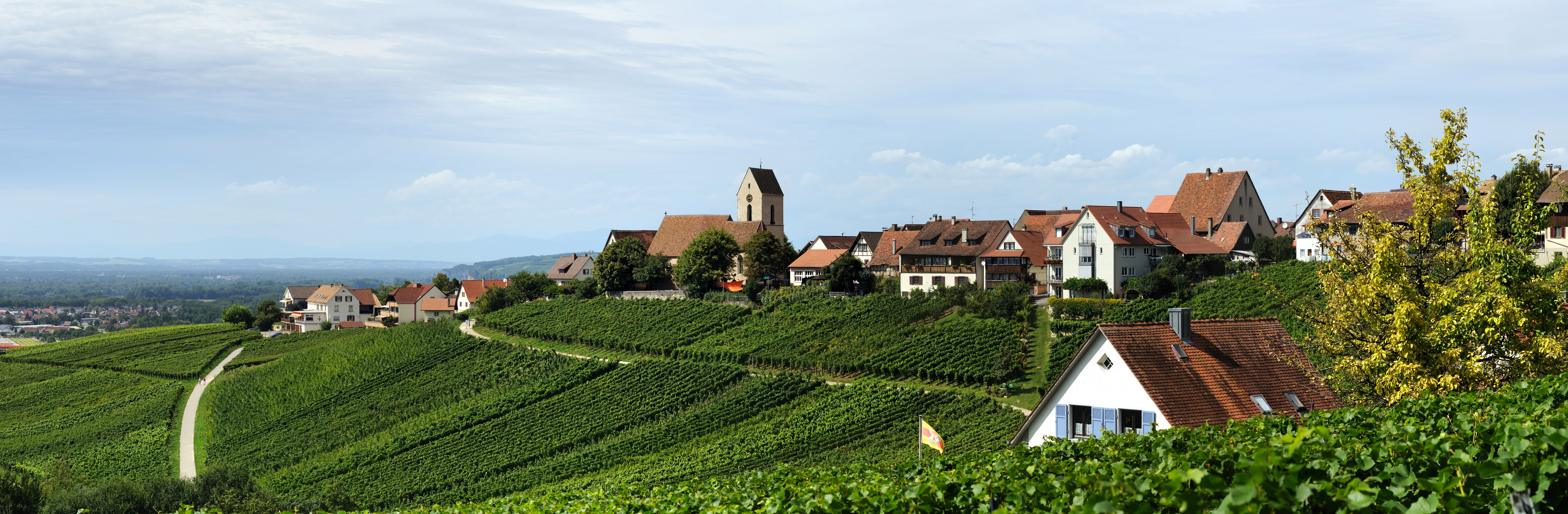
Ötlingen: View from Tüllinger Berg

== Geology ==
The Ötlinger Berg is featured in the depiction of the Markgräfler Tertiary hill landscape as a northwestern extension of the Tüllinger Berg. However, from the geological point of view, it is an independent plateau, which consists of other layers than those of the Tüllinger Berg. Its bedrock is formed by freshwater marls and limestones, which were once deposited in a lake basin of the Upper Rhine Graben (28 to 20 million years ago). The Ötlinger Berg, on the other hand, is built up of older sediments. (Age: 34 to 28 million years.) At its southwestern foot, dark gray Rupel clays of the Froidefontaine Formation were encountered. They form the base of the mountain to some extent. Above this, fine sandstones, and marls of the Alsace molasse (Chatt) are about 50 m thick. In the area of the village and on the northern slope, however, these are covered by a loess or loess-loam blanket.

The mentioned strata were laid down during the Oligocene epoch within the subsiding Rhine Graben. The clays constituting the Froidefontaine Formation were sedimented during a period when the sea temporarily advanced into the trench. Subsequently, the Alsace Molasse was formed as the trench reverted to a landlocked state. Consequently, these deposits represent a transition from brackish to freshwater conditions (visible in outcrop at Fischingen/Läufelberg!). Later still, the lacustrine Tüllinger Berg strata formed under continental circumstances.

Moving east from the village, the Alsace Molasse suddenly meets the much younger Tüllinger strata. This is due to a north-south fault that uplifts the Ötlinger-Berg-Scholle above the Tüllingerberg. However, erosion has mitigated and even reversed this elevation difference. The fault, which acts as a geological boundary between Ötlinger Berg and Tüllinger Berg and originates from Binzen, passes through the upper village. As a result, the highest houses and the cemetery are now situated on the Tüllingerberg slope.

The steep slope on the western extremity of the Ötlinger Berg can be attributed to the erosive force of the Rhine River. During the penultimate glacial period (Risskaltzeit), the Rhine flowed around the lower Bühl slope and deposited gravel layers reaching heights of up to 300 meters in this area (high terrace gravel).

== History ==
The earliest documented reference to the settlement of Ottlinchoven dates back to 1064, as recorded in the plague archives of Vienna. Based on the analysis of the name, it is inferred that the settlement was established not during the earliest settlement phase, but rather during an expansion stage in the Merovingian period. Archaeological discoveries provide evidence that the history of the local church traces back to the 8th century.

During the 12th century, the territory of the Lords of Rötteln extended to include the wine village of Ötlingen. Lütold III von Rötteln, who was a vassal of the Bishop of Basel, bequeathed all rights and possessions to the cathedral provost of Basel. The dominion was taken over by the margraves of Hachberg-Sausenberg in 1306. Nevertheless, the bishops of Basel retained their lordship over the estate. This ownership lasted until 1503 when the village came under the jurisdiction of the Margraves of Baden. Following their division in 1535, it fell within the realm of the Margraves of Baden-Durlach.

On October 14, 1702, Margrave Ludwig Wilhelm of Baden-Baden, also known as "Türkenlouis," directed the battle of Friedlingen from the Ötlingen parsonage. This was because the majority of the infantry had ascended the Tüllinger Berg through the village.

In 1809, Ötlingen transitioned from the Oberamt Rötteln to become part of the Baden district of Lörrach. On December 1, 1971, Ötlingen was incorporated into the town of Weil am Rhein.

== Population ==
The population of Ötlingen developed as follows:

Population development of Ötlingen

Year	Population
1852	481
1871	532
1880	510
1890	492
1900	456
1910	406
1925	413

Year	Population
1933	394
1939	402
1950	494
1956	531
1960	545
1970	546
2015	742

== Politics ==
=== Village Council ===
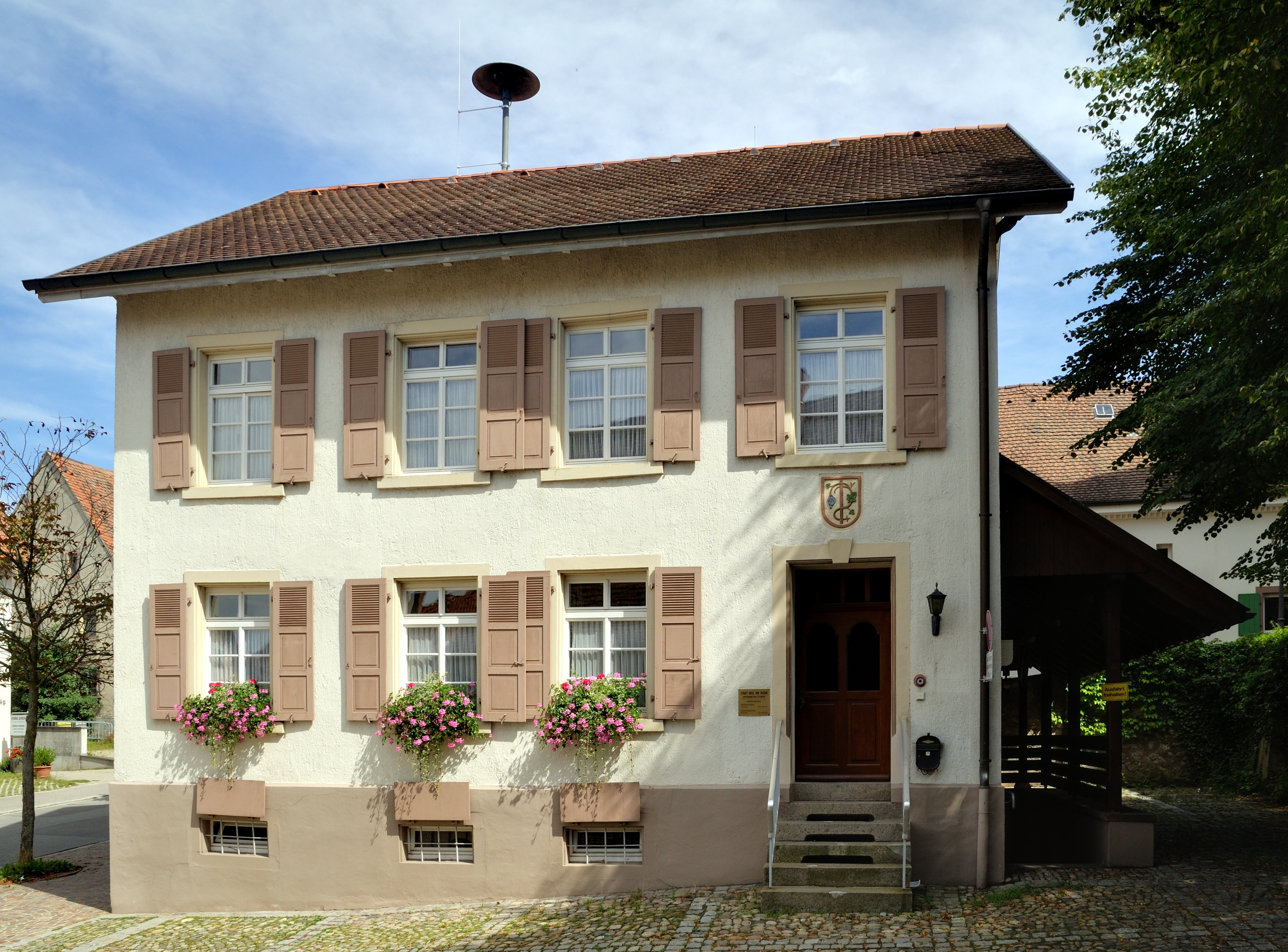
City hall

An additional agreement to the incorporation contract of 1971 ensured Ötlingen its own local constitution and a local council, which holds significant decision-making powers within the village. The seat of the council is the Ötlingen town hall. The local council comprises representatives from the Unabhängigen Wählergemeinschaft (UWG) (Independent Voters' Association) and the group Perspektive auf Dau(e)r. The head of the village since 2009 is Helene Brombacher, who represents the UWG.

=== Coat of arms ===
Blazon: "In gold on a green shield base on a black cane a green vine with on both sides a blue grape and on the right two, on the left one leaf."

The vine symbolizes the significant role of viticulture in the village. The coat of arms was designed by the General State Archives according to the wishes of the community and has been in use since 1902. The seal of the village has featured the grape with leaves since around 1840. In Leutrum's manuscript from 1747, a star was mentioned as Ötlingen's coat of arms."

== Culture, sights, and infrastructure ==
=== Site and buildings ===
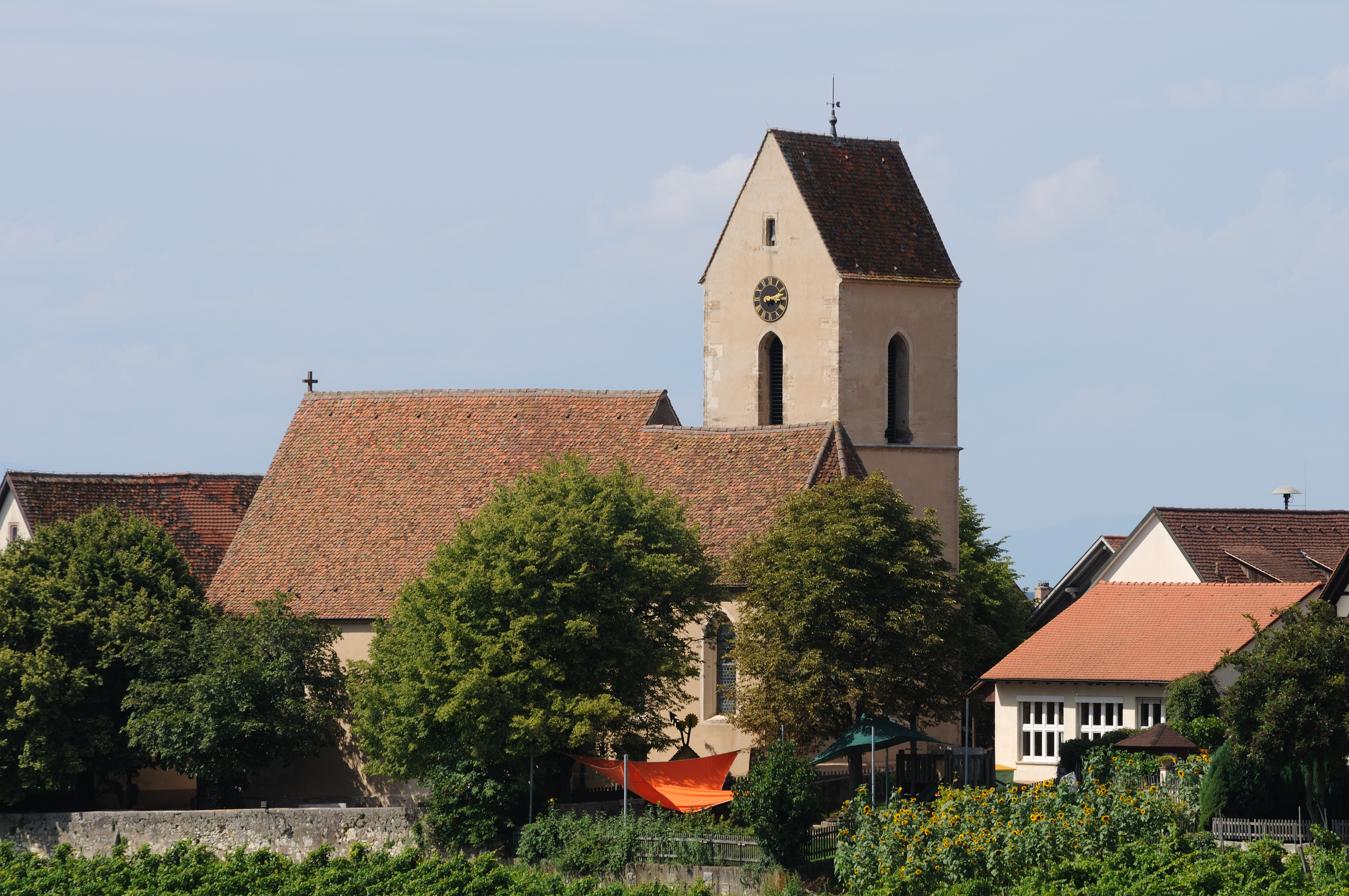
Gallus Church

Many houses in the village center date back to the 16th and 17th centuries, constituting a significant portion of the architecture. The entire townscape of Ötlingen holds the status of a protected historic monument. The oldest surviving house in the village is the Kogerhaus, a half-timbered structure built in 1571. Notable among the historical houses are the Ottmarsheimer Hof from 1594 and the Haus Gerwig from 1716.

Situated in the lower part of the village center is the Lutheran St. Gallus Church. The origins of the church can be traced back to around the year 800, as evidenced by archaeological excavations, and it was officially documented in a historical record in 1275. Originally a rectangular hall church, it underwent expansions to the east and north during the 13th century. Elements from this period, including the bell tower and parts of the north wall of the nave featuring frescoes from the late Middle Ages, have been preserved. The church's current Gothic appearance is the result of extensive renovations undertaken between 1410 and 1420, commissioned by Margrave Rudolf III of Hachberg-Sausenberg."

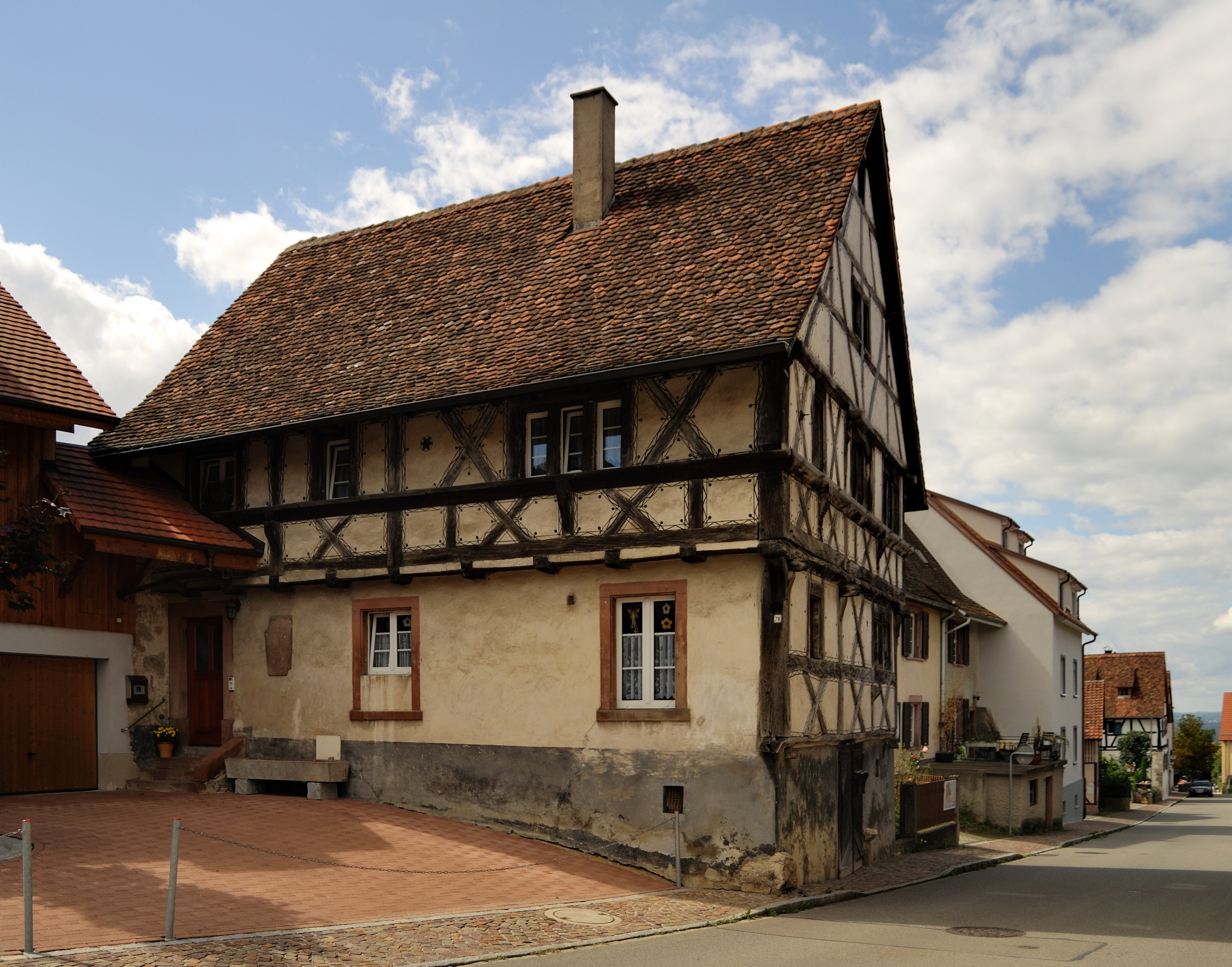
Half-timbered house in Ötlingen

Adjacent to the church is the rectory, which dates back to 1410. Behind the church, one can find the tomb of the artist Hermann Daur, who died in Ötlingen in 1925.

The Weiler Weinweg (Wine Trail), spanning approximately four kilometers, leads through the village and across the western slopes of the vineyard area on the Tüllinger Berg. Educational panels along the path offer insights into the vines and the evolution of viticulture in the region.

Dating back to 1536, the Gretherhaus is a half-timbered house complemented by an adjoining forge. Since 1990, it has been home to the Dorfstube Ötlingen, a small open-air museum. This museum presents a glimpse into a typical rural dwelling from the 19th century. The museum welcomes visitors seasonally on Sundays.

=== Education ===
In Ötlingen there is a municipal kindergarten and the Hermann Daur Elementary School.

=== Traffic ===
Ötlingen is accessible from the west via a country road originating in Haltingen, as well as from the northeast in the direction of Rümmingen. Located just under two kilometers to the northeast, a connecting road diverges from this country road leading over the Lucke Pass towards Tumringen. This junction is also home to the intersection (4) Kandern of the Federal Highway 98 (A 98).

A segment of the Jakobsweg (Way of St. James) traverses the village street from Binzen along the Tüllinger Berg, extending further to Weil am Rhein and eventually into Switzerland. Additionally, the Markgräfler Wiiwegli intersects through the village center. The Markgräfler Radweg, a 74-kilometer-long cycling path that stretches from Freiburg im Breisgau to Alt-Weil, passes through Ötlingen. This cycle path is distinguished by a green sign displaying the inscription Mg.
