= Beyeler Foundation =

Fondation Beyeler
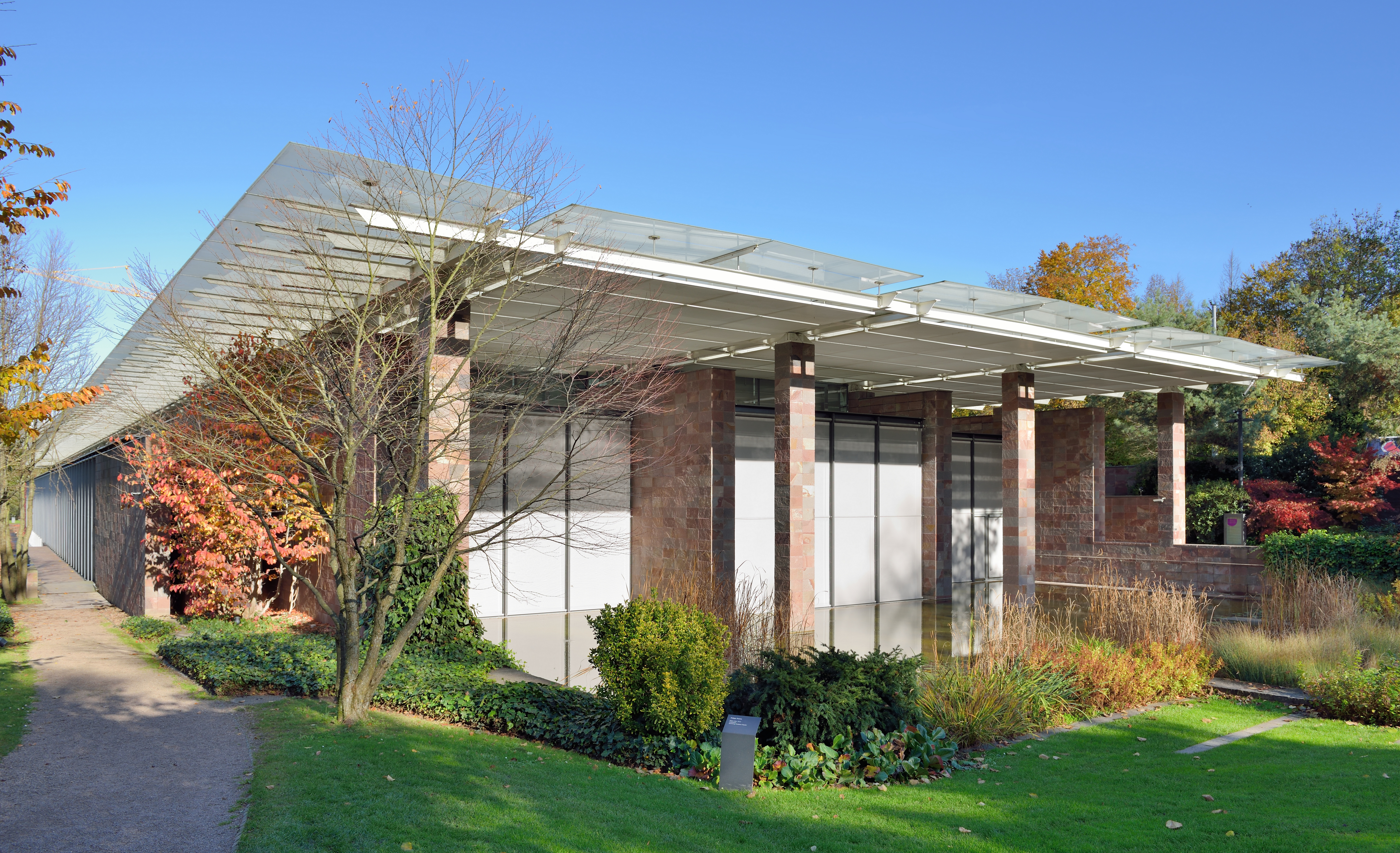
- Beyeler Foundation in Riehen, Switzerland
- Interactive fullscreen map
- Established: 1982
- Location: Riehen, Switzerland
- Coordinates: 47°35′17″N 7°39′04″E
- Type: Art museum
- Visitors: c. 332,000 (2016)
- Director: Sam Keller
- Curators: Theodora Vischer; Ulf Küster; Raphaël Bouvier; Michiko Kono
- Website: www.fondationbeyeler.ch

The Beyeler Foundation or Fondation Beyeler, with its museum in Riehen, near Basel (Switzerland), owns and oversees the art collection of Hildy and Ernst Beyeler, which features modern and traditional art. The Beyeler Foundation museum includes a space for special exhibitions staged to complement the permanent collection, which is not on public display. In 2006, approximately 340,000 persons visited the museum. In 2016, the number of visitors was 332,000, and it was the most visited art museum in Switzerland. The museum is properly funded, and it receives annual grants from the cantons of Basel City and Basel County and the commune of Riehen. Major partners of the Foundation are Bayer AG, Novartis and Swiss bank UBS.

== History ==
Art dealers Ernst Beyeler (16 July 1921 – 25 February 2010) and Hilda Kunz (1922 – 18 July 2008), known as Hildy, created the Beyeler Foundation in 1982 and commissioned Renzo Piano to design a museum to house their private collection. The collection was first publicly exhibited in its entirety at the Centro de Arte Reina Sofía in Madrid in 1989, and was subsequently shown at Neue Nationalgalerie in Berlin in 1993 and the Art Gallery of New South Wales in Sydney in 1997. In September 1994 the groundbreaking of the museum took place. The inauguration was scheduled for 1996, but postponed until 1997 due to delays in the construction. In October 1997, the Beyeler Foundation made its collection accessible to the public.

== Collection and exhibitions ==
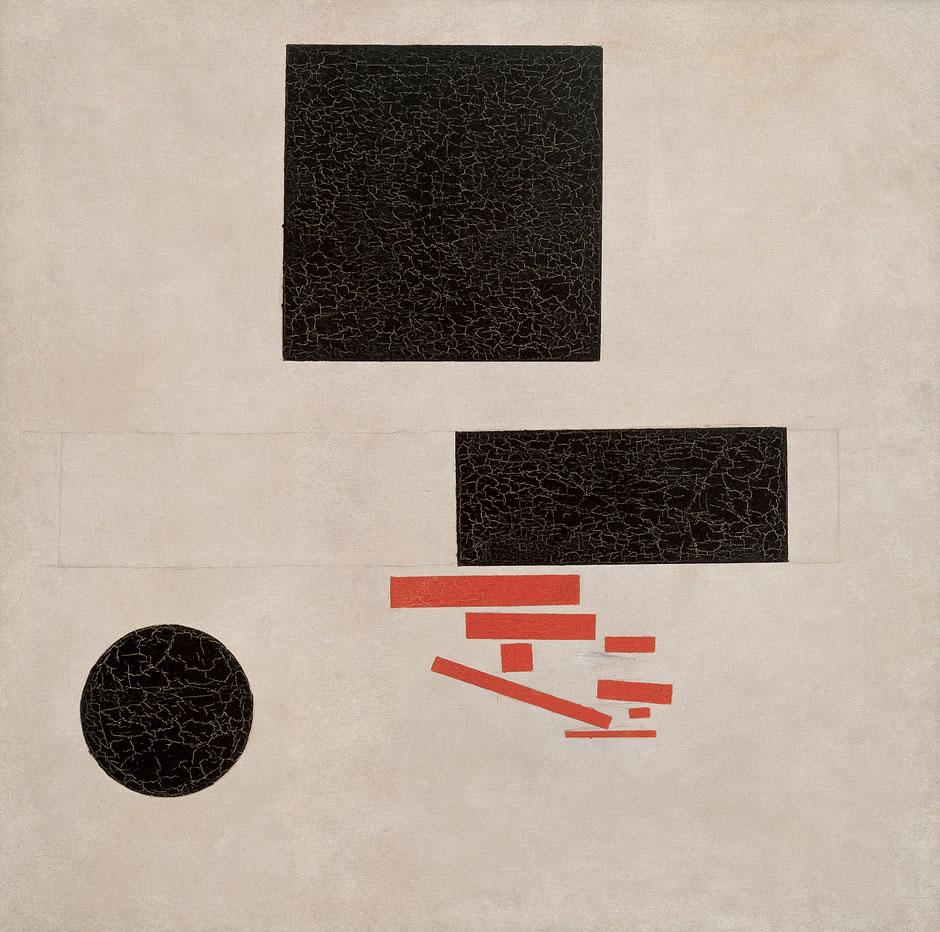
Suprematist Composition (1915), oil on canvas, by Kazimir Malevich

The Beyeler Foundation opened its doors on 18 October 1997, presenting 140 works of modern classics, including 23 Picassos. The overall collection of 400 works of classic modernism reflect the views of Hildy and Ernst Beyeler on 20th-century art and highlight features typical of the period from Claude Monet, Paul Cézanne and Vincent van Gogh to Pablo Picasso, Andy Warhol, Roy Lichtenstein and Francis Bacon. The paintings appear alongside some 25 objects of tribal art from Africa, Oceania and Alaska. A third of the exhibition space is reserved for special exhibitions staged to complement the permanent collection.

The culmination of Beyeler's career came in 2007 when all the works that passed through his hands were reunited at the museum for a grand exhibition that included van Gogh's 1889 Portrait of Postman Roulin, Lichtenstein's Plus and Minus III and a huge expressive drip painting by Jackson Pollock. The collection is expanding, particularly in terms of works made after 1950 (recent acquisitions include pieces by Louise Bourgeois, Wolfgang Tillmans, and Gerhard Richter). In 2013, French art collector Micheline Renard donated several artworks to the museum, including by Jean Dubuffet, Jean-Michel Basquiat, Sam Francis, and Sigmar Polke; the trove was first exhibited at the museum in 2014.

The garden surrounding the museum also periodically serves as a venue for special exhibitions. In a work called "Wrapped Trees", Christo and Jeanne-Claude veiled 178 trees in the park around the Beyeler Foundation and in the adjacent Berower Park between 13 November and 14 December 1998.

== Selected collection highlights ==
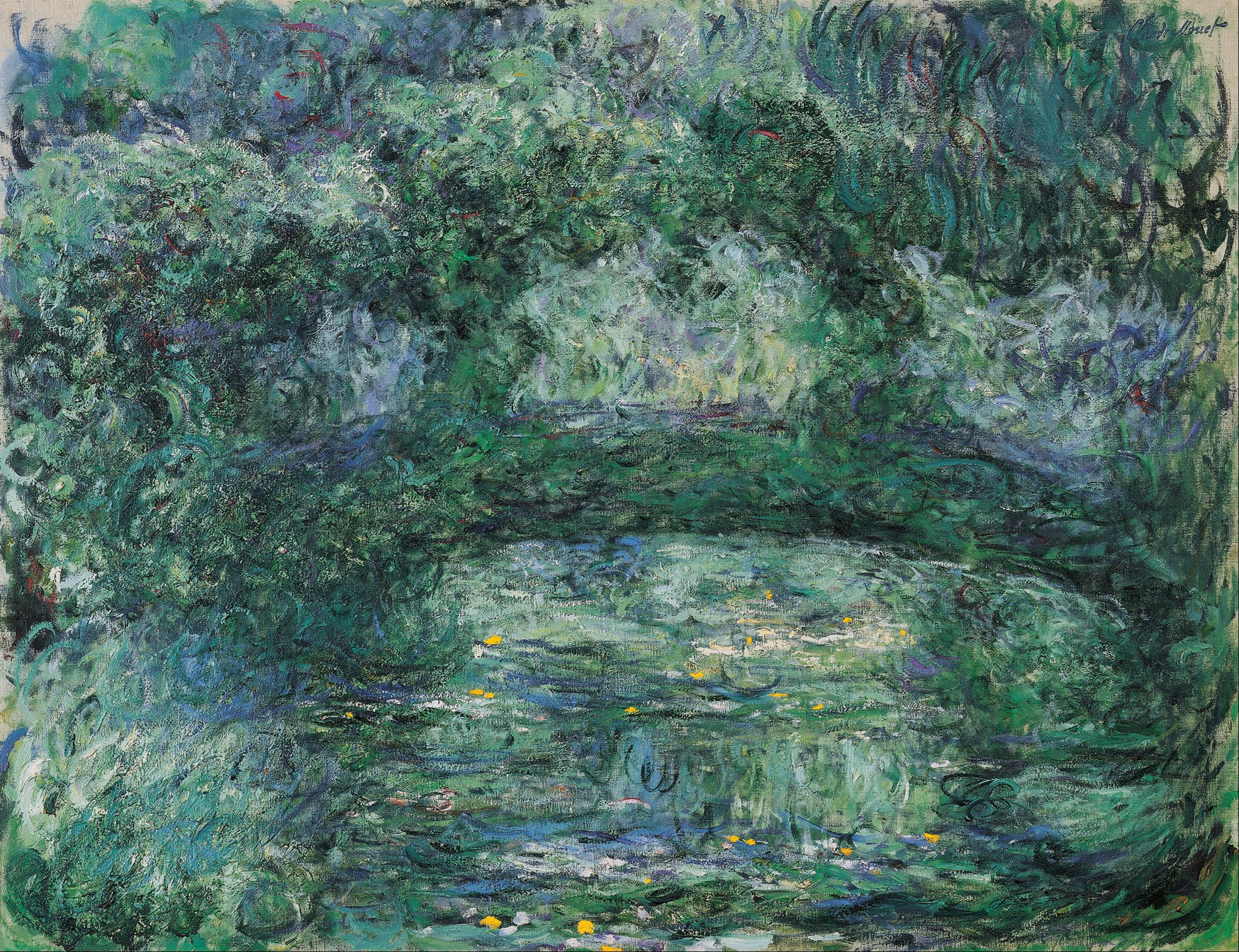
Claude Monet

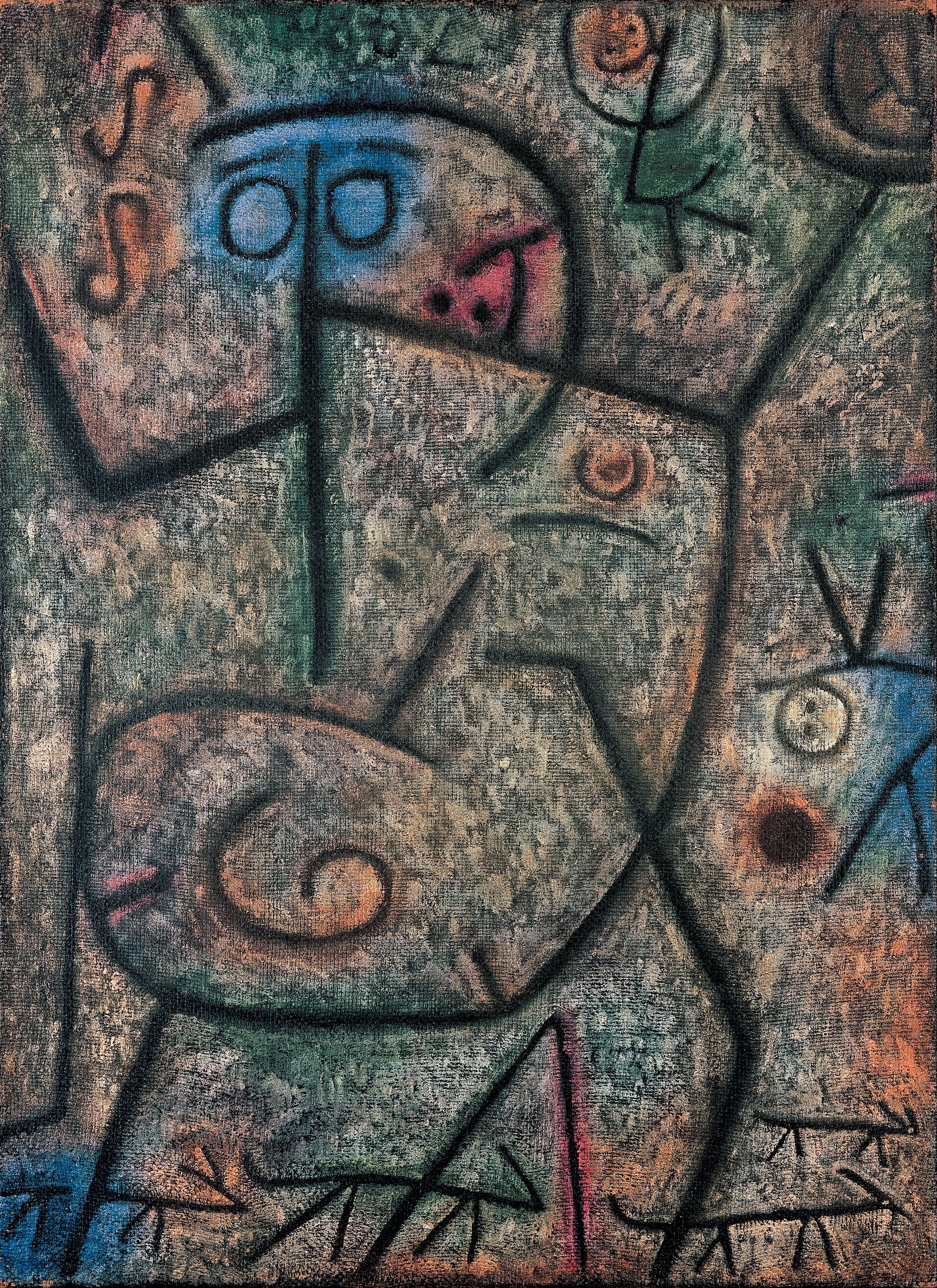
Paul Klee

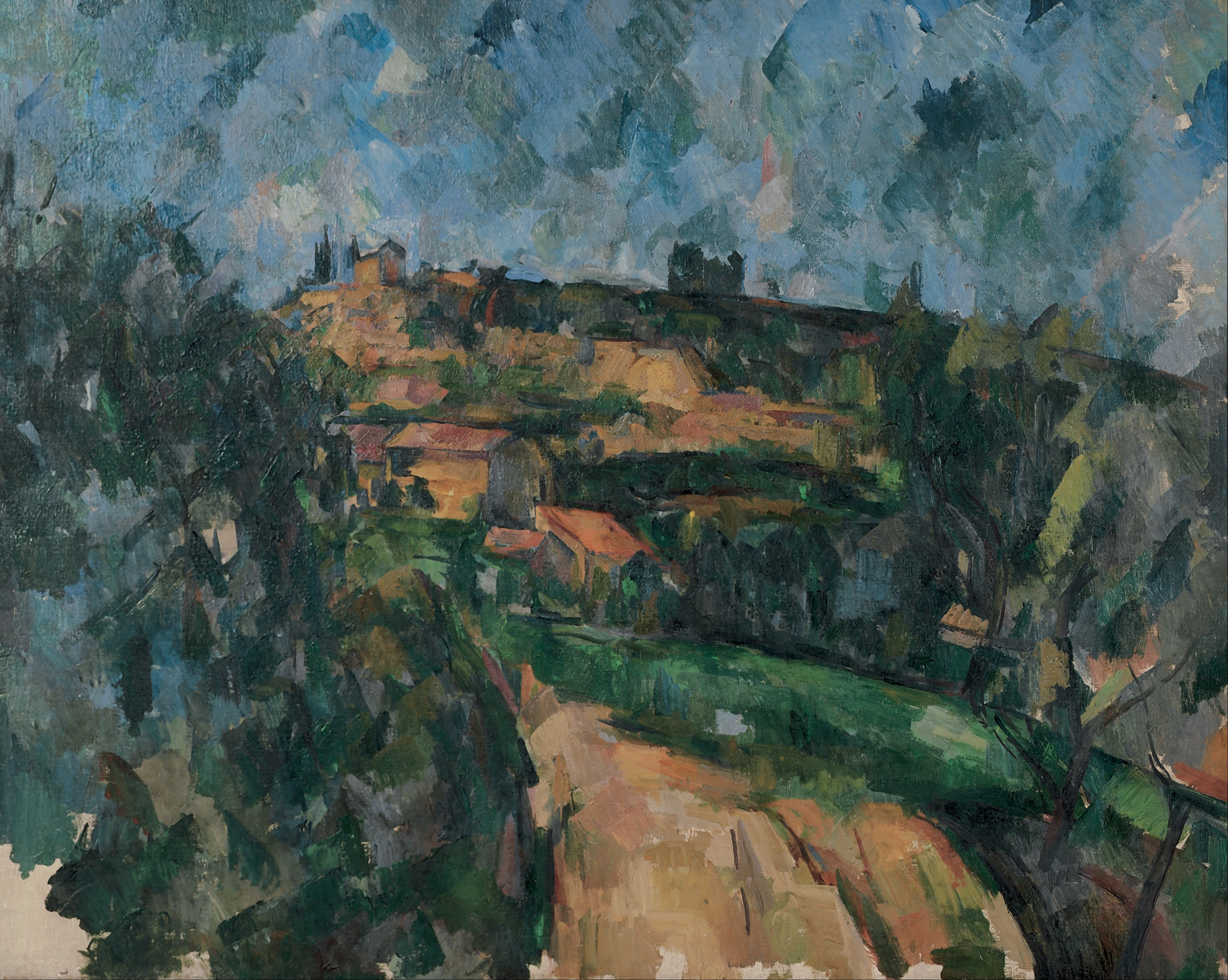
Paul Cézanne

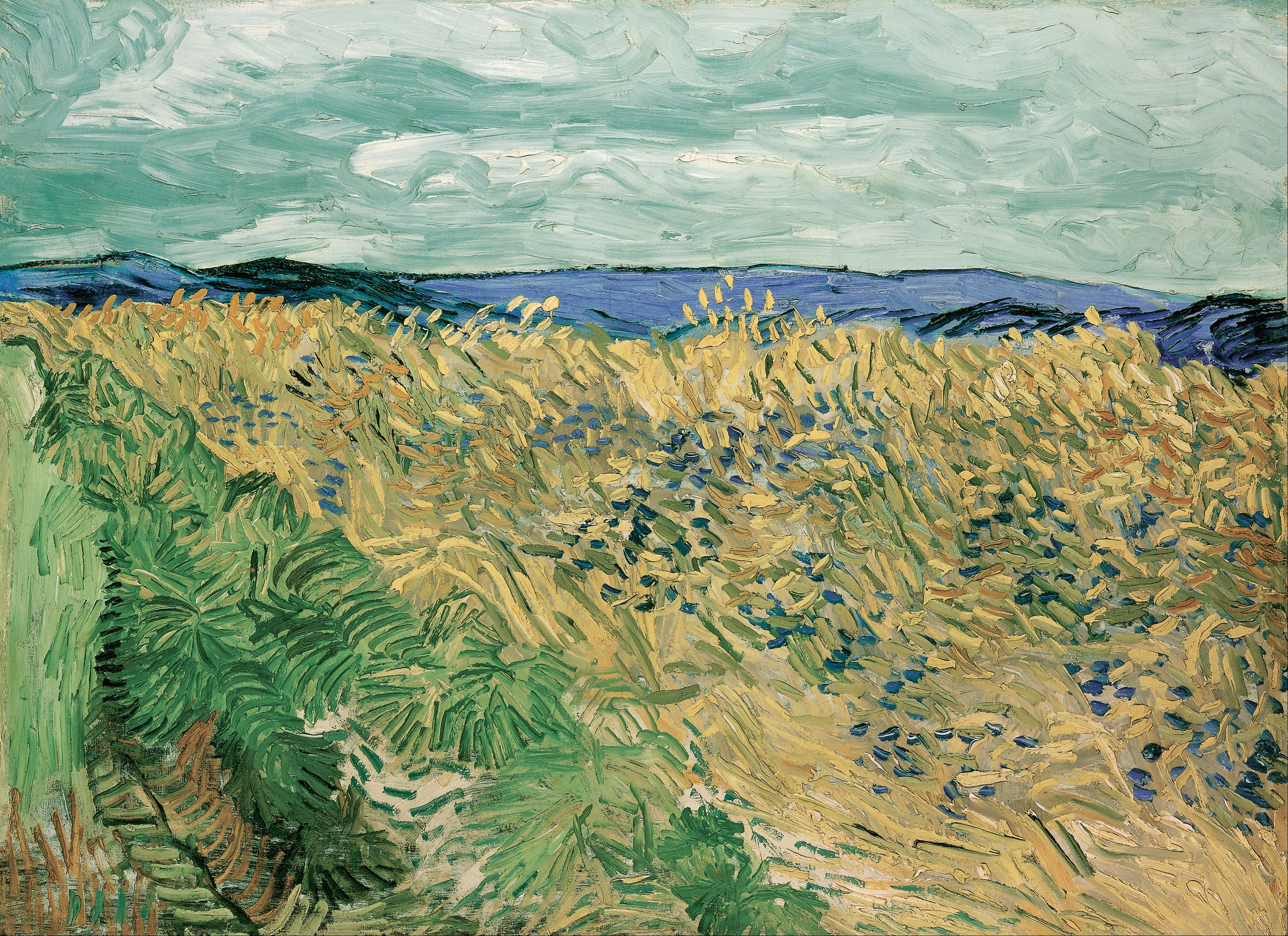
Vincent Van Gogh

== Architecture ==
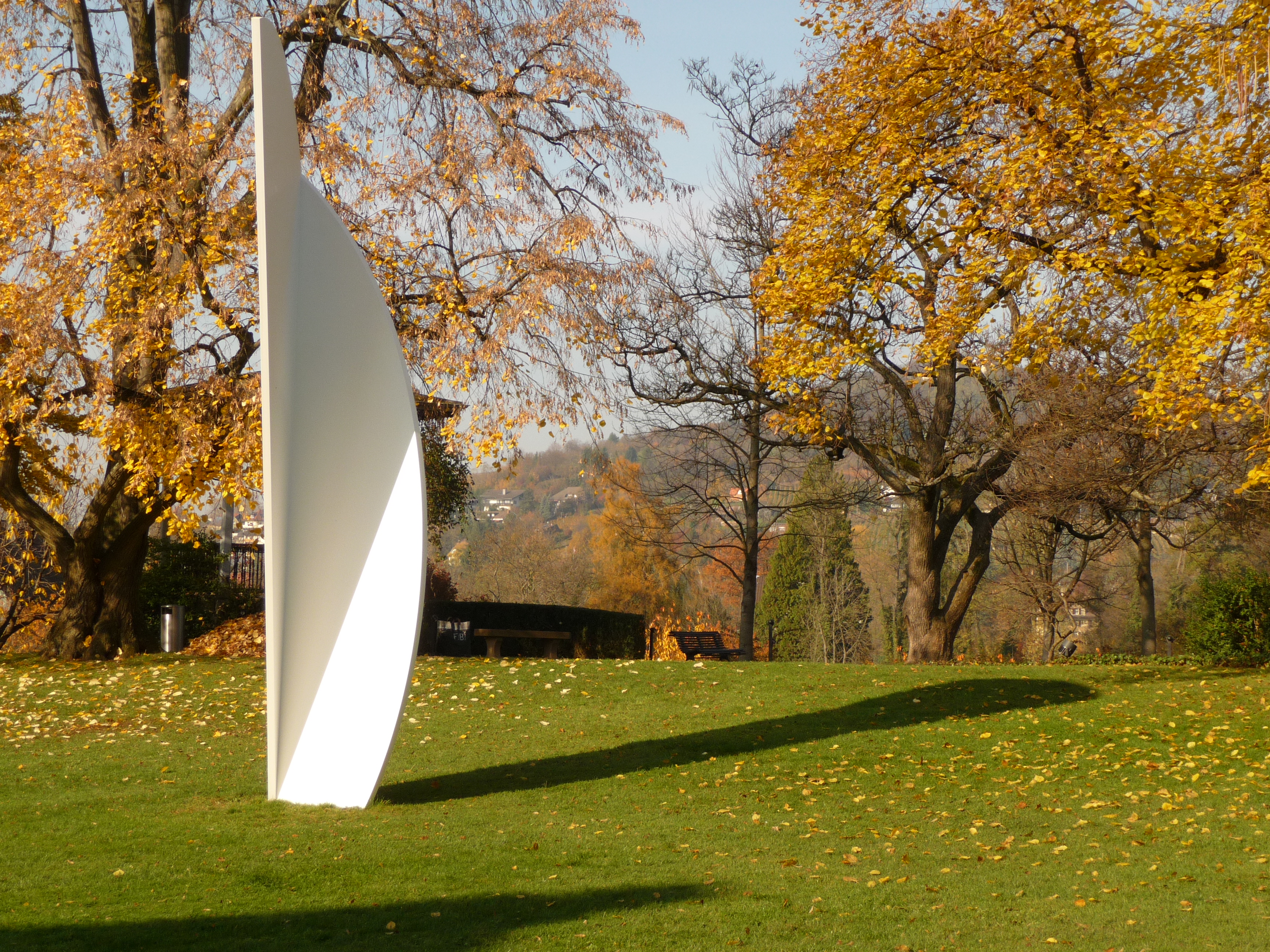
White Curves (2002), made of white aluminium, by Ellsworth Kelly

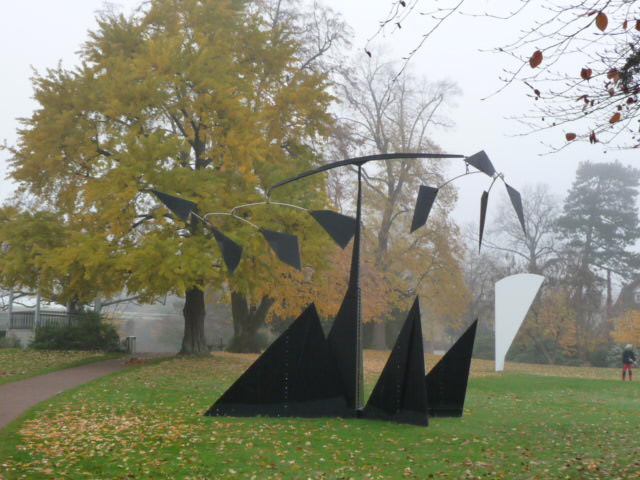
Sculptures by Alexander Calder (front) and Ellsworth Kelly in the park

According to a design of the Italian architect Renzo Piano the construction of the museum began in September 1994 in the Berower Park in Riehen. The museum was meant to be embedded in the English landscape garden in the park and according to Beyeler, not only be a museum but also a small power plant in which its visitors were to regain strength. The building features a glazed façade largely looking out onto the corn fields and vines covering the Tüllinger Hills. The two perimeter walls of the original garden site inspired the idea of the museum’s layout. A red wall built with porphyry from Patagonia, South America replaced to the original in place before. The four 115-metre (377 ft) long porphyry walls running from north to south and standing 7 metres (23 ft) apart define the plan of the building. Resting on top of the solid foundation walls, the lightweight glass roof, white enamelled on the reverse, admits northern light but screens off light from the east and the west. Along the northern and the southern sides the roof projects far beyond the walls, shading the glass façades from the sun. In 1999, less than two years after the opening of the museum edifice, the building was lengthened by 12 metres (39 ft), which increased total exhibition space by 458 square metres (4,930 sq ft) to its present (as of April 2020) 3,764 square metres (40,520 sq ft).

Situated vis-à-vis the museum building, the late-Baroque Villa Berower houses the museum's administration department and a restaurant.

In 2026, the Fondation Beyeler completed an expansion by architect Peter Zumthor, selected in 2016 from a field of 100 architects, including Sou Fujimoto, Jun'ya Ishigami, Christian Kerez, Hiroshi Nakamura, Smiljan Radić Clarke, SANAA, Eduardo Souto de Moura and Tod Williams Billie Tsien Architects. Costing a reported $144.9 million, the project added three structures: a 16,000-square-foot gallery named for Swiss entrepreneur Hansjörg Wyss; the Ammann Pavilion performance venue named after Swiss art dealers Thomas and Doris Ammann; and the Erlen Torhaus office building. The expansion also included landscape work by Vogt Landschaftsarchitekten; the area of the surrounding park was approximately doubled to just under 5 acres.

== Partners and sponsors ==
=== Public Sponsors ===
- Swiss Confederation
- Municipality of Riehen
- Canton of Basel-City

=== Major Partners ===
- Bayer
- Novartis
- UBS

=== Partners ===
- accurART
- Basler Kantonalbank
- Fondation BNP Paribas
- Rolls-Royce Motor Cars
- ISS Facility Services
- J. Safra Sarasin
- BLKB: Was morgen zählt
- Hatje Cantz
- Richard Mille

== See also ==
- Museums in Basel
