= Tüllinger Berg =

Mountain located in southern Baden-Württemberg

- Tüllinger or Tüllinger Hügel
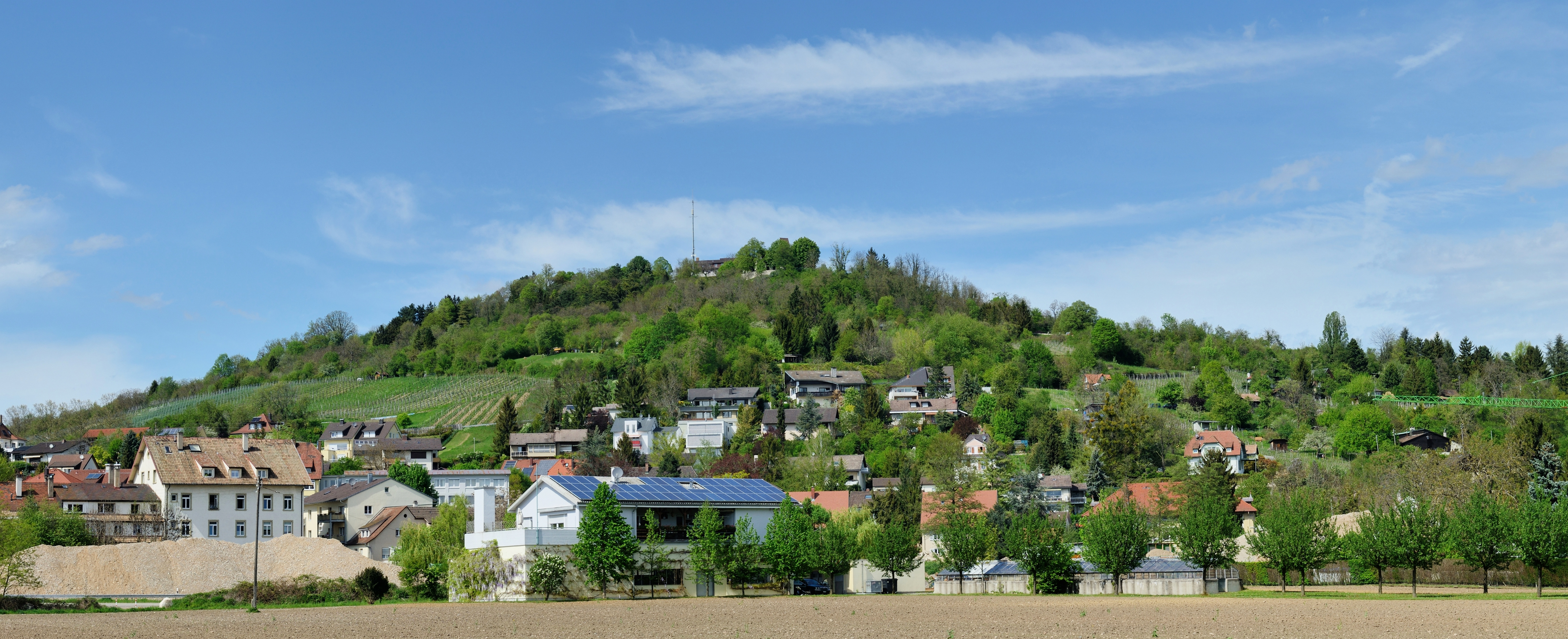
- Tüllinger Berg as seen from Riehen

Highest point
- Elevation: 460.2 m (1,510 ft)
- Prominence: 94m
- Coordinates: 47°37′11″N 7°38′8″E

Geography
- Location within Baden-Württemberg
- Location: Lörrach, Lörrach District, Baden-Württemberg, Germany
- Parent range: Markgräfler Hügelland

The Tüllinger Berg (lit. German: Tüllinger mountain) short form Tüllinger, also known as Tüllinger Hügel in Switzerland, is a partly forested mountain located at an elevation of 460.2 m above sea level. It is situated in the southwest of Baden-Württemberg, at the border triangle of Germany, France, and Switzerland. The mountain extends about two kilometers from east to west and about five kilometers from north to south, forming a natural border between the urban areas of Lörrach and Weil am Rhein. Notably, the Tüllinger Berg is characterized by the break-off edge of the high strand of the Rhine Valley and the meadow floodplain. The slope of the Tüllinger Berg, especially with its western mountain nose, defines the surrounding landscape. The border between Germany and Switzerland runs along the southeastern foothills of the mountain.

The Tüllinger Berg is crisscrossed by numerous hiking trails, serving as a vantage point and a recreational area for the Markgräfler Hügelland region. Due to its soil diversity and mild climate, the slopes of the Tüllinger are utilized for cultivating various crops, including the renowned Markgräfler wine. Large portions of the mountain have been designated as protected areas, making it an essential habitat for a diverse range of flora and fauna.

== Location ==
The Tüllinger Berg lies predominantly within the city limits of Lörrach. To the east of the hilltop is the district of Tüllingen, offering scenic views of the border triangle, the Rhine bend, and the surrounding cities of Lörrach, Weil am Rhein, and Basel. The northeastern foothills of the Tüllinger Berg border the district of Tumringen, while the northwestern end is adjacent to the community of Binzen. The eastern slope of the Tüllinger Berg is not very rugged, but it still rises about 160 meters compared to the city area of Lörrach to the east and the valley axis. Compared to the city area of Weil, the difference in elevation is approximately 181 meters.

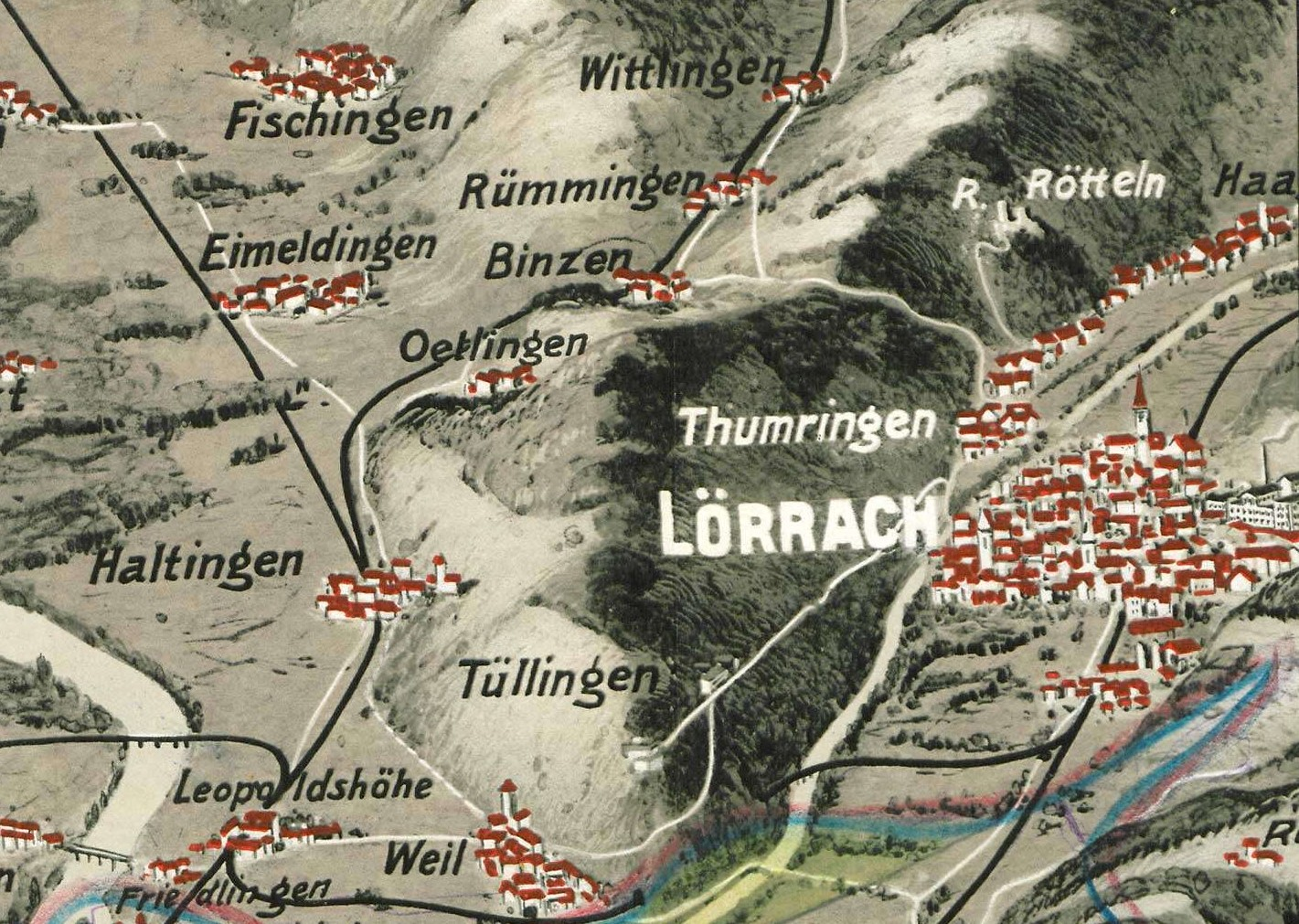
Representation of the Tüllinger Berg on a map from 1916

On the western side of the hilltop is the exposed district of Ötlingen, which is part of the town of Weil am Rhein. This mountain spur is sometimes referred to as "Ötlinger Berg" or "Ötlinger Hornspitze" and reaches heights of up to 355 meters. The foothills of the western slope are located in the district of Haltingen. A very small share of the Tüllinger Berg's area belongs to the Swiss municipality of Riehen, which has some vineyards on the southeastern slope, known as "Schlipf".

== Protected areas ==
In 1980, significant portions of the Tüllinger Berg were officially declared a Landschaftsschutzgebiet or LSG (landscape protection area) to preserve the areas for local recreation. Additional protected areas were declared in the 1990s. As a result, a 345-hectare region of the mountain, composed of three different sub-areas, is designated as the Tüllinger Berg and Tongrube Rümmingen Protected Area under the Fauna-Flora-Habitat Directive (FFH). Furthermore, the exposed location of the mountain provides crucial weather stations with essential data for weather forecasting. The eastern hill of the Tüllinger Berg belongs to the western edge of the Southern Black Forest Nature Park. The Tüllinger Berg is a core habitat of high nature conservation value, and numerous projects and measures are being undertaken to enhance its conservation efforts.

There are six different protected areas on the Tüllinger Berg:

- Landscape protection area Tüllinger Berg,
- Natura 2000 area ("FFH area") 8311-341 Tüllinger Berg and clay pit Rümmingen,
- areal natural monument,
- Bird sanctuary 8311-441 Tüllinger Berg and Gleusen (548 hectares),
- legally protected biotopes in open country (according to § 30 BNatSchG) and
- legally protected biotopes in the forest (according to § 30 BNatSchG and/or § 30a LWaldG).

== Description ==
=== Geology ===
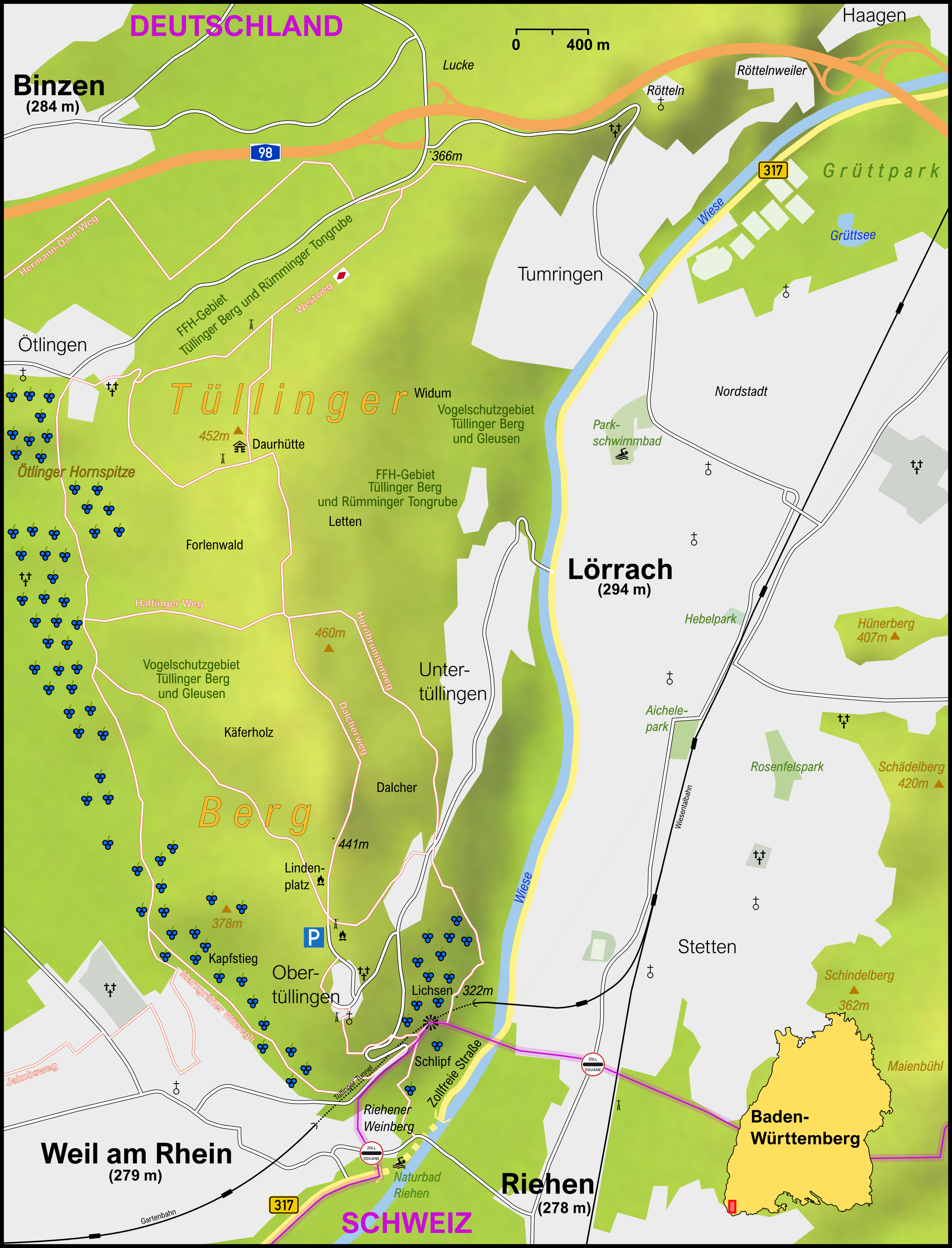
Map of the Tüllinger Berg with the main traffic routes and the most important hiking trails

The Tüllinger Berg at the exit of the Wiesental in the south of the Upper Rhine Plain is mostly located in the Tüllinger freshwater molasse, which is overlain by Cyrene marl and sandy parts of the Alsace molasse. The mountain features alternating layers of white marly limestone and fat greenish lettuce beds, which create a steeper slope of about 20 meters around the mountain. Being the southern end of the Markgräfler Hügelland, the Tüllinger Berg is preserved in relief inversion within the flexural rim depression, leading to a geological structure that deviates from the rest of the hilly terrain. Despite its relatively small size, the Tüllinger Berg has a high altitude.

In 1821, Peter Merian described the precipitation of a "freshwater formation" at the "Dillinger Berg" (Tüllinger Berg) and identified three types of rocks in his description: first, a whitish to dirty yellow or brown friable marl; second, a firm rock with "a fracture that is shallowly fusiform on the whole"; and third, a firm yellow-grayish or black limestone with fossils (planorbs and lymnae).

Like the Delsberg Basin, the mountain was formed by rift fracturing and primarily consists of Paleogene or Neogene rocks. A fault runs north-south within the Tüllinger Berg, with another found at the foot of the slope. Consequently, the stratigraphic sequences of the rocks in the mountain are displaced relative to each other.

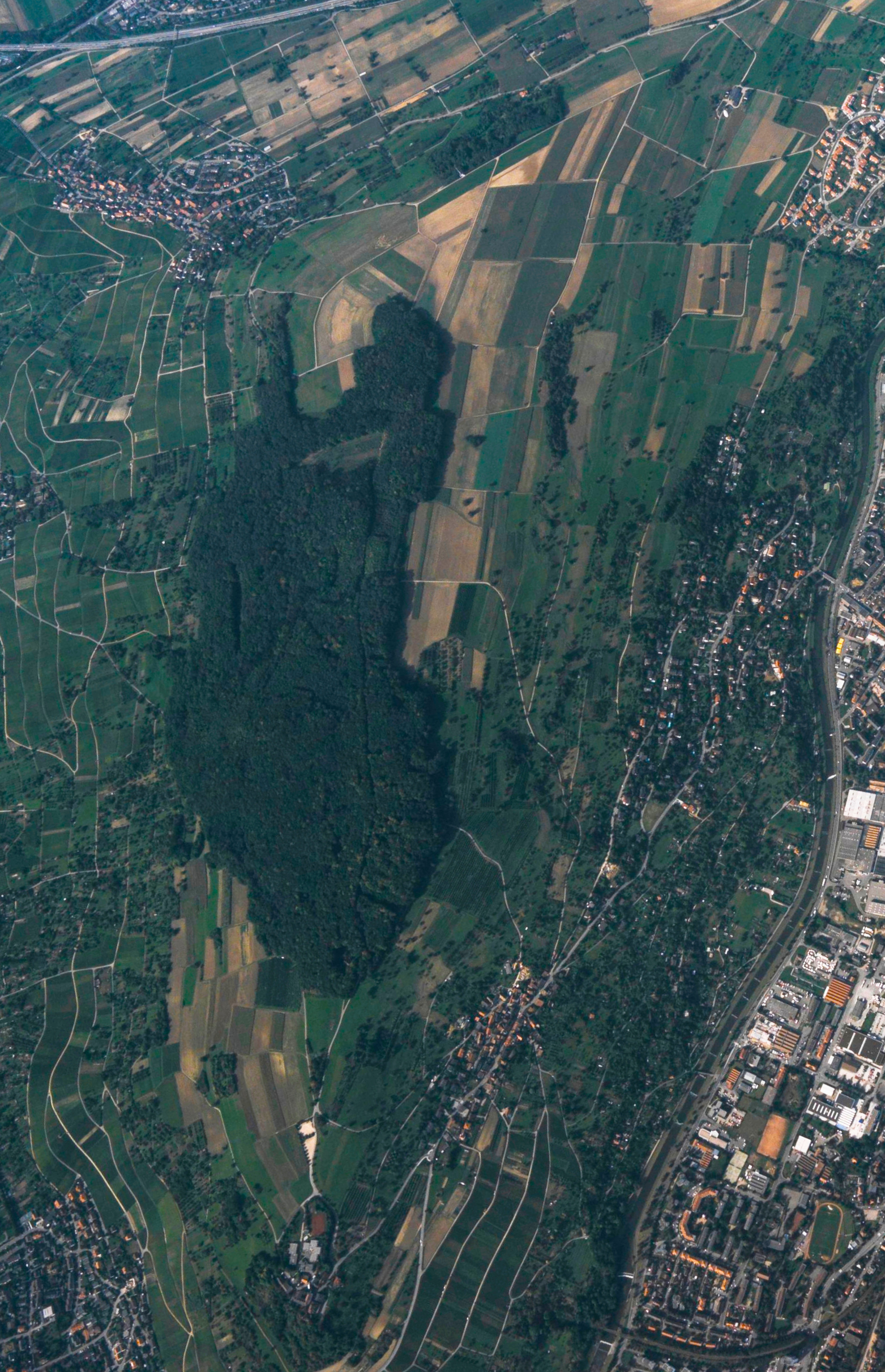
Vertical picture from Tüllinger Berg, 1993

The soils of the Tüllinger Berg are composed of loess and clayey-sandy, calcareous soils, which are utilized for vineyards and fruit plantations. Along the ridge of the mountain, Upper Oligocene strata of clay marl, freshwater limestones, and fine sands can be found. In certain areas of lesser extent, loose or solid rock bodies with largely dissolved structures (landslide mass) are present. The southwest slope is known as Schlipf due to its nature.

=== Slips ===
Due to the geological composition of the Tüllinger Berg, it is prone to earth slips and landslides. As early as 1328, Riehen municipal records mentioned "dem sliffe", and in 1344, Weiler records also referred to it. Major landslides were recorded in chronicles in the years 1450, 1697, 1712, 1831, and 1910.

One of the most severe landslides, known as the "Schlipf", occurred on July 22, 1758, with contemporary accounts stating that "the vineyard in Schlipf opened in an uncanny way." The holes formed were so large that could fit entire houses. The sinkhole caused springs to dry up and paths and vineyards to sink. The pond was filled up for 180 meters. The event was caused by continuous rainfall and flooding of the meadow. The "große Gerütsche" (great Gerütsche) was pictorially recorded by the Basel topographer and draftsman Emanuel Büchel. The historical Schlipfe found its way into the field names already centuries ago. The Schlipfe is the name of the meadow affected by the landslide.

Although the Schlipf towards the Riehen side was more significant due to the steeper slope, landslides also occurred towards the Haltingen side. Human intervention, such as road construction, excavation of ditches and pits, and other slope incursions, has sometimes caused or facilitated major landslides after 1758. While landslides became less common in the 20th century, road damage caused by them continued to occur in the 1960s and 1970s. Notably, both the railroad tunnel of 1890 and the Ötlinger Berg feature molasse masses that originally came from higher elevations of the Tüllinger Berg.

=== Natural classification ===
The Tüllinger Berg (201c) is part of the natural area 201 Markgräfler Hügelland within the main natural unit 20 Südliches Oberrheintiefland (Southern Upper Rhine Lowlands) according to the systematics of the Handbuch der naturräumlichen Gliederung Deutschlands (Handbook of the Natural Area Classification of Germany). It forms the southernmost offshoot of the Markgräfler Hügelland.

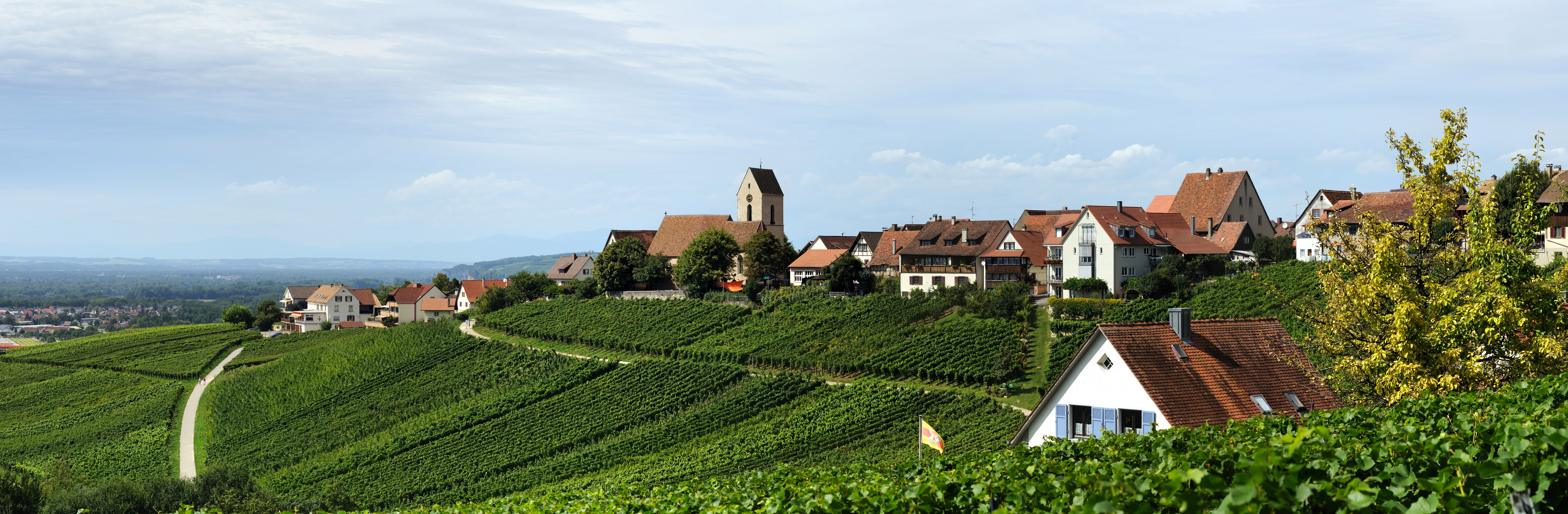
View of Ötlingen from the western slope of the Tüllinger Berg in a north-westerly direction

=== Flora und Fauna ===
The Tüllinger Berg is home to the Cirl Bunting and the Wryneck, with the Cirl Bunting population being the largest in southern Baden. Populations of the Redstart and Hoopoe have also been recorded. In the beetle wood, the oriole has been observed. The area of the Tüllinger Berg is ornithologically important beyond the region due to the presence of a large number of bird species, totaling about 40, in the structured and old-wooded orchard meadows. The old and dead wood-rich beech forest provides habitat for cavity-breeding forest bird species such as the black, middle, and gray woodpecker, as well as nest-breeding species like the black kite and tree hawk. These bird species utilize the adjacent open land for foraging.

In the Schlipf, wild tulips (Tulipa sylvestris) bloom among the vines in spring. This relative of today's cultivated tulip was probably introduced into the gardens of Central Europe in the 16th century as an ornamental plant from the Mediterranean region. It was widespread in the Kaiserstuhl, in the Markgräfler Land, and in Alsace. However, due to the use of herbicides in soil management, wild tulip populations are in sharp decline.

=== Traffic routes ===
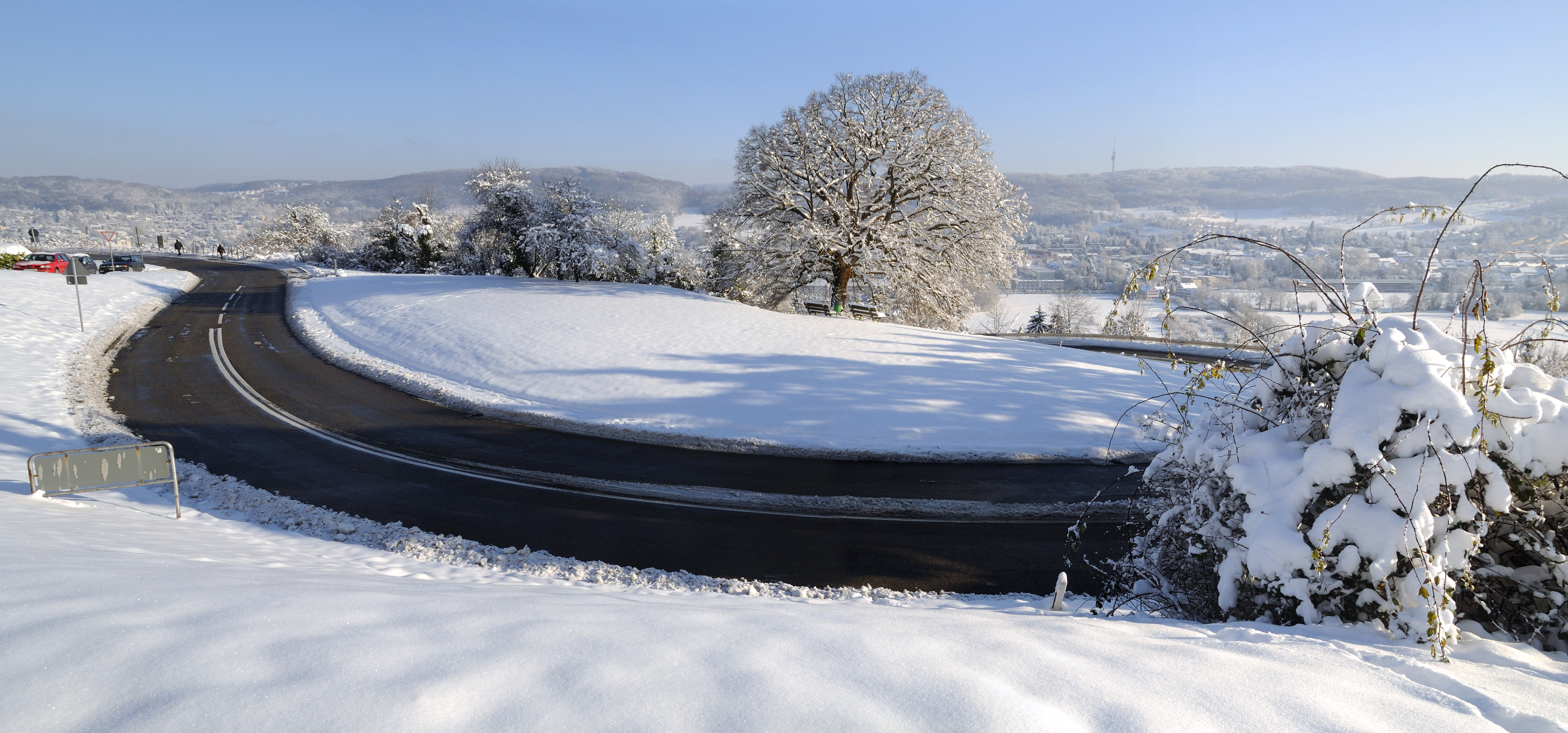
Pass road in winter between Tüllingen and Weil

The Tüllinger ridge, being a natural barrier, has two smaller mountain passes running along its edge. One of these passes leads from Alt-Weil to Untertüllingen, situated at an altitude of 381 meters, and continues on to Lörrach. In order to relieve this cumbersome transit traffic, the duty-free road, which runs partly on Swiss territory, was opened in 2013 as a link between the two towns. This nearly 740-meter-long connecting section consists of a bridge and tunnel structure that also crosses the Wiese River at this point. At the northern edge, the foothills of the Tüllinger Berg meet the Röttler Forest, which belongs to the Black Forest. This creates a busy pass crossing called "Lucke" (366 meters above sea level) and crosses several traffic routes, including the A98, in an east-west direction.

At the southeastern foothill of the Tüllinger Berg, the Weil am Rhein-Lörrach railroad line, also called Gartenbahn, runs through the mountain with the 864-meter-long Tüllinger Tunnel. It was opened on May 20, 1890, after three years of construction.

=== Lindenplatz ===
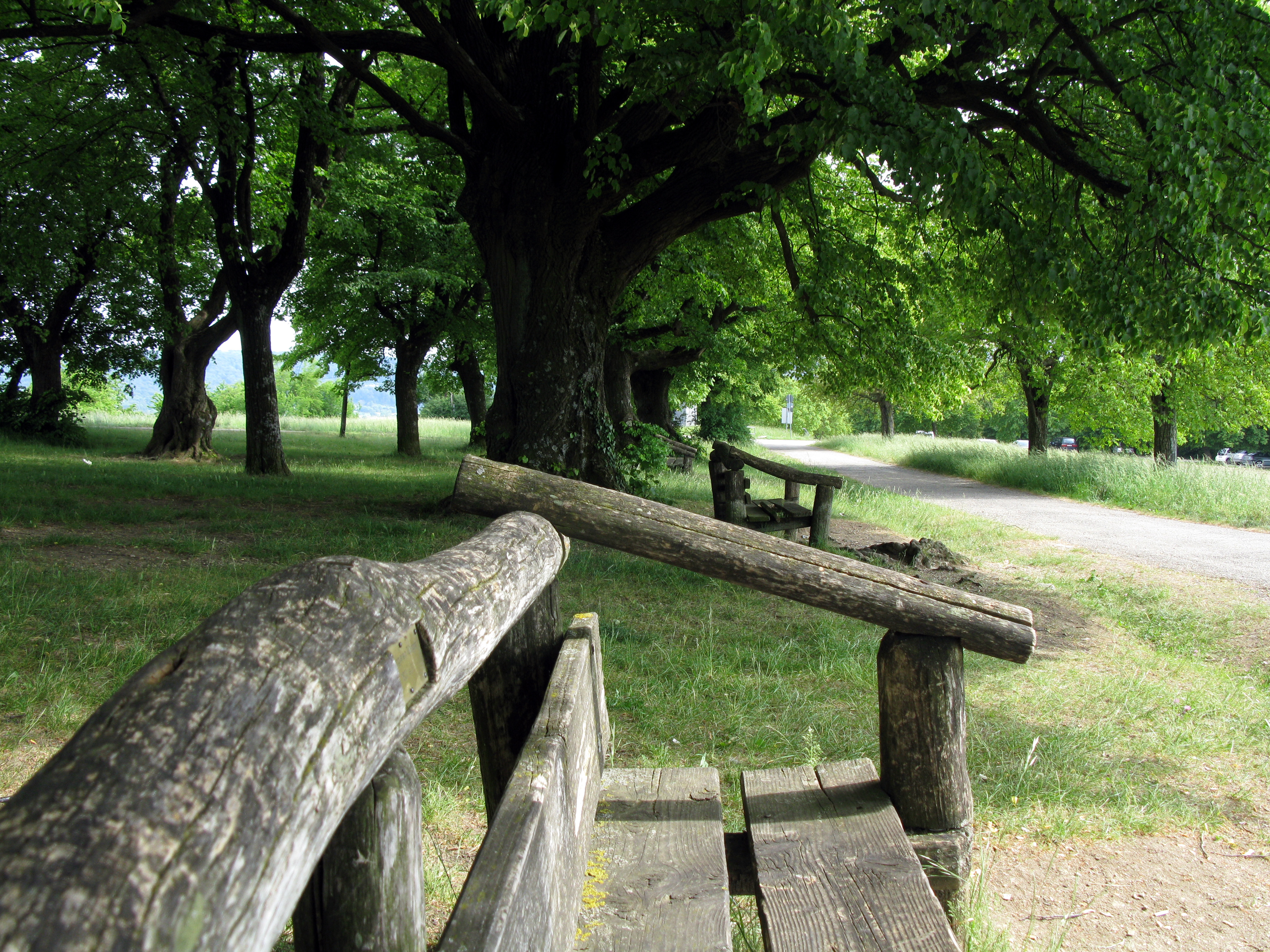
Lindenplatz on the Tüllinger Berg

A frequently used square on the plateau-like flattened ridge of the Tüllinger Berg is the Lindenplatz. It is located slightly above Obertüllingen and can be reached by public bus as well as private transport. A parking lot for hikers is available for car traffic. The square is framed by linden trees, some of which are centuries old. From the Lindenplatz, you have a comprehensive view, especially of Basel Bay, Weil am Rhein, and the beginning of the Upper Rhine Valley. The traditional Fastnachtsfeuer (carnival bonfire) takes place nearby in the open spaces at the edge of the forest. The square is often used as a starting point for guided hikes on the Tüllinger and is a popular attraction for people from the region. There are barbecue areas between the Lindenplatz and the northern Käferholz.

At the Lindenplatz, there is a demolished Hindenburg monument. The monument was erected by the Hüninger Landwehr, stationed in the then-German Alsace, in connection with the rear line of defense of the empire. About 200 meters north of it, at the edge of the forest, there is a monument to Margrave Ludwig Wilhelm in memory of the Battle of Käferholz.

=== Hiking and theme trails ===
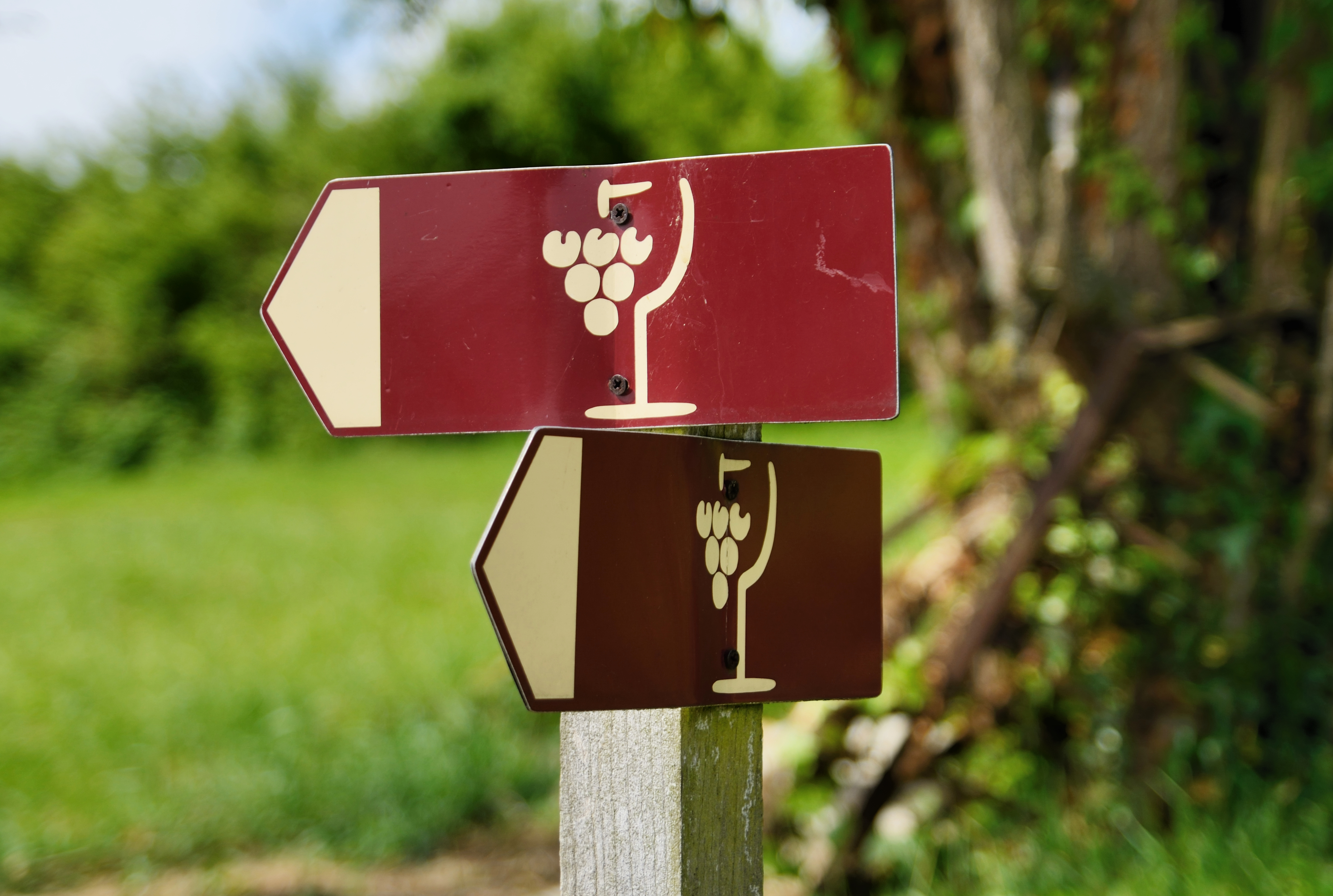
Guide to the Wine Trail

The eleven-kilometer-long 13th and last stage of the Westweg (variant A) from Wollbach to Basel runs over the Tüllinger Berg. Along the Westweg, a few kilometers from the highest point of the Tüllinger Berg is the Daur-Hütte, named after Hermann Daur, a refuge at the edge of the forest. The 92-kilometer Markgräfler Wiiwegli ends at Ötlingen on the panorama path of the Tüllinger Berg and then leads down to the central Lindenplatz in Alt-Weil.

To bring visitors closer to the mountain, the Trinational Environmental Center has put together six tours: North Tour, Art Trail, Summer Tour, Vine Tour, South Tour, and a Round Tour.

The Black Forest Tourism Association, in cooperation with the local tourism associations, has set up three wine trails: one just under two kilometers long (Tüllinger Weinweg) and two just under four kilometers long (Riehener and Weiler Weinweg) panoramic trails along the mountainside with a few meters of elevation gain. A total of 50 thematic panels provide information about the location, wines, landscape, as well as nature, and the everyday life of the winegrowers. Various guided tours are also offered.

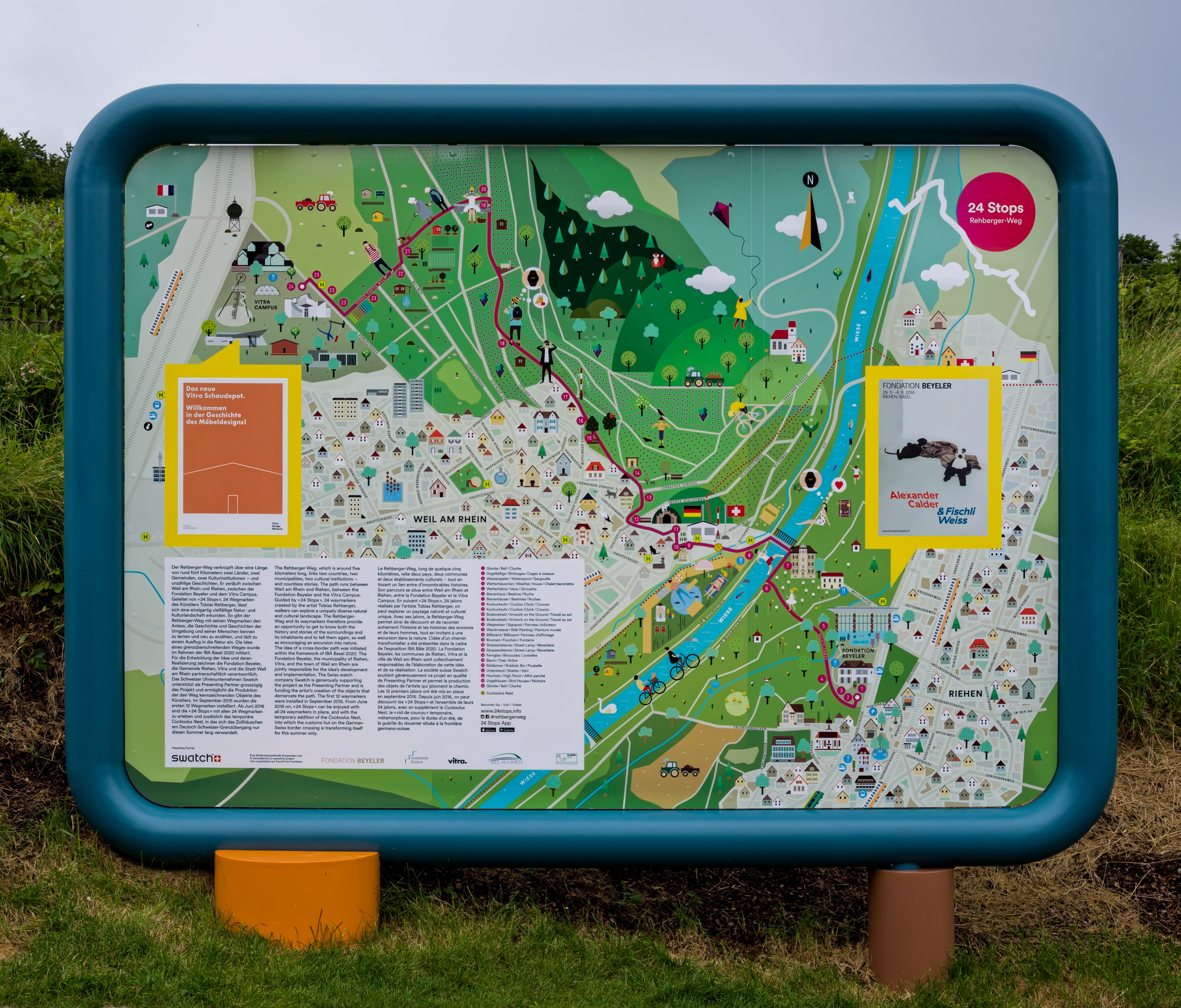
The Art Trail 24 stops

A section of the Jakobsweg, coming from Binzen, leads through the village street of Ötlingen and further along the Tüllinger Berg to Weil am Rhein and into Switzerland.

On the southwestern edge, the five-kilometer-long Art Trail "24 Stops", also known as the Rehberger Trail, leads from the Vitra Campus in Weil to the Fondation Beyeler in Riehen, with 24 sculptures and installations by German artist Tobias Rehberger. The bi-national art trail thus connects two countries, two municipalities, and two important places for art. The first twelve waypoints were installed in September 2015, and since June 2016 all 24 waypoints have been accessible for walking.

Along the state border are several boundary stones, some of which are several hundred years old. Boundary stone No. 38 on Lichsenweg, dating from 1491, was almost completely covered by overgrown as well as soil until the 1970s. The elevation and centimeter-precise realignment of this boundary stone was carried out by representatives of both state surveying offices. To commemorate this boundary stone, the Düllinger Landesgrenzstein-Bänkli was inaugurated on September 16, 1997. On this bench, one sits in Germany, while the outstretched feet are on Swiss territory. Next to the bench is the sculpture De Wiibuur vom Grenzeck by the artist Wolfgang Gerstner.

== Usage ==
=== Fruit growing and forestry ===
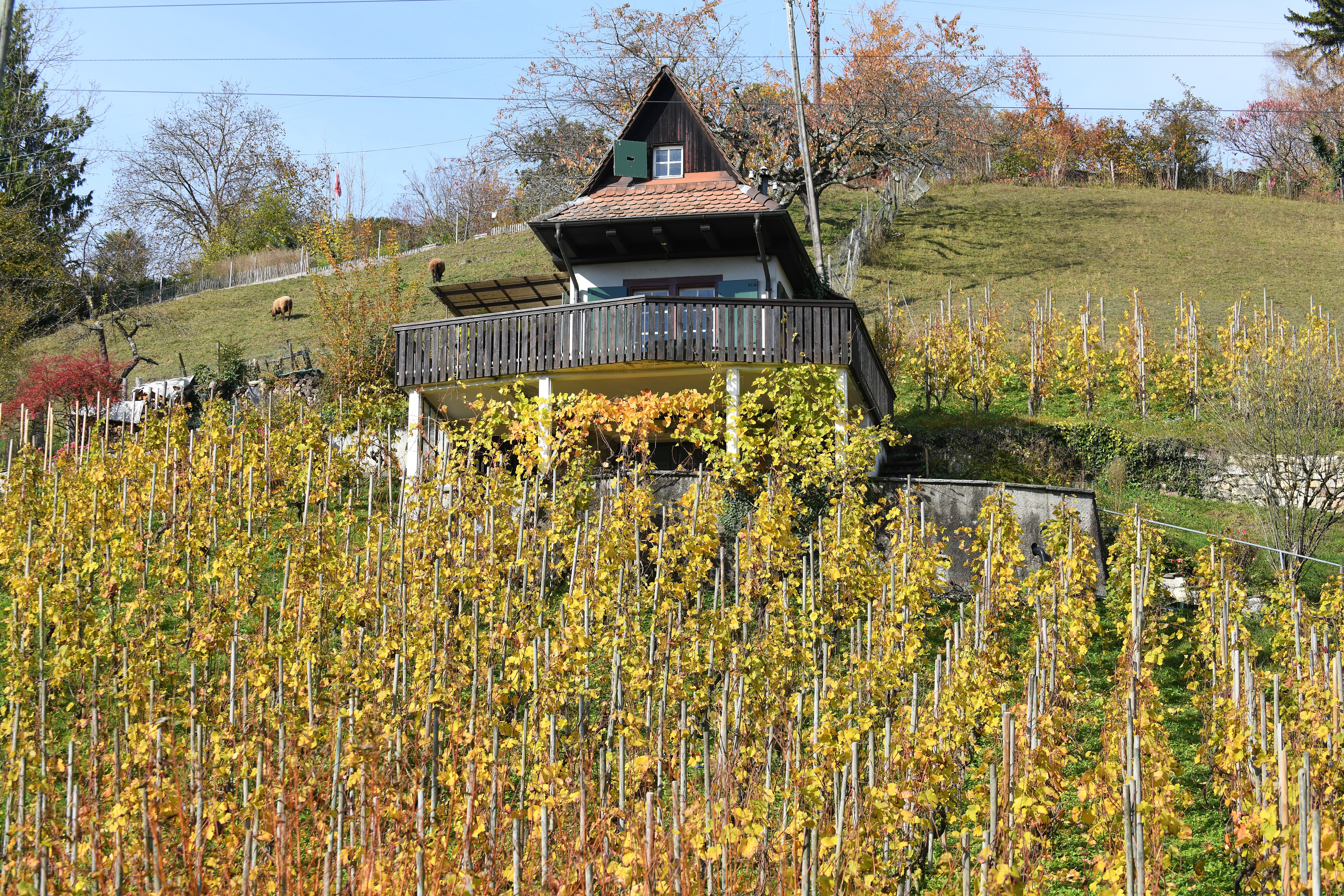
Winegrowing on the Tüllinger Berg (Riehener Weinberg)

In addition to extensive scattered orchards and vineyards, the Tüllinger Berg is characterized by its grazing land, a small amount of arable land, especially in the northern part, and large areas of contiguous deciduous forest on the ridge. The hilltop of the Tüllinger Berg is almost completely forested. The southern part of the forest is called Käferholz, and the northern part is called Forlenwald.

=== Viticulture ===
The mild climate, primarily influenced by warm air masses from the Mediterranean region through the Burgundian Gate during spring, along with the diverse and nutrient-rich soils, allows for the cultivation of wine on the Tüllinger slopes in the Markgräfler Land. Closed vineyards are located in the south between Baselweg, Lichsenweg, and at the lower Wagenkehrweg in the direction of Alt-Weil. Due to the mild climate, the Markgräfler wine thrives on the southwest slope of the Tüllinger.

Among others, the varieties Gutedel, Silvaner, and Spätburgunder grow there. While on the southern slope, due to the higher hours of sunshine, about 60% of red wine vines and about 40% of white wine vines are grown, the ratio is reversed on the eastern slope. The vineyards are distributed among seven German and two Swiss wineries - some private, some cooperative.

== See also ==
- Ötlingen (Weil am Rhein)
