= Battle of Friedlingen =

1702 battle of the War of the Spanish Succession

- Part of the War of the Spanish Succession
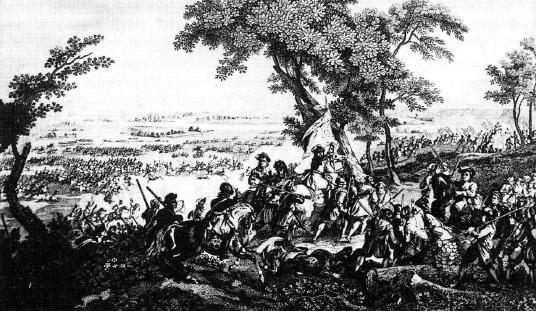
- The Battle of Friedlingen, unknown author
Date	14 October 1702
Location	Weil am Rhein, Baden-Württemberg
Result	French victory

Belligerents
Kingdom of France	Holy Roman Empire

Commanders and leaders
Claude Louis Hector de Villars; Lt General Desbordes †; Comte de Magnac	Louis William, Margrave of Baden-Baden; Karl von Fürstenberg-Möskirch †; Margrave of Ansbach; Margrave of Baden-Durlach; Count Hohenzollern †; Count Prosper Fürstenberg †

Strength
17,000 men, 35 cannons	14,000 men

Casualties and losses
2,700	2,900

The Battle of Friedlingen took place on 14 October 1702, during the War of the Spanish Succession. Most of the fighting centred around Friedlingen, now a suburb of Weil am Rhein, on the current border between Baden-Württemberg in Germany, and Switzerland. A French force under Villars defeated an Imperial army commanded by Louis William, Margrave of Baden-Baden.

The capture of Landau in September allowed Louis William to threaten the French border region of Alsace. Shortly before, Maximilian II Emanuel, Elector of Bavaria joined the French alliance, and Villars was ordered to cross the Rhine at Huningue near the Swiss border, then link up with him. Although Louis William was initially able to block the advance, he was outflanked when French troops crossed the Rhine further north, and began retreating early on the morning of 14 October.

Hoping to take advantage, Villars promptly attacked, but Louis William drove him off and fell back in good order. Although neither side was able to gain a clear advantage, it is generally considered a French victory since Villars prevented an Imperial invasion of Alsace. However, he was unable to link up with the Bavarian army before winter, leaving the immediate strategic position largely unchanged.

== Background ==
The War of the Spanish Succession began in March 1701, but for the first year was largely confined to the Spanish Netherlands and Northern Italy. Fighting expanded into the Rhineland in June 1702, when an Imperial army under Louis William, Margrave of Baden-Baden, crossed the Rhine north of Speyer in the Rhineland-Palatinate. This threatened the French border region of Alsace, although Louis William first focused on capturing Landau. (Note: Now in Germany, the town was part of France from 1680 to 1815) The garrison finally surrendered in September, shortly after Bavaria joined the French alliance.

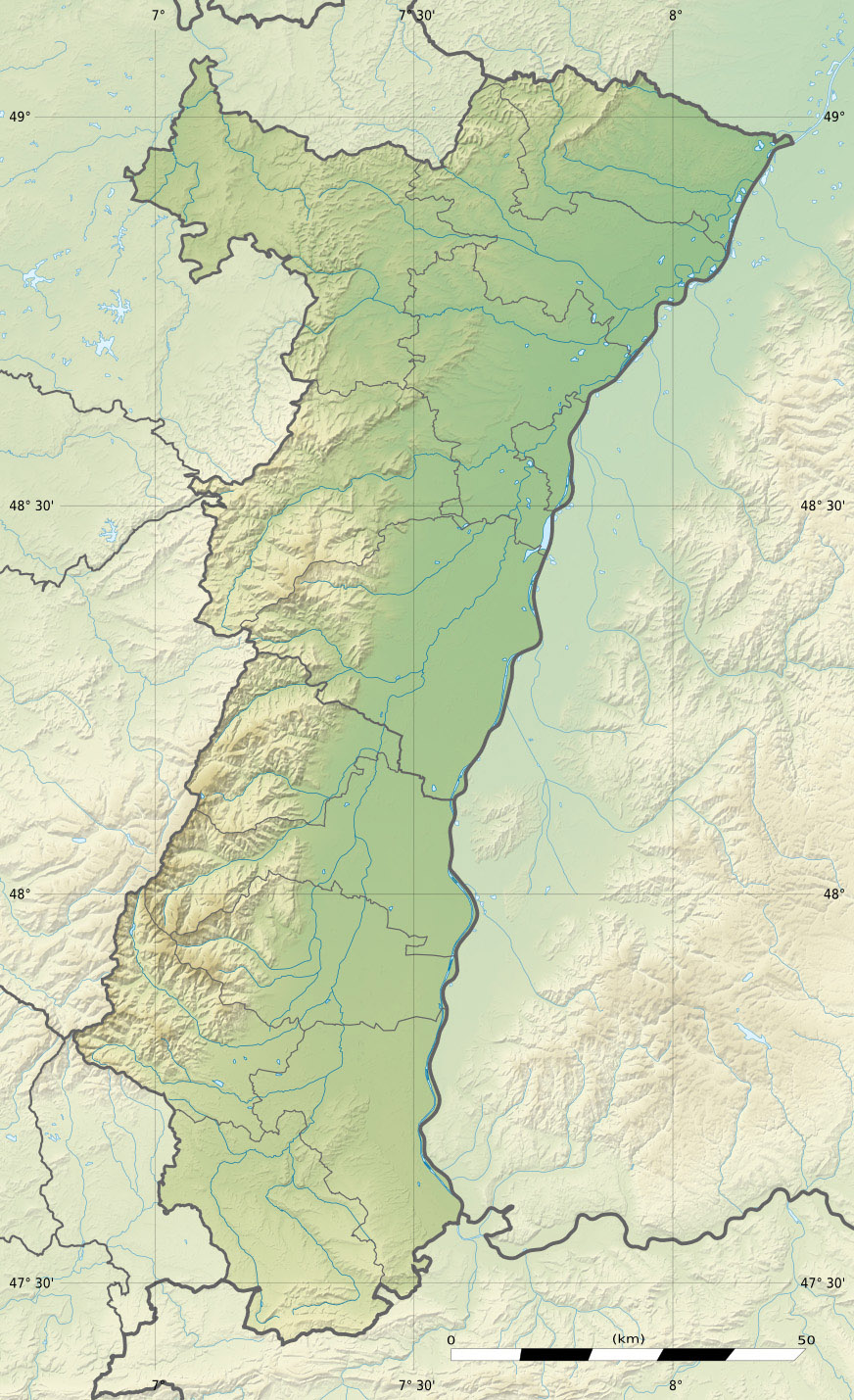
Alsace (dark green, left) and Baden-Württemberg(light green, right), key locations in text; Note: the River Rhine forms the modern border between France and Germany

The main French army in Alsace was based in Strasbourg, under the overall direction of Nicolas Catinat, commander of operations in Southern Germany and Northern Italy. Once Bavaria entered the war, he ordered Villars to take 17,000 men, the majority of the troops available, cross the Rhine, and link up with Maximilian II Emanuel, Elector of Bavaria. On 28 September, Villars arrived in Huningue, on the French border north of the Swiss city of Basel.

Pre-warned of French intentions, Louis William left 6,000 men to hold Landau. He quickly marched south with 14,000 troops and reached Friedlingen on the right bank of the Rhine opposite Huningue. Situated in a bend of the Rhine, Friedlingen was flanked by the Kander and Wiese rivers, with the Tüllinger Heights behind. His infantry constructed defensive positions directly in front of Huningue, blocking the French advance.

Judging these too strong for a direct attack, Villars first tried to outflank them by asking permission to enter the neutral Swiss Canton of Basel to the south. This was denied and he spent the next few days building a bridge over the Rhine, although he delayed an assault until 8,000 French troops from Breisach occupied Neuenburg, 28 kilometres (17 mi) further north. Outnumbered and threatened from two sides, on the evening of 13 October Louis William ordered a general withdrawal towards Freiburg.

== Battle ==
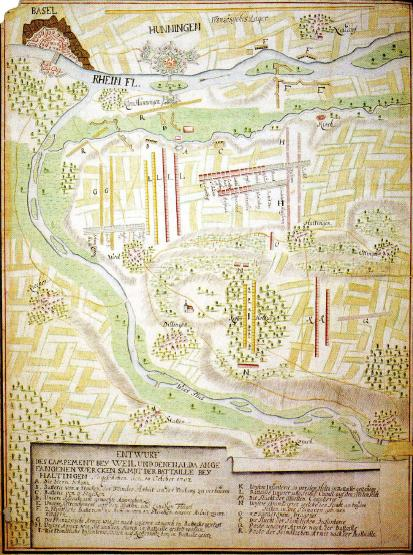
Battle Map; Rhine at top, Imperial positions (red) right, Kander to rear, French starting line (yellow) left, in front of the Wiese, Tüllinger Heights bottom of map, with Käfernhölz Forest immediately behind

Covered by a rearguard under Karl von Fürstenberg-Möskirch, early on 14 October the Imperial troops evacuated their positions in front of Huningue. By 8:00 am, they had begun withdrawing over the Kander, allowing the French to cross the Rhine without resistance. Seeing this, Louis William turned his men around, and by 10:00 am most of his army was deployed in two lines facing the French, with the Kander to their rear. Villars now ordered his infantry under Lt General Desbordes to capture the Tüllinger Heights on his right flank, which were still held by the Imperials.

Louis William responded by sending reinforcements led by Count Prosper Fürstenberg and the Margraves of Ansbach and Baden-Durlach to occupy the Käfernhölz Forest, which lay immediately behind the Tüllinger. Despite the difficult terrain, the French drove the Imperials off the heights, then out of the Käfernhölz. To cover their retreat and cause a diversion, the Imperial cavalry under Count Hohenzollern were ordered to attack the main French lines. Despite superior numbers, they were repulsed by their opponents under the Comte de Magnac, who drove them as far as the Kander before ending the action.

However, the French units on the heights had been thrown into confusion by the Imperial counterattack. Those occupying the woods held their positions, but the majority fell back to their starting positions on the plain, where they were eventually reformed. Their retreat allowed troops under Prosper Fürstenberg to retake the Käfernhölz Forest at bayonet point, effectively ending the fighting around 13:00. The Imperial infantry waited until nightfall before continuing their retreat to Staufen im Breisgau, at which point Villars sent Maximillian news of his victory.

== Aftermath ==
Both sides lost a number of senior officers; Desbordes was killed, while Counts Karl von Fürstenberg-Möskirch, Prosper Fürstenberg, and Hohenzollern died of wounds received in the battle. Estimates of French losses vary, ranging from 1,600 to 2,700 dead or wounded, with Imperial casualties around 3,000.

A minor French victory, Friedlingen had little immediate impact on the strategic situation. Louis William split his army, part based in Freiburg covering the passes into Bavaria, with the rest occupying positions in lines stretching from Kehl to Hornberg. Villars and his troops returned to Strasbourg, where they took up winter quarters. One historian suggests its main impact was on the reputation of Villars, who published a widely circulated and self-congratulatory account of the battle. He was promoted Marshal of France shortly afterwards.

== Sources ==
- Bodart, Gaston (1908). Militär-historisches Kriegs-Lexikon (1618-1905).
- Lynn, John A. (1999). The Wars of Louis XIV 1667-1714. Longman. ISBN 978-0-582-05629-9.
- Nolan, Cathal J (2008). Wars of the age of Louis XIV, 1650-1715: an encyclopedia of global warfare and civilization. Bloomsbury 3PL. ISBN 978-0274973460.
- Périni, Colonel Hardy de (1896). Batailles françaises; 6e série (in French). Ernest Flammarion.
