= Tüllinger Tunnel =

Railroad tunnel in Weil am Rhein

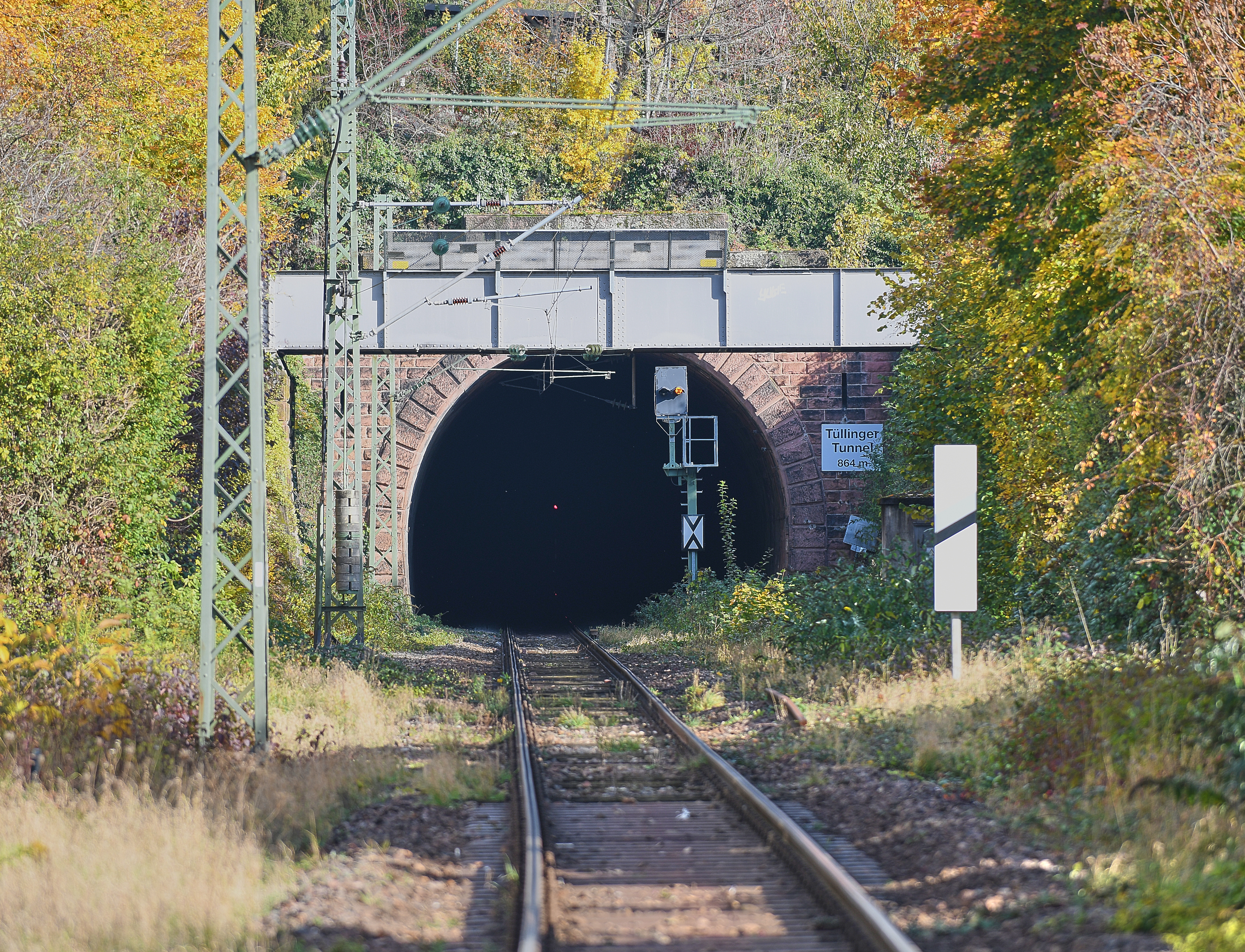
- Southwest portal of the Tüllinger Tunnel
- Interactive map of Tüllinger Tunnel

Overview
- Location: Weil am Rhein
- Coordinates: Southwest portal 47°35′34.98″N 7°38′21.39″E East portal 47°35′51.68″N 7°38′53.5″E
- No. of stations: Weil am Rhein–Lörrach railroad line

Operation
- Opened: 1890
- Operator: DB Netz

Technical
- Length: 864

The Tüllinger Tunnel, more commonly known as the Tüllinger-Berg Tunnel, is an 864-meter-long railway tunnel on the Weil am Rhein-Lörrach railway line (Gartenbahn) between the cities of Weil am Rhein and Lörrach in Baden-Württemberg, Germany. Opened in 1890, the single-tube tunnel has a clearance for two tracks; however, it is only used for one track. The Tüllinger Tunnel is located between the Lörrach Dammstraße and Weil am Rhein Ost stops.

== Description ==
=== Location ===
The tunnel passes under the southern foothills of the Tüllinger Berg, which gives the structure its name. The tunnel's western portal, located in the middle of a residential area in Alt-Weil, is in the city of Weiler. The structure initially runs straight from southwest to east, then curves to the right and comes within about 11 meters of the Swiss border. At the east portal, the rail line has risen about six meters. The east portal, located in a wooded and impassable area, is also in the town of Weiler, just a few meters from the city limits of Lörrach. About 100 meters east of the east portal, the line crosses the Wiesebrücke bridge to Stetten, which crosses the Wiese and the B 317 highway.

The tunnel crosses layers of molasse rock consisting of clay marl, limestone, and partially leached gypsum marl.

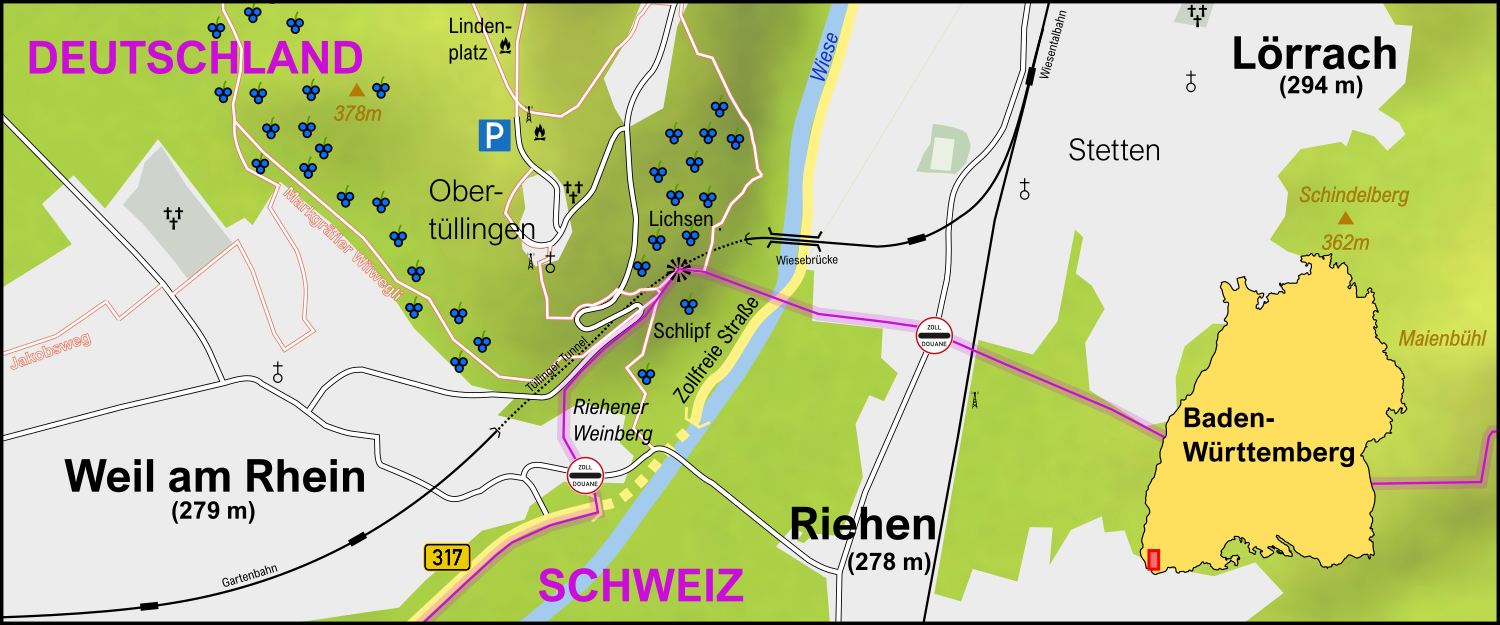
Map of the Tüllinger Tunnel and the Wiesebrücke

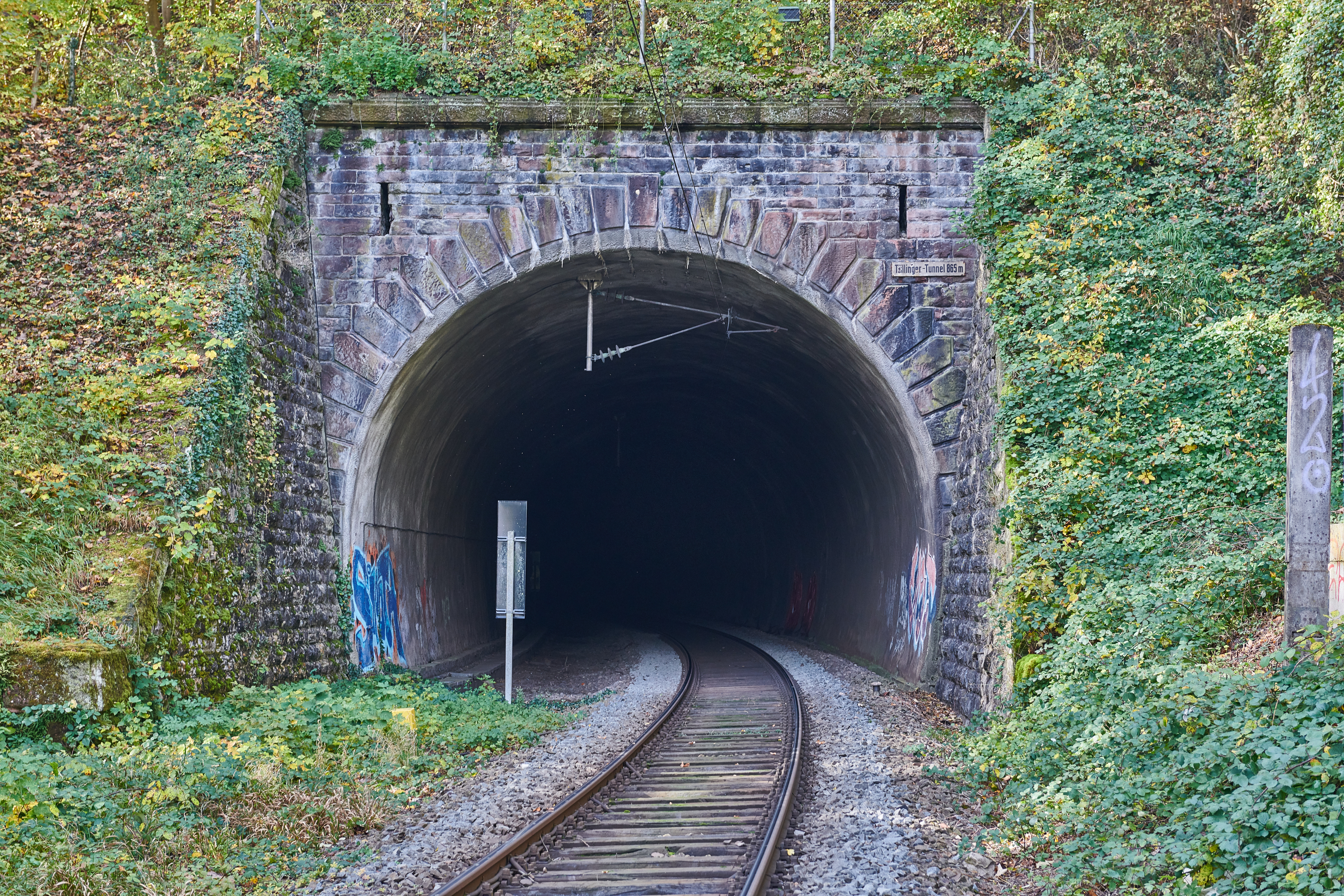
East portal (Lörrach side) of the Tüllinger Tunnel

=== Structure ===
Of the total 863.9 meters of tunnel construction, 245.8 meters were initially constructed with a closed wall profile. The remaining 618.1 meters of the tunnel consisted only of abutments and a ceiling vault. The entire length of the completed tunnel is lined. The vault was installed at the base of the tunnel only after the tunnel was completed. Once the tunnel was completely lined, the invert was constructed. Limestone from Lörrach and Inzlingen was used for the abutments. The height from the floor to the crown is 5.7 meters. Every 25 meters in the tunnel there are two opposite niches 1 meter wide, 2.1 meters high, and 0.9 meters deep.

== History ==
=== Construction work ===
The railroad between Weil and Lörrach, planned as a strategic route to bypass Switzerland, required a tunnel through the Tüllinger Berg, which separates the two towns, because of their border location and the unavoidable intersection of the villages. The Oberländer Bote reported on December 23, 1887:

"Construction of the new line has now begun on this side of the Tüllinger Berg and a number of workers are currently busy laying the track bed from Baseler Chaussee to the Wiese. There are also workers on the lower meadows. However, there are not many of them yet, and the onset of heavy frost may make it necessary to suspend the work completely for some time. Work on laying the second track on the Stetten-Lörrach line is also expected to start soon. So there should be no shortage of work in our region in the near future."

Work began on the west side of the lower tunnel on February 5, 1888, and on the east side on March 21, 1888. Excavation was done in two shifts, each shift consisting of six miners and six haulers. Masonry work began on the west side on May 16 and the east side on June 18, 1888. The tunnel was broken through on October 4, 1888, at about 6 p.m. The tunnel was opened to traffic on May 20, 1890. The excavation was done with great precision. While there was a deviation of 7 centimeters in direction, the deviation in height was 0. The construction costs were estimated at 1 million marks, of which almost 40% was for earth and rock moving work and a good half for the lining and vaulting. The comparatively short construction time for the tunnel can be explained by the strategic military importance of the structure in terms of being able to relocate armed forces to this part of the country. To be able to cope with any sudden mass transport, the tunnel was also built with two tracks to ensure the efficiency of the transport line.

=== Since the opening ===
Towards the end of World War II, on April 23, 1945, the Tüllinger Tunnel was to be blown up by a demolition squad because of the approaching French troops. A soldier on guard duty, who was privy to the plan, informed a fellow soldier and had the blasting wires cut, which ultimately prevented the blast.

Over the decades, repairs have been made to various parts of the tunnel.

According to an assessment by Deutsche Bahn in 2015, the Tüllinger Tunnel was in a condition worthy of renovation. In the worst case, even a new construction would have to be considered. An accurate assessment could only be made with detailed planning. After a new investigation, Deutsche Bahn announced in 2020 that the tunnel did not need to be renovated and that no technical measures were necessary. The decision was based on regular inspections and continuous measurements of the tunnel lining.

== Bibliography ==
- August von Würthenau: Denkschrift über die Erbauung der Bahnen im Badischen Oberland Leopoldshöhe–Lörrach, Schopfheim–Säckingen, Weizen–Immendingen zur Umgebung des Schweizergebiets. Chr. Fr. Müller'sche Court Printing House, 1890, p. 75-82 (digitized version).
- Julius Kraus: Die strategische Eisenbahn. in: The Markgräflerland, issue 2/1986, p. 81-91 (digital copy).
- Julius Kraus: Wie die Sprenung des Tunnels Weil am Rhein / Ost – Stetten am 23. April 1945 durch zwei mutige Weiler Bürger verhindert wurde. in: The Markgräflerland, issue 2/1986, p. 93–98.
- Albert Gilsdorf: Die Sanierung des Tüllinger Tunnels bei Weil am Rhein in: Heinisch, Siegmann, Stuchly, Witt (Ed.): Ingenieurbauwerke, PMC Media House, 2001, ISBN 978-3-96245-064-9, p. 30–39.
- Natau, Fecker, Pimentel: Geothechnical Measurements and Modelling, A. A. Balkeman Publishers, 2003, ISBN 90-5809-603-3, p. 56–58. (digitized version)
