= Yener Yörük =

Turkish physician and university professor

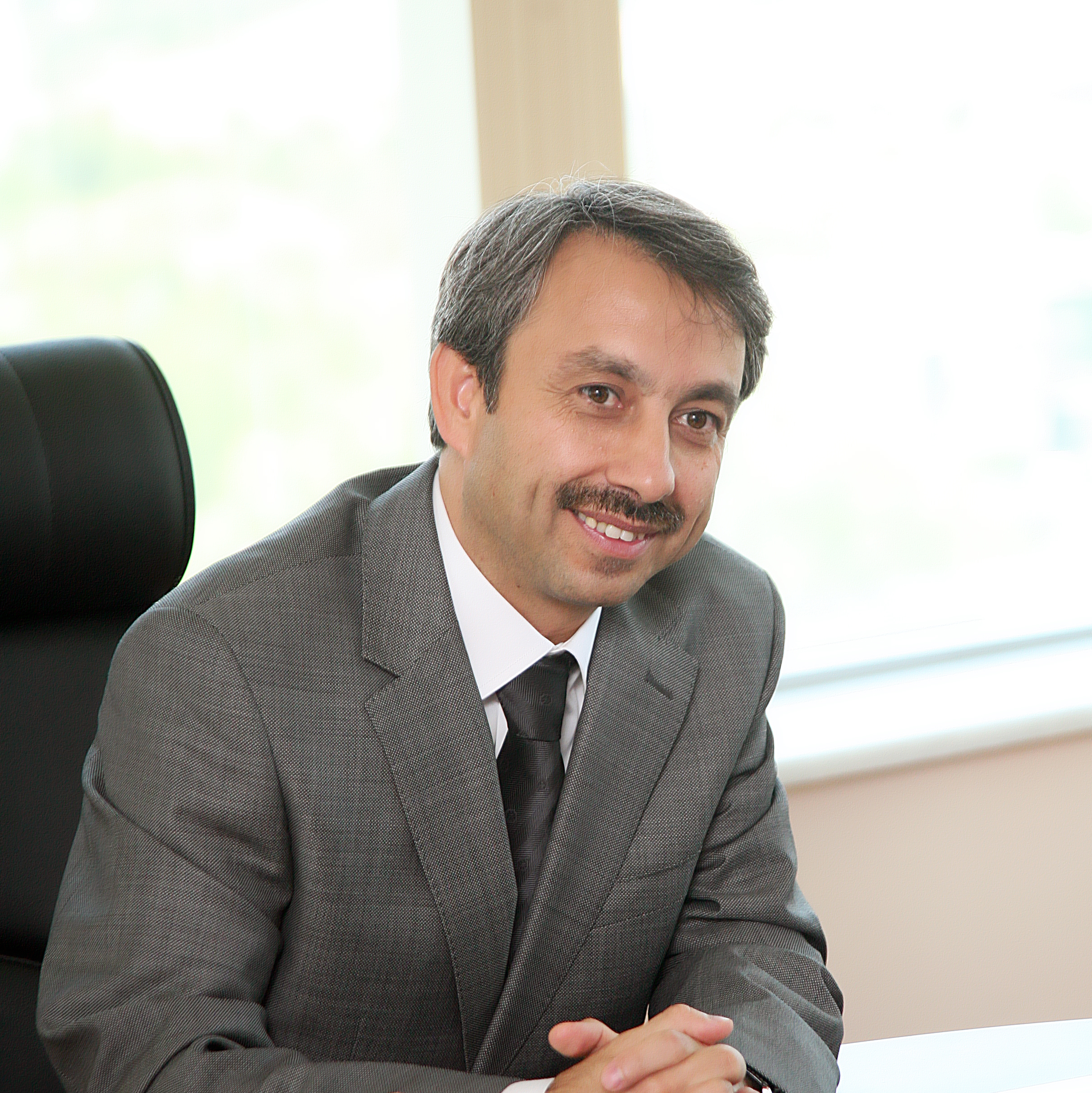
Yener Yörük in 2012

Yener Yörük (born May 25, 1963) is a Turkish physician and university professor. He specializes in thoracic surgery. In 2012–2016, he was Chancellor (Rector) of the Trakya University in Edirne.

== Biography ==
Yörük was born on May 25, 1963 in Manisa. He graduated from Eskişehir Anatolian High School in 1981 and started his undergraduate study in Istanbul Medicine Faculty. After graduating in 1987, he finished one-year compulsory service in Gümüşhane Köse as a practitioner and started residency in the Department of Thoracic Surgery in Faculty of Medicine, Trakya University in 1988.

Within this period, he worked at the Department of Thoracic and Cardiovascular Surgery in Cerrahpaşa Medicine Faculty for 3 years and at Freeman Hospital Regional Cardiothoracic Center (in Newcastle upon Tyne) for one year. Then, he respectively became a Specialist on Thoracic Surgery in Trakya Medicine Faculty in 1993, an assistant professor in the same year, an associate professor in 2001 and professor in 2007.

His administrative duties include being Vice Physician-in-Chief at Trakya University Hospital between 1994 and 1997, Secretary General of Trakya University Foundation between 2005 and 2009, Professor member of the Council of Trakya Medicine Faculty between 2008 and 2011. He has been working as a member of the Administrative Committee of Trakya University since 2008. In 2012–2016, he was Chancellor (Rector) of the Trakya University. Moreover, he has been carrying out the duty of Head of the Department of Thoracic Surgery in the Medicine Faculty since 1993, excluding the years 2004-2007. He worked on lung transplantation and thoracic surgery for a 3-month period in 2011 at Toronto General Hospital, University of Toronto, he has observed the latest developments in the field. He has a total number of 188 publications and papers including 32 in SCI, and 98 international references.

His successor Erhan Tabakoglu was elected and confirmed as Rector of the Trakya University in July 2016.

== Literature ==
- Enver Duran: Challenges of Higher Education Institutions in the Balkans, III Balkan Universities Network Meeting, Trakya Universität Edirne Mai 2010, ISBN 978-975-374-134-7
- Manfred G. Raupp: Lörrach Symposium - Lörrach Sempozyumu, Trakya Universität Edirne Mai 2011, ISBN 978-3-942298-02-5
