= Gözükara =

Gözükara may refer to one of several people:

- Kemal Gözükara (born 1928), Turkish mathematician, businessman and president of the Istanbul Arel University
- Özgür Gözükara (born 1976), Turkish chemist and Chairman of the Board of Trustees of Arel University Istanbul
- Mislina Gözükara (born 1997), Turkish women's football forward
