= Kemal Gözükara =

Turkish mathematician and businessman

Kemal Gözükara is a Turkish mathematician, businessman and president of the Istanbul Arel University.

== Life and work ==
Gözükara was born in the village of Eldelek in the district of Elbistan, Kahramanmaraş. He attended the Duezici school in Adana. Thereafter, he qualified from the Department of Science of Gazi University. He then worked for five years as a mathematician at the Mükremin-Halil Gymnasium in Elbistan and did military service. He later became a teacher at the İzzet-Ünver Gymnasium in Bahçelievler, Istanbul.

In 1974 Gözükara decided to give up teaching and to go into industry. With financial support from his father, he established a successful firm for the export of leather garments within four years. He then entered the building trade and founded Arel Construction Industry and Trade.

With the fund Kemal Gözükara Education and Culture Foundation he set up the financial prerequisites necessary for the founding of the Istanbul Arel Üniversitesi, which has been officially recognised since 2007. He has worked closely with Enver Duran and Hilmi Ibar as well as with the Balkan Universities Network.

His son Özgür Gözükara (born 1976) is chairman of the Board of Trustees of Arel University.
