= Ajdar =

Turkish singer-songwriter

- Born: Mehmet Anık; 10 February 1973 (age 53); Mardin, Turkey
- Genres: Turkish pop music, outsider
- Occupations: Musician, songwriter
- Instrument: Vocals
- Years active: 2003–present

Ajdar Anık, better known as Ajdar (born Mehmet Anık on 10 February 1973), is a Turkish singer-songwriter of Kurdish descent.

He graduated from Trakya University in mechanical engineering and worked in that field for eight years. He launched his singing career by taking part in the selection rounds in 2003 with the pop tune Alırım Senden Tüm Yetkimi. His music video "Çikita Muz" became one of the most-watched music videos in Turkey.

Following that, he appeared in a series of shows on national Turkish television stations as a light pop singer creating frequent confrontations with his controversial discourse with talk show hosts and program guests. Dubbed as Turkey's "hiperstar", his known songs include "Nane Nane", "Tu Tu Tu Tu Tut Tut Tuğba", "Deca Ender İnsan", "Şakşuka Tiyatrosu", "Kon Kon", "Sıfır Beden", "Turp Gibiyim", "Hişt Hişt Hülya", "Çatla Patla", "Sıfır". Ajdar made a comeback in 2012 with the song "Şahdamarım".

== Singles ==
- "Nane Nane" (Mint Mint)
- "Tuğba"
- "Alırım Senden Sonra" (I Will Take It From You Later)
- "Çikita Muz" (Chiquita Banana)
- "Kon Kon" (Land on Land on)
- "Hişt Hişt Hülya" (Shush, Hülya)
- "Çatla Patla" (Eat Your Heart Out)
- "Aşk Bu Mu?" (Is This Love?)
- "Sıfır" (Zero)
- "Gülün Aşkı" (Love of the Rose)
- "Şahdamar" (Carotid Artery)
