= Istanbul Arel University =

Private university in Büyükçekmece, Istanbul, Turkey

Coordinates: 41°03′17″N 28°30′01″E

- İstanbul Arel Üniversitesi
- Type: Private
- Established: 2007
- President: Kemal Gözükara
- Rector: Ersin Göse
- Students: 18,000
- Location: Büyükçekmece, Istanbul, Turkey
- Website: arel.edu.tr/en

Istanbul Arel University (Turkish: İstanbul Arel Üniversitesi) is a private nonprofit university located in Istanbul, Turkey. It was established in 2007 by the Kemal Gözükara Education and Culture Foundation. Teaching is done mostly in English, and there are bachelor, masters and doctoral programmes.

== History ==
Arel College in Istanbul was founded in 1990 and in the course of the following years its educational spectrum was extended with the Arel Pre-School, Arel Primary School, Arel Anatolian High School, Arel Science High School and Arel Sports and Culture Complex. After 26 years the institute sought to further expand its activities to the university level.

With the help of the Kemal Goezükara Education and Culture Foundation it was possible to establish the Istanbul Arel University that was officially recognised by statute No. 2809/5656-Appendix. 76 of 9 May 2007, published in the official gazette No. 26526, of 18 May 2007.

Since 2018 Oezguer Goezuekara (the son of the benefactor) has been chairman of the Board of Trustees of Arel University. He is being helped by Hilmi Ibar to build an international network. In December 2018 an agreement with the DHBW Loerrach was successfully established with the goal of establishing student and professorial exchanges and common educational projects.

The campus of the university is located in Büyükçekmece, Istanbul.

== Faculties ==
The university comprises (2018) the following faculties:

- Medicine, Dean Enver Duran
- Art and Science
- Visual Arts
- Economics and Administrative Science
- Communication
- Engineering Science and Architecture

== Schools ==
- School of Health Sciences
- School of Applied Science
- School of Languages
- Vocational School

== Institute (Masters programmes for graduates and correspondence courses) ==
- Institute of Applied Science
- Institute of Social Science
- Institute of Health Sciences

== Literature ==
- Istanbul Arel University in 100 Questions (Erasmus̟, Europass) Istanbul April 2018
- Enver Duran: Challenges of Higher Education Institutions in the Balkans, III Balkan Universities Network Meeting, Trakya Universität Edirne Mai 2010, ISBN 978-975-374-134-7
