= Hatipler =

Hatipler may refer to the following settlements in Turkey:

- Hatipler, Amasra, a village in Bartın Province
- Hatipler, Bartın, a village in Bartın Province
- Hatipler, Devrek, a village in Zonguldak Province
- Hatipler, Manavgat, a village in Antalya Province

Hatipler is a surname. Notable people with the surname include:

- Mustafa Hatipler, Professor and Rector of the Trakya Üniversiti Edirne
