= Tekirdağ Namık Kemal University =

Public university in Tekirdağ, Turkey

Coordinates: 40°59′39″N 27°34′59″E

- Tekirdağ Namık Kemal Üniversitesi
- Type: Public
- Established: 2006
- Rector: Mümin Şahin
- Students: 30.000
- Location: Tekirdağ, Turkey
- Website: www.nku.edu.tr

University rankings

Regional – Overall
- QS Emerging Europe and Central Asia: 301-350 (2022)

Tekirdağ Namık Kemal University (Turkish: Tekirdağ Namık Kemal Üniversitesi) is a public university in Tekirdağ, Turkey. The university was founded 2006 under the administration of the Trakya University Rectorate Enver Duran. The Faculty of Agriculture, opened in 1982 and the Çorlu Faculty of Engineering was founded in 1992.

The university has eleven faculties, three institutes, twelve vocational schools and a school of health, with nearly 30,000 students, more than 1100 academic staff and 200 administrative staff.

The university is a member of the Balkan Universities Network, and was named after the prominent Turkish nationalist and intellectual Namık Kemal.

== See also ==
- List of universities in Turkey
