= Hagen Pfundner =

German business executive

- Born: 27 October 1960 (age 65); Pforzheim, Germany
- Education: University of Freiburg, University of Kiel
- Occupations: Business executive, pharmacist
- Known for: Managing director of Roche Germany Holding GmbH
- Children: 2

Hagen Pfundner (born 27 October 1960) is a German pharmacist and industrial manager. He is a member of the Board of the Bundesverband der Deutschen Industrie (BDI), the Foundation of German Industries) and the Verband Forschender Arzneimittelhersteller (VFA, German Association of Research-Based Pharmaceutical Companies).

He is also an honorary professor of Freiburg University (Universität Freiburg im Breisgau) and chairman of the University Council of the DHBW Lörrach (Baden-Wuerttemberg Cooperative State University in Loerrach).

== Early life and education ==
Pfunder was born on 27 October 1960 in Pforzheim, Germany. After studying pharmacy at Freiburg University and passing the pharmaceutical exams in 1989, he worked as a scientific assistant at the Universities of Marburg und Kiel. He obtained a Dr. rer. nat. degree with a dissertation entitled "The Involvement of Cytochrome P450 in the Biotransformation of Amidines; Investigation with Purified Enzymes and Antibodies" at the University of Kiel.

== Career ==
Pfunder joined the marketing and product management area of Hoffmann-La Roche AG Germany (1992–1995) and from 1995 to 1998 took on international responsibility for the inflammation and bone disease therapeutic area in Switzerland, then marketing and production in Canada (1998–2001). He then became Global Leader in Virology at the Head Office in Basel, Switzerland (1998–2001) before taking over as management head in Sweden. Since 2001 he has been managing director of Roche Germany Holding GmbH und Head of Roche Pharma AG Germany.

In 2008, Pfundner was appointed to the board of the VFA and was chairman from 2011 until 2017. Since 2011 he has been a member of the board of the Institute of Marketing-Oriented Business Leadership (IMU) at Mannheim University (Universität Mannheim). He is also a member of the board of the BDI and chairman of the BDI Committee for Industrial Health Economy.

The Faculty of Chemistry and Pharmacy of the University of Freiburg in Breisgau has appointed him as their Honorary Professor, and he is also chairman of the University Council of the DHBW Loerrach. Er ist auch Vorsitzender des Hochschulrates der DHBW Lörrach.

== Recognition ==
In 2016, Pfundner was awarded the Baden-Wuerttemberg Business Medal by minister Nicole Hoffmeister-Kraut.
