= Birgül Erken =

Record-holder Turkish female freediver

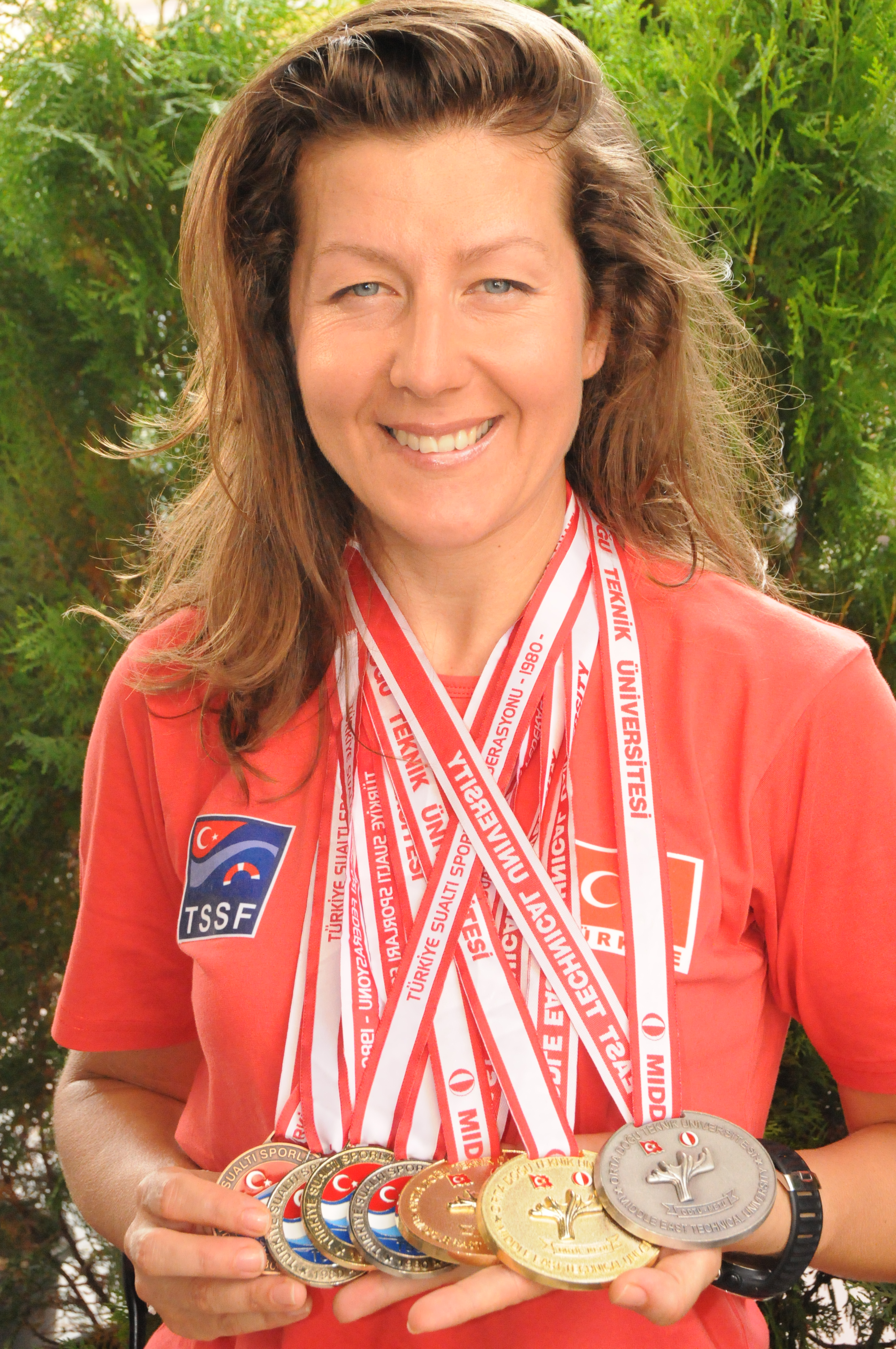
- Turkish Freediving Champion Birgül Erken

Personal information
- Born: 9 February 1972 Çanakkale, Turkey

Sport
- Sport: Freediving
- Club: ITU – SAS

Birgül Erken (born 9 February 1972 in Çanakkale) is a Turkish champion free diver, national representative and an underwater model. She is a holder of multiple records in various freediving disciplines.

Erken completed her graduate program (Turkish language and literature) in Trakya University in Edirne. She then pursued another degree in photography and video at Anadolu University. Since 2017, Birgül Erken has been teaching Turkish language and literature at Canakkale Industrial Vocational High School.

Since 2011, Birgül Erken represents Turkey in a national uniform. Coached by her husband, Mr. Değer Erken, and supported by Istanbul Technical University Sports Club, she continues to train and develop in a systematic manner. Together with her husband, Erken also participates in Underwater Photography competitions.

In 2013, Birgül Erken won a bronze medal in Speed Apnea at the CMAS World Free Diving Championship held in Kazan and managed to find her place among the world's most renowned free divers.

== Career ==
2016

On 18 January 2016, Birgül Erken prepared a special underwater show in Istanbul Aquarium where she held her breath for 5 minutes while performing various activities.

2015

During the CMAS World Freediving Championship in Ischia Island in Italy, Birgul Erken won a bronze medal. In 2015, Brigul Erken competed in 6 different freediving disciplines and won a total of 5 gold and 1 silver medal.

== Galeri ==
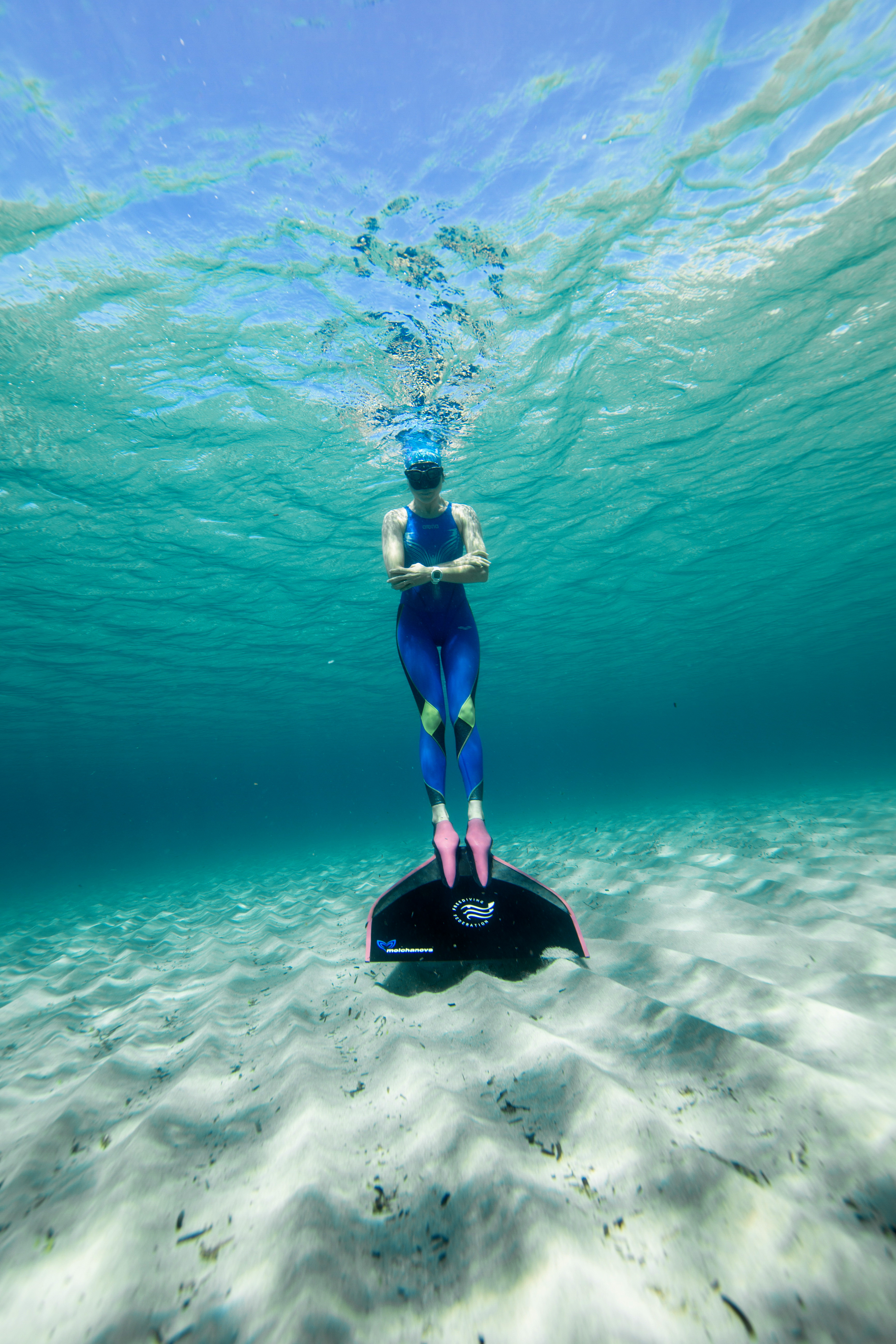
Birgül Erken

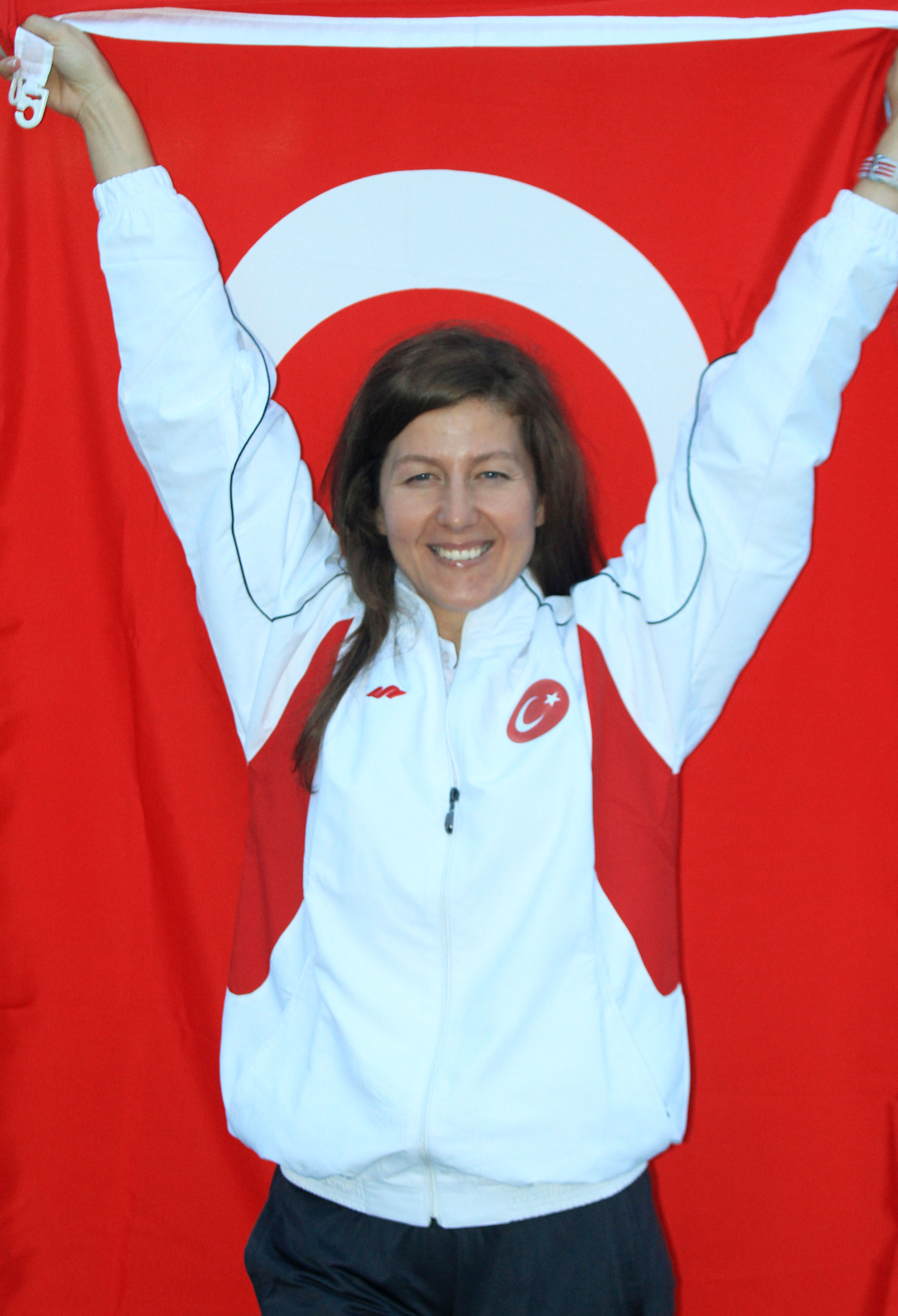
Birgül Erken

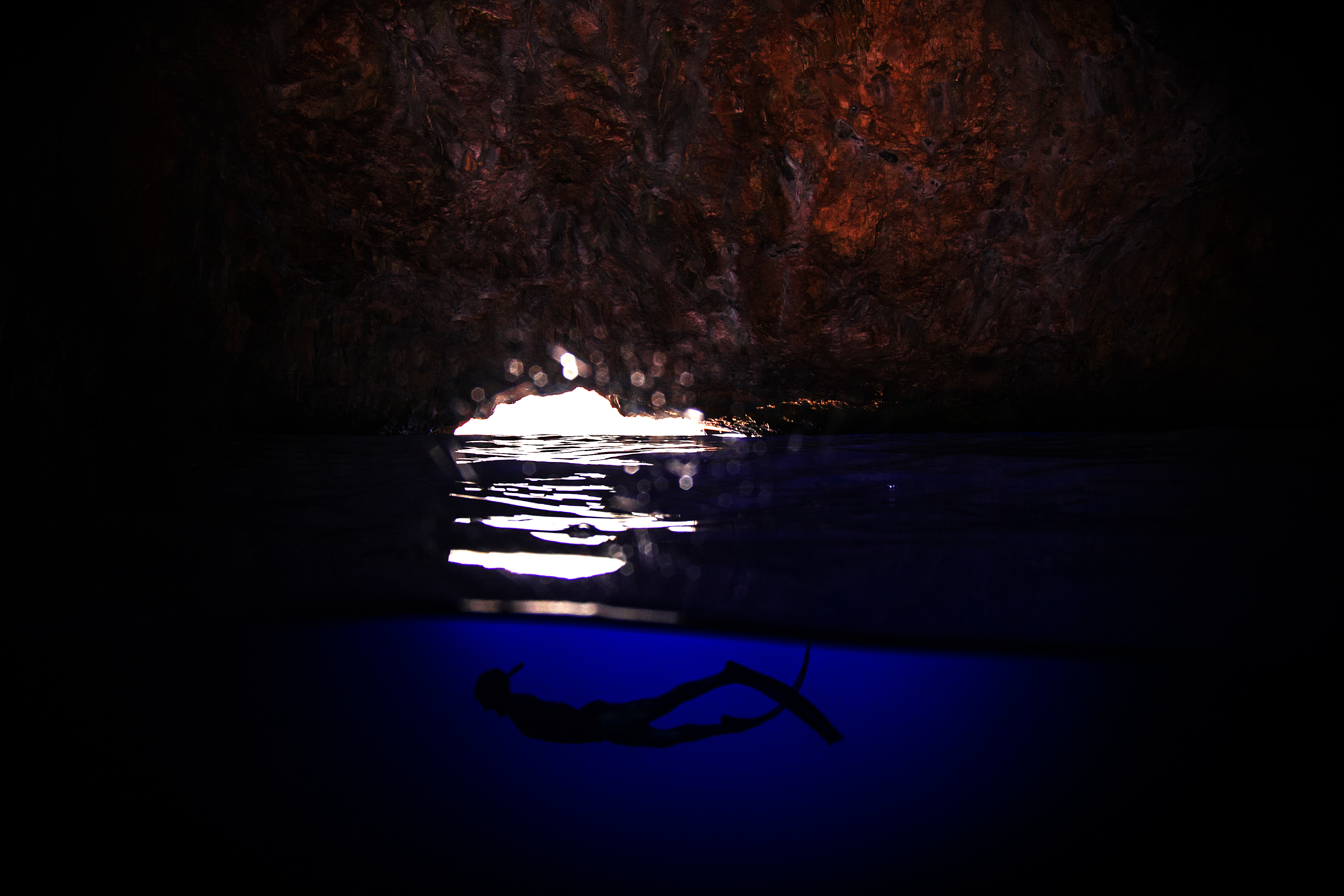
Birgül Erken
