= Recep Gürkan =

Turkish politician (born 1964)

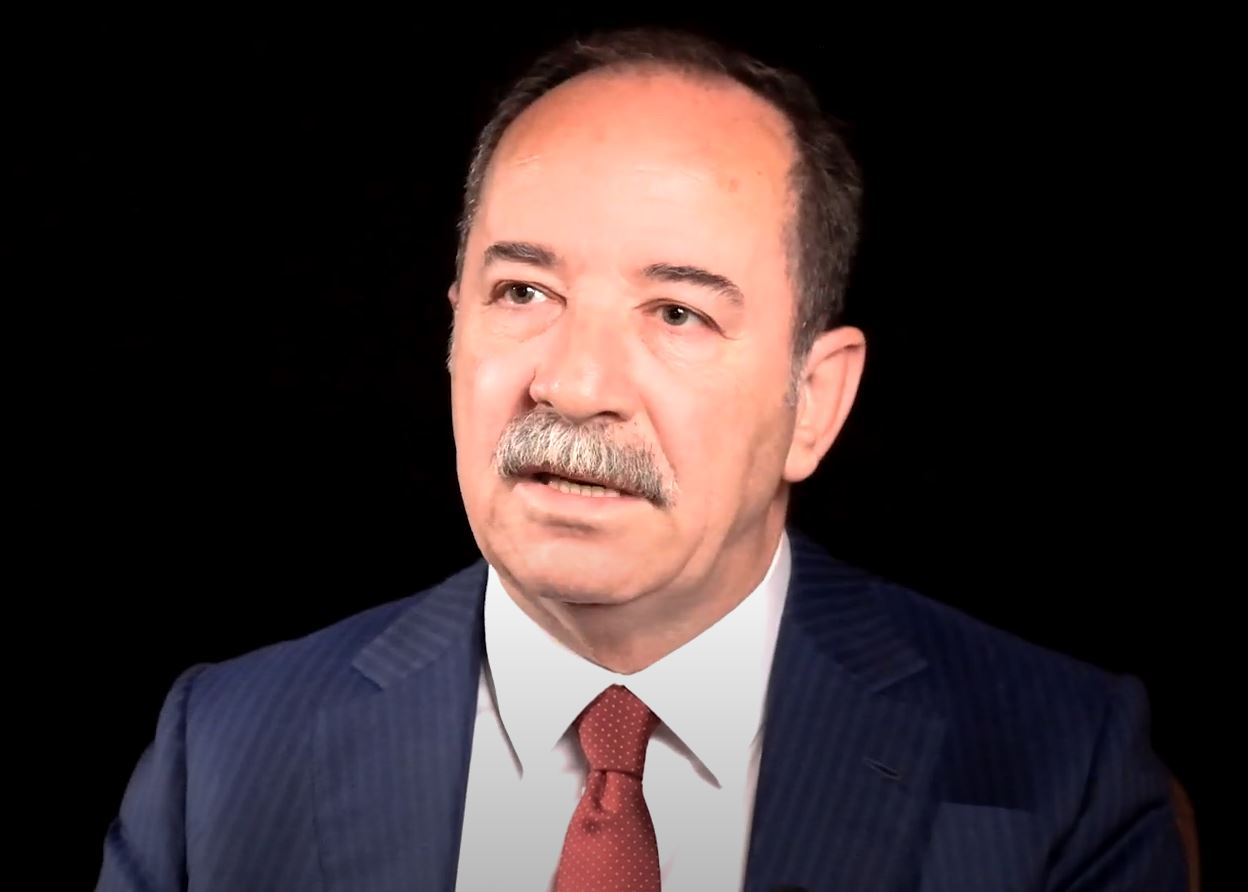
Recep Demir Gürkan

Recep Demir Gürkan (born 1 August 1964) is a Turkish politician and member of the CHP. He was previously a member of the Grand National Assembly and served as the mayor of Edirne between 30 March 2014 and March 2024.

== Life and work ==
He was born in İpsala, Edirne Province. After finishing school, Gürkan continued his studies at Trakya University in Edirne and the Anadolu University in Eskişehir. He graduated from the Faculty of Social Science, Department of Administration. Following his studies, Gürkan worked as a teacher and headmaster at various Turkish schools, and was later given the position of vice-director of the National Education Directorate in Edirne.

He was also given positions at the Coordination Directorate for Planning in Istanbul and the Thrace Development Association. Gürkan also led the management of the Regional Technology Development Firm Techno Inc. and was a member of the Kemalist Working Group for the Future and Modern Life in Turkey. He became General Secretary of Trakya University during the time when Enver Duran was president of the university.

Gürkan was elected to the Turkish parliament in 2011 but had to give up his seat when he stood as a mayoral candidate in Edirne during the 2014 Turkish local elections. He was duly elected as mayor on 30 March 2014. and was re-elected in March 2019. He has maintained relationships with the twin town Lörrach since his time at Trakya University.

He was able to successfully defend his office in the 2019 local elections. He did not stand for election on March 31, 2024 his party colleague Filiz Gencan Akın was elected as his successor.

Gürkan is married and currently resides in Edirne with his spouse and two children.
