= Baden-Wuerttemberg Cooperative State University Loerrach =

University in Germany

Coordinates: 47.6173°N 7.6772°E

- Type: Public
- Established: 1981/2009
- Rector: Prof. Dr. Stefan Hess
- Undergraduates: 2,000
- Location: Lörrach, Baden-Württemberg, Germany
- Website: www.dhbw-loerrach.de

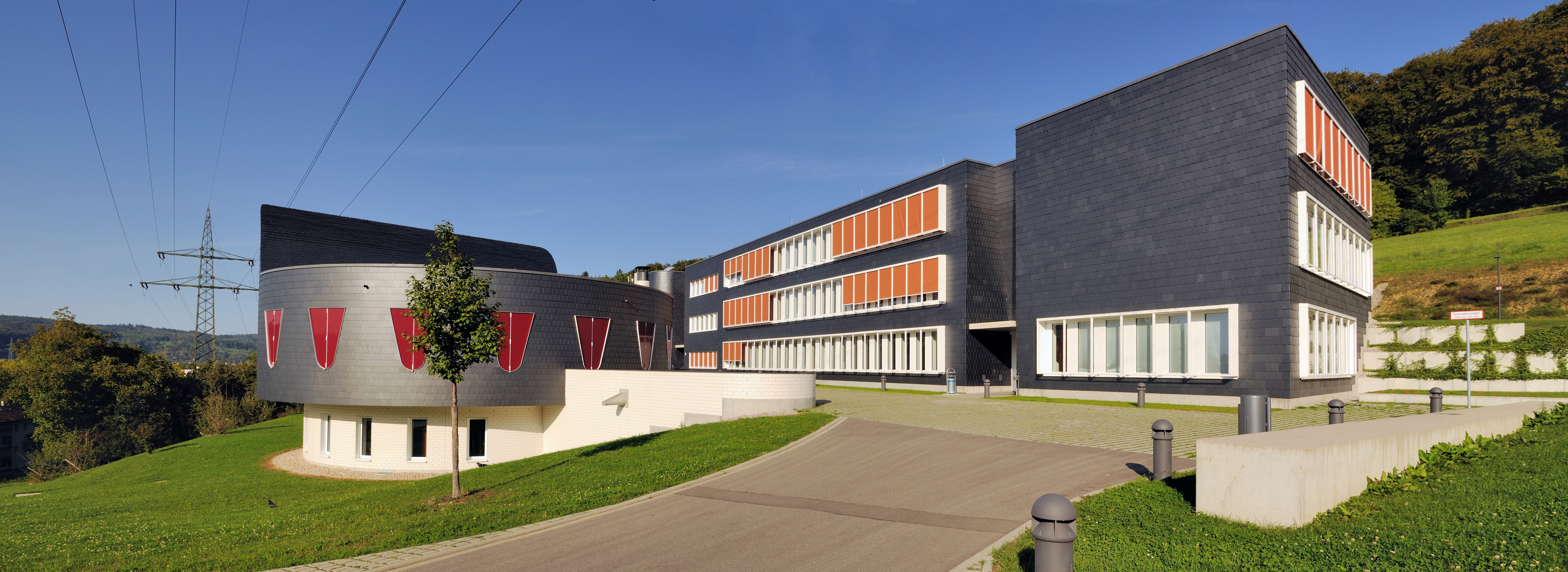
Building of Cooperative State University Loerrach

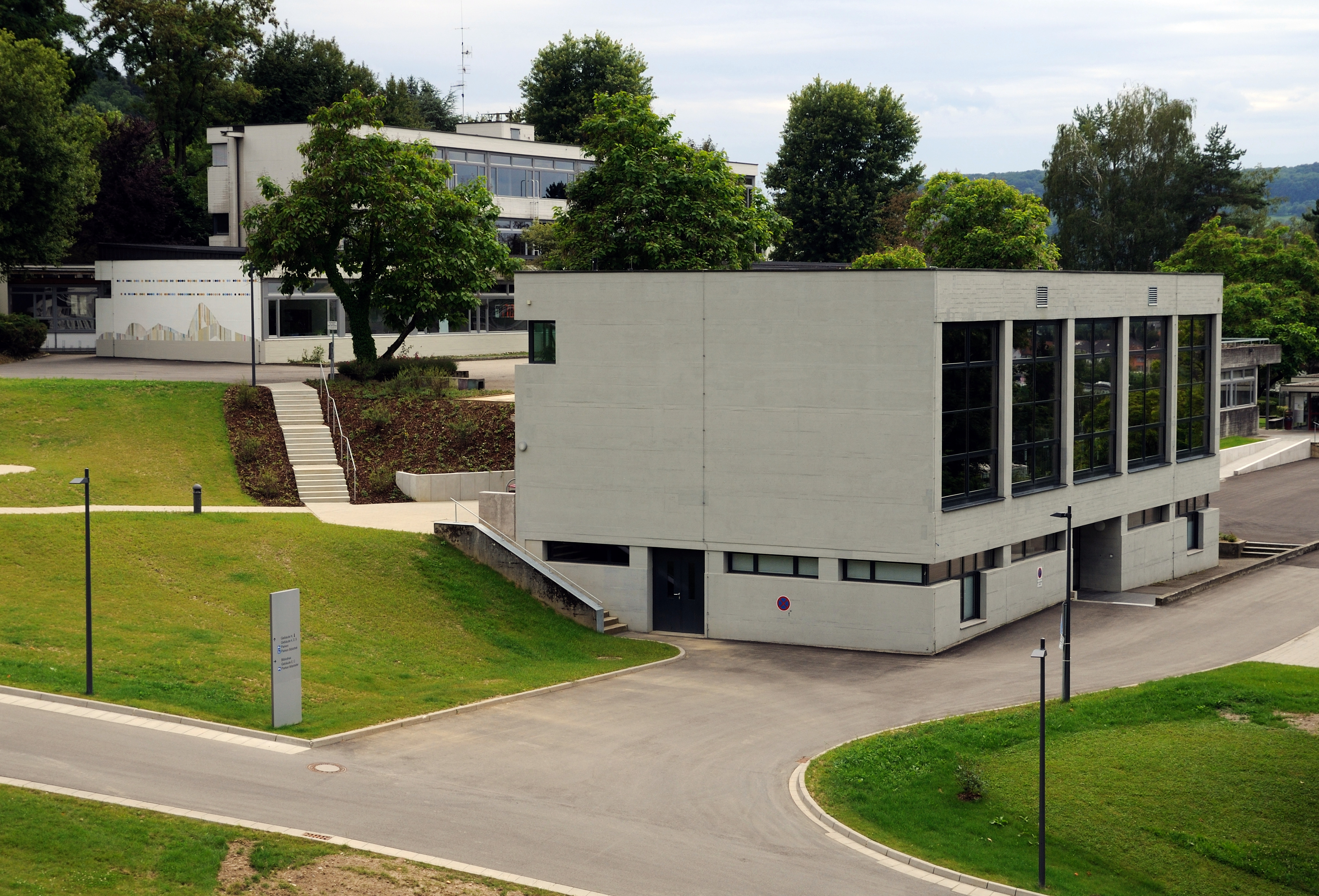
Library (right)

The Baden-Wuerttemberg Cooperative State University Loerrach (DHBW-Loerrach) was founded in 1981 as Berufsakademie Lörrach. It offers workplace-focused, cooperative degree courses. This means that students alternate between learning the theory at school and applying it on the job in a three-months rhythm. Besides Loerrach, seven other schools of cooperative education and three branch campuses were founded in Baden-Wuerttemberg since the beginning of 1974.

The German state of Baden-Wuerttemberg has changed the school's legal status on March 1, 2009. The union of the merged eight institutions with 11 campuses is now named Baden-Württemberg Cooperative State University. It is a legal entity of public law and simultaneously a state institution. By 2009 the combined student enrollment across all 11 campuses had reached more than 25,000 students. More than 90,000 graduated alumni have been educated in more than 8,000 cooperating companies.

About 2,000 students are enrolled at the DHBW Loerrach. It runs a faculty of business and a faculty of engineering and offers 17 different business and technical fields of study. All programs are intensive and full-time degree courses (accredited with 210 ECTS).

In most of the courses students graduate after three years with one of the following degrees:

- Bachelor of Engineering (B.Eng.)
- Bachelor of Arts (B.A.)
- Bachelor of Science (B.Sc.)

Master courses offered in

- Health Care Management
- Human Resource Management
- Logistics Management
- Business Management (Start October 2011)

The DHBW Loerrach - situated in the triangle between Germany, Switzerland and France – offers two trinational courses in cooperation with the Université de Haute Alsace in Colmar and Mulhouse and the UASN-Switzerland in Basel and Muttenz. Students graduate from these courses after three and a half years and receive a degree from all three participating schools. The lectures are held in German, French and English.

The DHBW Loerrach cooperates with the Steinbeis Foundation Stuttgart and the following international universities:

- Africa
  - Durban University of Technology, South Africa
  - Cape Peninsula University of Technology, South Africa
  - Vaal University of Technology, South Africa
- North America
  - Georgian College Toronto, Canada
  - University of Ottawa, Canada
  - University of Victoria, Canada
  - University of Waterloo, Canada
  - Northwestern Michigan College, USA
  - University of California, Santa Barbara USA
- Asia
  - Beijing Wuzi University, China
  - TEDC Bandung, Indonesia
- Australia
  - Royal Melbourne Institute of Technology, Australia
- Europe
  - University of Cergy-Pontoise, France
  - Université de Haute-Alsace, France
  - INSEEC Bordeaux, France
  - Institute of Technology Tralee, Ireland
  - Università dell’Insubria Varese / Como, Italy
  - Polytechnic University of the Marches Ancona, Italy
  - Savonia Polytechnic, Kuopio, Finland
  - Ventspils College, Latvia
  - Hogeschool Zeeland, Vlissingen, Netherlands
  - FH Joanneum Graz, Austria
  - The Polish Open University Warsaw, Poland
  - Poznan School of Banking, Poland
  - Politehnica University of Timișoara, Romania
  - University of Applied Sciences Northwestern Switzerland
  - Europäische Wirtschaftsakademie Madrid, Spain
  - Universidad de Castilla-La Mancha Albacete, Spain
  - Universidad Europea de Madrid, Spain
  - Brno University of Technology, Czech Republic
  - Trakya University, Edirne, Turkey
  - Széchenyi István University Györ, Hungary
  - Istanbul Arel University, Turkey

The school is a member in the World Association for Cooperative Education (WACE), the World Universities Congress and in the Balkan Universities Network.

== Notable professors and alumni ==
- Hagen Pfundner (born 1960), German pharmacist and Chairman of the Board of DHBW Loerrach
- Theodor Sproll (born 1957), German economist and former Rector of the DHBW-Loerrach
