= Hilmi İbar =

Chemist, Pedagogue

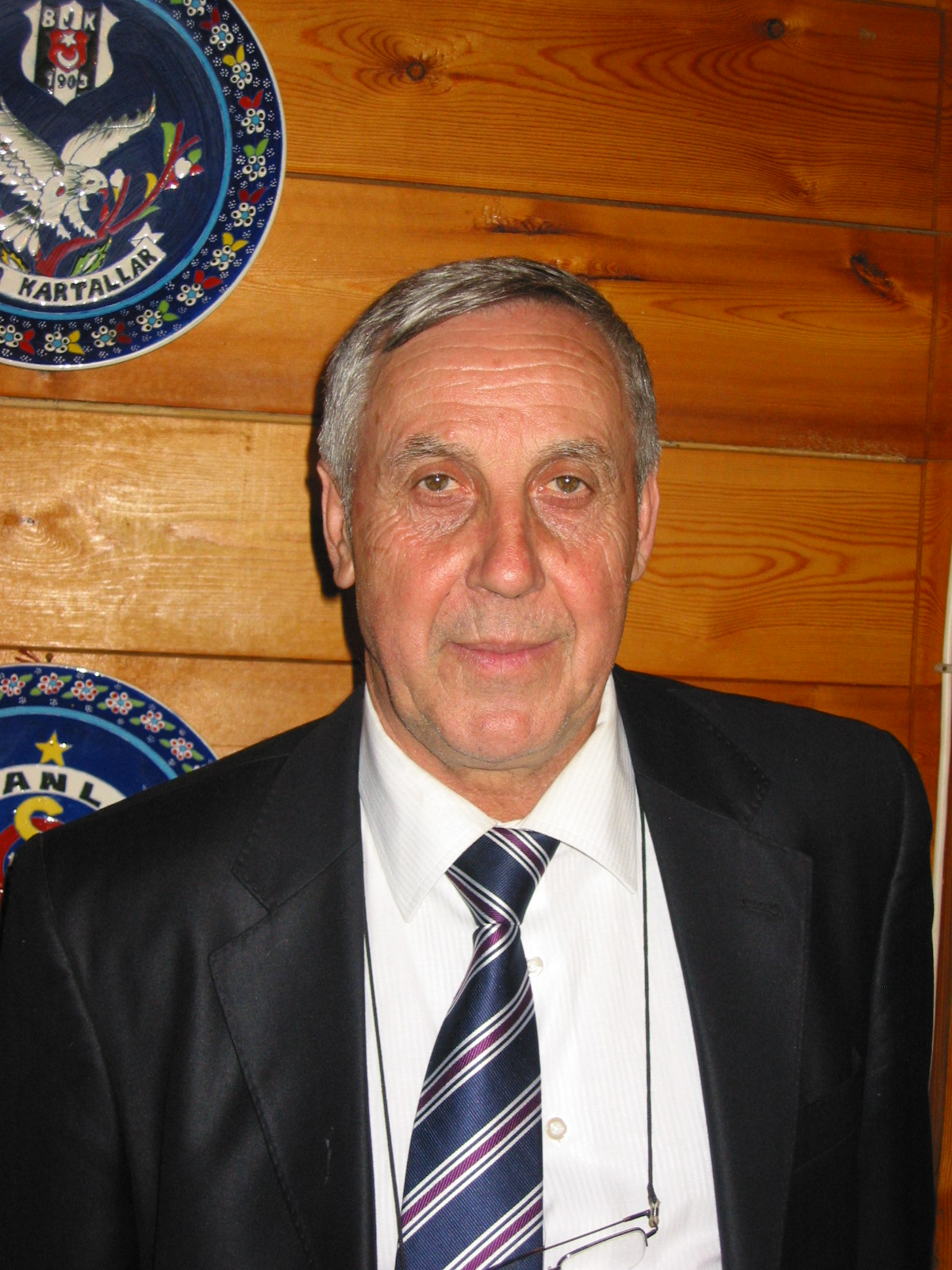
Hilmi Ibar (2011)

Hilmi İbar (Serbian Cyrillic: Хилми Ибар) (born July 31, 1947, in Gnjilane, FPR Yugoslavia) is professor of chemistry, former dean of the pedagogic faculty and former head of the International Office at the Trakya University in Edirne. He is also vice president of the Balkan Universities Network.

== Biography ==
Hilmi Ibar received his BSi in chemistry at the University of Pristina in 1970, his MSi and doctorate after education at Aston University and the University of Missouri–Kansas City at the University of Zagreb 1978 and 1984. He was lecturer (1974) and associate professor (1980) in chemistry at the Pristina University. Since 1996 he is professor for chemistry at the Trakya University Edirne and dean of the faculty pedagogic science 2005–2012. Hilmi Ibar is additionally engaged in different international education projects. Ibar is international advisor of Recep Gürkan, mayor of Edirne, since 2014 and rector Erhan Tabakoglu since his election 2016.

== Publications ==
- Articles published in international periodicals:
  - İbar A, KamberiB. İbar O and Ahmetİ, "Determination of Gold in Pb-Zn Sulphide ores and Flotation Products using Flameless AAS", Bulletin of Chemist and Technologist of Kosovo, Vıll, Nol, (43), Pristina, Yugoslavia, 1981.
  - İbar AH. and Z. Krijeştorac"Neutron Activation Analysis of some rare Metals in Lead and Zinc Ores" Açta Chimica Kosovica, Vol 7, No 1, Pristina, Yugoslavia, 1987.
  - Şeren, G., Kaplan, M., ibar, H., "A comparative study of human seminal plasma and blood serum trace elements in fertile and infertile men"; Analytical Letters, 35(11), 1785-1794 (2002)
  - Aktaş, Y.K., İbar, H., Preconcentration of some trace elements on bentonite modified with trioctyl phosphine oxide, Fresenius Environmental Bulletin (FEB), Vol. 13, No.2; 2004.
  - Aktaş, Y.K., İbar, H., Extraction of Fe(III), Sb(III) and Cd(II) from hydrochloric acid solution with organic extractant in methyl isobutyl ketone, Journal of the Indian Chemical Society, 81, 942–945, 2004.
  - Aktaş, Y.K., İbar, H., Determination of Chromium, Copper, Manganese, Nickel and Zinc by Flame Atomic Absorption Spectrometry After Separation on Bentonite Modified with Trioctylamine, Journal of the Indian Chemical Society", 82, 38–40, 2004.
  - Yıldız KALEBAŞI AKTAŞ, Hilmi İBAR, “Sorption and preconcentration of cadmium, iron and antimony on bentonite modified with trioctylamine”, Fresenius Environmental Bulletin (FEB), Vol.14, No.11, 983–985, 2005.
  - Yıldız KALEBAŞI AKTAŞ, Hilmi İBAR, “The extraction of Zn(II) and Cu(II) from hydrochloric acid solutions by trioctylamine in methyl isobutyl ketone, Isoamyl acetate and diethyl ether ”, Basımda, Revue Roumaine de Chimie Nr. 4, 277-281 2005.
  - Dilek BAKIRCIOĞLU, Hilmi İBAR, “Investigation of trace elements in agricultural soils by BCR sequential extraction method and its transfer to wheat plants” Environmental Monitoring and Assessment (in press 2010).
  - Dilek BAKIRCIOĞLU, Yasemin BAKIRCIOĞLU, Hilmi İBAR “Comparison of one-step single extraction procedures with sequential extraction procedure for assessing the bioavailability of soil metals to wheat grains” CLEAN- Soil Air Water (in press).
  - ZeynepAtay N.G. and İbar H. "İnterfacial Kinetiks in Metal Extraction with Amine Organic Solutions" Turkish Journal of Chemistry, Voll8. No.4, 1994.
- Papers presented at international congress, conference or symposium and published in conference proceedings:
  - İbar A.H. and M. Berisha"Solvent Extraction of Elements with Tricaprylyl Tertiary Amine" Bulletin of Chemist and technologist of Macedonia, 7, Skopje, Yugoslavia, 1989.
  - H. İbar and N. Mutlu, “A New Procedure for the Determination of Bizmuth in Drug Products”. University of Plovdiv “Paisii Hilendarski” publication, Scientific Works, Vol 32, book 5, Chemistry- Bulgaria 2004.
  - D. Bakırcıoğlu, Y. Bakırcıoğlu and H. İbar “Absorption and desorption of some trace elements on rice husk ash” Jubile National Scientific Conference with International Participation, 20 years Union of scientists in Bulgaria Branch Smolyan, Bulgaria, 20–21 October 2006
  - Y Bakırcıoğlu, D. Bakırcıoğlu, and H. İbar “ Determination of heavy metals in agricultural soils by commonly used single extraction procedures” Colloquium Spectroscopium Internationale XXXVI, Budapest-Hungary, August 30-September 3, 2009.
  - D. Bakırcıoğlu, Y. Bakırcıoğlu and H. İbar “Investigation of trace elements in agricultural soils by BCR sequential extraction method and its transfer to wheat plants” Colloquium Spectroscopium Internationale XXXVI, Budapest-Hungary, August 30-September 3, 2009.
  - D. Bakırcıoğlu, Y. Bakırcıoğlu and H. İbar “Comparison of one-step single extraction procedures with sequential extraction procedure for assessing the bioavailability of soils metals to wheat grains” European Symposium on Atomic Spectrometry – ESAS 2010 in Wroclaw Polan, 5–8 September 2010-Wroclaw University of Technology.
  - K. Sezer, H. İbar. Determination of Disperse Azo Dyes in Industrial Textile Wastewater American Chemical Society. The 61st Northwest Regional Meeting (June 25–28, 2006) Reno, Nevada. U.S.A
  - K. Sezer, H. İbar. Decolorization of the Azo Dye Reactive Orange 16 by Fenton Oxidation 6’th Chemistry Conference (20–22 June 2007) Plovdiv, Bulgaria.
- Papers presented at national congress, conference or symposium and published in conference proceedings:
  - Kamberi B. İbarA.H. Ahmet İ and İbar O. "The Chemical Contents of Alkaline Wastewater from Selective Flotation of Pb-Zn ores and its Use", Appropriate waste Management for Developing Countries, Edited by Kriton Curi, İstanbul, Türkiye. 1982
  - Kamberi B. İbarAH. Ahmet İ and İbar O. "Selective Flotation of Pyrite from Lead and Zinc Ores with Various Collectors using Acisic Waste Mine waters" Environmental Technology for Developing Countries, 25–31 July, İstanbul, 1982.
  - İbar A.H., Bejtulahu B., Djeli A, and Bajrami S. "Study of pollution in the Region of Titova Mitrovica" Environmental Management for Developing Countries, 25–31 July, İstanbul, Turkey, 1984.
  - Bejtulahu B., İbar A.H., Djeli A. and Bajrami S. "The Effect of Air Pollution on the Flora and Fauna in the Region of Titova Mitrovica." Environmental Management for Developing Countries, 25–31 July, İstanbul, Turkey, 1984.
  - Y Bakırcıoğlu, D. Bakırcıoğlu, and H. İbar “Kontamine ve kontamine olmayan topraklarda eser element konsantrasyonunun ICP-OES ile tayini” XI Ulusal Spektroskopi Kongresi, 34, Ankara, 2009.
  - D. Bakırcıoğlu, Y. Bakırcıoğlu and H. İbar “Edirne ili ve köylerinde tarımsal topraklarda bulunan ve bu topraklarda yetişsen buğdaylarda bazı eser elementlerin ardışık ekstraksiyon yöntemi kullanılarak tayini”, XI Ulusal Spektroskopi Kongresi, 35, Ankara, 2009.
