= Theodor Sproll =

German social scientist, economist and rector

Theodor Karl Sproll (born 27 January 1957 in Constance, Germany) is a German social scientist and economist and rector of the Baden-Wuerttemberg Cooperative State University Loerrach since 2013.

== Biography ==
After his school matriculation in Constance he did his National Service in Tank Regiment 294 in Stetten am kalten Markt and studied Social and Administrative Science at Constance University (1972–1982). From 1981 he was concurrently an employee of the Institute for Social- and Economic Science at the same university.

In 1985, as an external employee of the institute, he took earned a doctorate in Economic Science with the theme "Drug Lists and Cost Containment". From 2003 to 2005 he undertook further studies in various programmes at the Harvard Business School in Boston, where he is an Alumnus (AMP). After working in positions with Ciba-Geigy AG Basel (1982–1987), Hoffmann-La Roche AG, Grenzach-Wyhlen (1989–1998) and as director of Novartis-Germany in Nuremberg (1999–2002) he was elected to the board of Novartis Pharma AG Switzerland, latterly as head of global market access.

In 2007 Theodor Sproll was appointed professor, 2009 dean of the Faculty of Economics and 2013 rector of the Baden-Wuerttemberg Cooperative State University Loerrach.

He is married to Brigitte Sproll, with whom he has a son and a daughter.

== Activities at the Loerrach University ==
- Development and positioning of the BWL Health Management course: compilation of concepts, description of modules, acquiring education partners and lecturers.
- Emphasis of his teaching activities: marketing and sales, competitive strategy, branding, negotiation.
- Supervision of general studies with colleagues; Contribution to the Centre for Contact Studies.
- Lecturer within the framework of the Erasmus programme.
- Leader of the Central Working Group Health Science of the DHBW.
- Appointed vice-rector and dean of the Faculty of Economics at the Baden-Wuerttemberg Cooperative State University Loerrach.
- Elected rector of the university in March 2013 and reelected July 2019.
