= Mustafa Hatipler =

Mustafa Hatipler (born November 24, 1959 in Edirne) is a Turkish professor of social policy at Trakya Üniversitesi in Edirne. He was appointed as the new rector of the university on August 16, 2024. He is the successor in office to the former rector Erhan Tabakoglu.
