= Enver Duran =

Turkish doctor (born 1945)

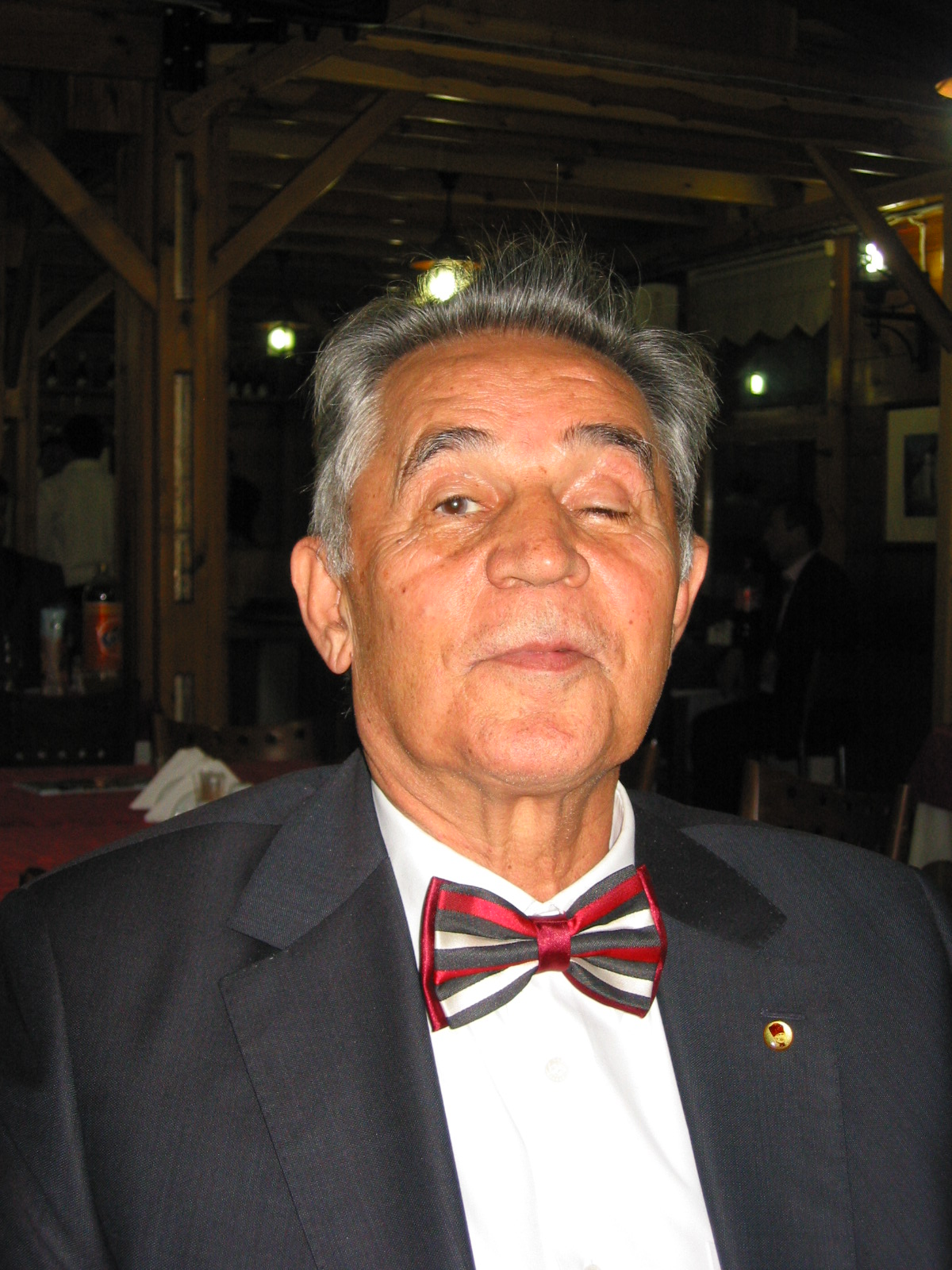
Enver Duran, 2011

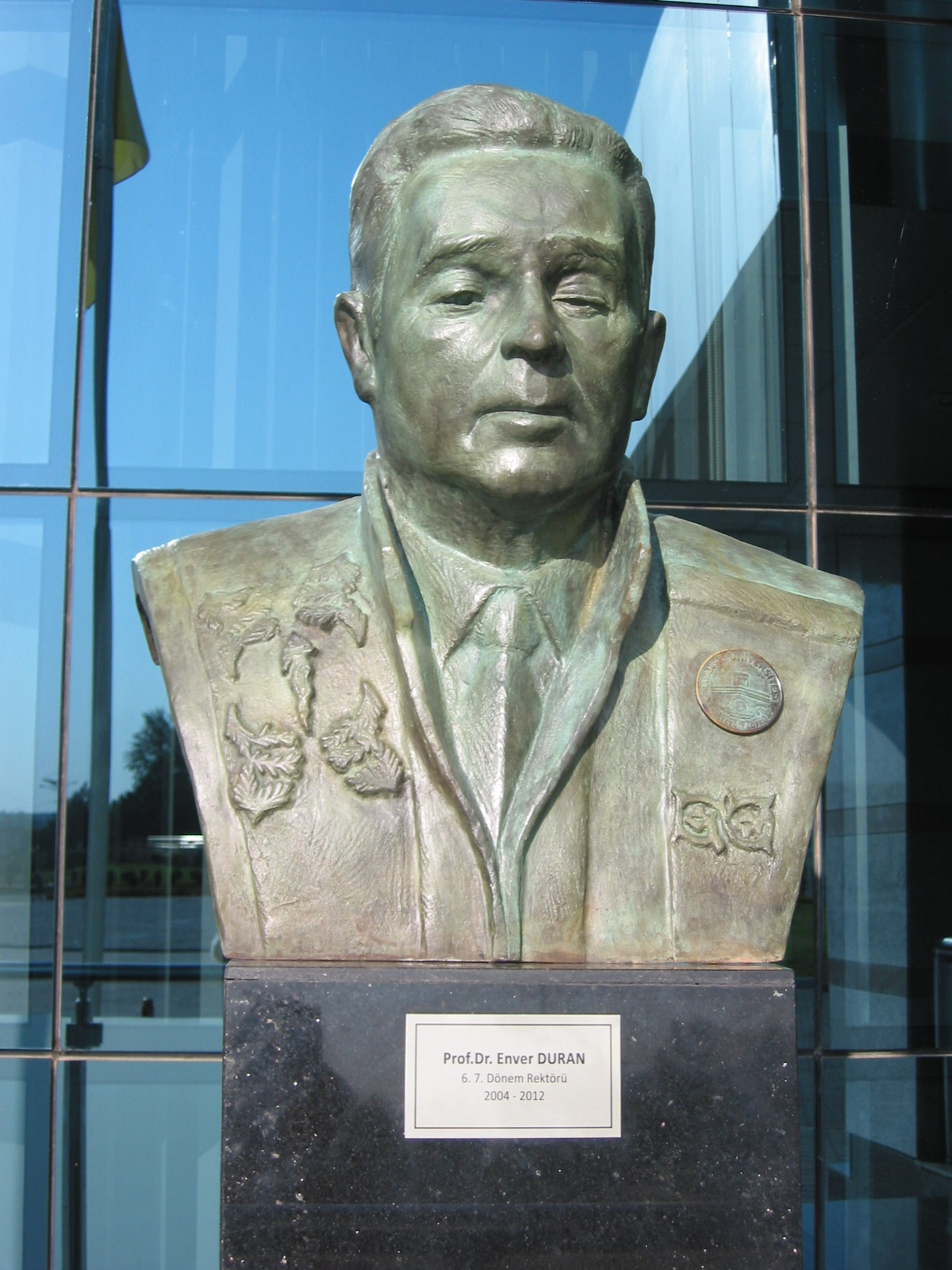
Memorial bust of Enver Duran

Enver Duran (born June 19, 1945, in Bursa) is a Turkish doctor specialising in thoracic-cardiovascular surgery; a professor and chancellor of Trakya University, Edirne (2004–2012); and since 2013, dean of the faculty of medicine of Istanbul Arel University.

== Biography ==
His education began at Bursa Reşit Pasha Primary School in 1951-1956 followed by Bursa Osmangazi Secondary School in 1956-1960 and Bursa High School for Boys in 1960–1963. After his education in Ankara University Faculty of Medicine in 1963, he received a bachelor's degree in 1969. Duran worked as an Intern Doctor in Gülhane Military Medical Academy (GMMA) in 1970, then, he became a chief doctor in 1971–1973 in İzmir Military Dispensary and worked as an Assistant in Ankara Gülhane Military Medical Academy General Surgery Department in 1973–1977. After he completed his General Surgery Specialization education in 1977–1980, he became a Specialist in Thoracic-Cardiovascular Surgery and an assistant professor in the same academy. On 16 April 1985 he got associated professorship degree from Hacettepe University Medical Faculty Thoracic-Cardiovascular Surgery and assigned as an associated professor.

Between the years 1985-1990 he worked as an associated professor in Gülhane Military Medical Academy Thoracic-Cardiovascular Surgery and in May 1990 having received Professorship Degree he was assigned as a professor.

He became the Clinic Director of Cardiovascular Surgery, Gülhane Military Medical Academy, Haydarpasha Training and Application Hospital from 1990 to 1998 and the Chairmanship of Trakya University Department of Cardiovascular Surgery from 1998 to 2004.

Assigned as a Rector of Trakya University in 2004, Prof. Dr. Enver Duran was elected President of Interuniversity Board in Turkey in 55th Interuniversity Board Meeting which was held on 28 July 2006 in Edirne.

Assigned as a deputy rector of Namık Kemal University on 18 August 2006, Duran carried on this task until a rector of this university was assigned on 17 May 2007. He was assigned as a deputy rector of Kırklareli University on 11 June 2007 and completed this task in 2008.

Duran's rectorial incumbency ended in 2008 and he was re-elected for one more term from 2008 to 2012. Elected by Interuniversity Board, Duran has been serving as a President of Turkish Medical Council.

He is married to Ayse Mine Duran. He has two children and lives in Edirne.

== Professional career ==
- 1969–1990; Specialist for Thoracic Cardiovascular Surgery at Gülhane Military Medical Academy Ankara as Assistant Professor (1980–1985) and Associate Professor (1985–1990),
- Work experience at Cleveland Clinic Ohio USA, coronary bypass surgery (1982); Guy Hospital London England, aorto-coronary bypass surgery (1987) (two terms); Royal Brompton Hospital London England, re-do aorto coronary bypass surgery (1988); Edinburgh Scotland, aorto-coronary bypass surgery (1988).
- Professor, Clinic Director and Chairmanship of Department of Surgery Sciences and Cardiovascular Surgery at Gülhane Military Medical Academy, Haydarpasha Training and Application Hospital and College of Nurses Ankara (1990–1998).
- 1998–2012; Professor and Chairmanship of Cardiovascular Surgery at Trakya University Edirne.
- 2004–2012; The Rector of Trakya University and
  - Chairman of the Inter-University Committee Turkey (2006–2007);
  - Rector of the Namik Kemal University (2006–2007);
  - Rector of the Kirklareli University (2007–2008).
  - President of the Interuniversity Board Medicine-Health Sciences Education Council of Turkey since 2008.
  - President of the Balkan Universities Network Conference 2010.
  - Vice-president of the World Universities Congress 2010.
- Since 2013 Dean of the Fakulty medicine at Istanbul Arel Universitesi

== Publications ==
- National books and papers
  - Kitap Editörü, Kalp ve Damar Cerrahisi Kitabı, Çapa Tıp Kitabevi, İstanbul, 2004
  - Halıcı Ü. Dünyada Kalp Damar Cerrahisinin Tarihçesi, Kalp ve Damar Cerrahisi, Çapa Tıp Kitabevi, İstanbul, 2004
  - Edis M. Kardiyovasküler Fizyoloji, Kalp ve Damar Cerrahisi, Çapa Tıp Kitabevi, İstanbul, 2004
  - Çalışan Kalpte Koroner Revaskülarizasyon, Kalp ve Damar Cerrahisi, Çapa Tıp Kitabevi, İstanbul, 2004
  - Ege T, Yüksel V. Minimal İnvaziv Kalp Cerrahisi, Kalp ve Damar Cerrahisi, Çapa Tıp Kitabevi, İstanbul, 2004
- Papers published in national journals (selection 10 / 124)
  - Çıkırıkçıoğlu M, Sunar H, Ege T, Canbaz S, Edis M, Özalp B, Duran E. İzole radial ya da ulnar arter yaralanmalarına yaklaşımda cerrahi ikilem: Tamir- ligasyon. Damar Cerrahisi Dergisi 2002; 11: 122–8.
  - Us MH, Pekediz A, Süngün M, İnan K, Çağlı K, Yıldırım Ş, Duran E, Öztürk ÖY. İnternal torasik arterin hazırlanmasında vazodilator ilaçlar gerçekten gerekli mi? Türk Göğüs Kalp Damar Cerrahisi Dergisi 2003; 11: 5–8.
  - Ege T, Canbaz S, Us MH, Sunar H, Çıkırıkçıoğlu M, Arar C, Yüksel V, Duran E. Kalp cerrahisi ve akut respiratuar distress sendromu. Haydarpaşa Kardiyoloji ve Kardiyovasküler Cerrahi Bülteni 2003; 11: 18–24.
  - Ege T, Canbaz S, Çıkırıkçıoğlu M, Arar C, Edis M, Duran E. Kalp Cerrahisinde Ameliyat Öncesi Solunum Fonksiyon Testlerinin Önemi. Haydarpaşa Kardiyoloji ve Kardiyovasküler Cerrahi Bülteni 2003; 11:66-75
  - Ege T, Canbaz S, Us MH, Çıkırıkçıoğlu M, Arar C, Edis M, Duran E. Açık Kalp Cerrahisinde Ameliyat Öncesi Heparin Kullanımının Ameliyat Sonrası Drenaja Etkisi. Haydarpaşa Kardiyoloji ve Kardiyovasküler Cerrahi Bülteni 2003; 11:90-96
  - Canbaz S, Ege T, Halıcı Ü, Duran E. Raynaud Fenomeni. Türkiye Klinikleri Kalp Damar Cerrahisi Dergisi 2004; 5:49-58
  - Taşkıran A, Eskiocak S, Ege T, Duran E, Gülen Ş. Koroner Bypass Operasyonlarında Miyokard Doku Hasarının ve Oksidan Stresin Araştırılması. Türk Biyokimya Dergisi 2004; 29:193-198
  - Taşkıran A, Eskiocak S, Çıkırkçıoğlu M, Ege T, Duran E. Koroner Arter Bypass Cerrahisi Öncesindeki Plazma Total Antioksidan Kapasite Düzeylerinin İskemi-Reperfüzyon Hasarı ile İlişkisi. Trakya Üniversitesi Tıp Fakültesi Dergisi 2005; 22:16-22
  - Edis M, Ege T, Duran E. Venöz Cut-down Komplikasyonu: Bir Olguda Ven İçinde Kalan Kateterin Migrasyonu. Trakya Üniversitesi Tıp Fakültesi Dergisi 2005; 22:102-105
  - Duran E, Sunar H, Ege T, Canbaz S, Çıkırıkçıoğlu M, Arar C, Halıcı Ü, Çakır H. Off-pump Koroner Bypass Sonuçlarının Değerlendirilmesi: Edirne Deneyimi. Trakya Üniversitesi Tıp Fakültesi Dergisi 2006; 23:4-8
  - Arar C, Çolak A, Alagöl A, Ege T, Duran E, Pamukçu Z. Kardiyopulmoner Baypas Sırasında Kalp Akciğer Pompasına Sevofluran Eklenmesinin Analjezik Tüketimi ve Derlenme Üzerine Etkisi. Göğüs Kalp Damar Anestezi ve Yoğun Bakım Derneği Dergisi 2006; 12:113-118
- Papers published in national symposium and conference proceedings (selection 5 / 125).
  - Yüksel V, Ege T, Canbaz S, Süngün M, Çakır H, Kocailik A, Duran E. Açık Kalp Cerrahisi Sonrası Önemli Bir Komplikasyon: Acil Reoperasyon. Türk Kalp Damar Cerrahisi Derneği 9. Ulusal Kongresi, 1-5 Kasım 2006, Antalya
  - Ege T, Arar C, Çolak A, Çakır H, Duran E. Çalışan Kalpte Mitral Kapak Replasmanı Rutin Olarak Uygulanabilir mi? XXII. Ulusal Kardiyoloji Kongresi, 24-28 Kasım 2006, ANTALYA
  - Ege T, Canbaz S, Gurkan S, Ketencıler S, Sungun M, Duran E. Our Experiences in the Heart and Great Vessel Injuries. 3rd Annual Congress on Update in Cardiology and Cardiovascular Surgery. Nov 28- Dec 02, 2007, Antalya, Turkey,
  - Gurkan S, Ege T, Ketencıler S, Unal S, Canbaz S, Duran E. Peripheric Vascular Injuries. 3rd Annual Congress on Update in Cardiology and Cardiovascular Surgery. Nov 28- Dec 02, 2007, Antalya, Turkey
  - Ege T, Gurkan S, Canbaz S, Huseyın S, Ketencıler S, Duran E. Our Clinical Experiences in Aneurysm Cases. 3rd Annual Congress on Update in Cardiology and Cardiovascular Surgery. Nov 28- Dec 02, 2007, Antalya, Turkey
- Papers published in international journals (selection 6 / 46).
  - Ege T, Eskiocak S, Edis M, Duran E. "The Role of N-Acetylcysteine in Lower Extremity Ischemia/Reperfusion." J Cardiovasc Surg 2006;47:563-8
  - Arar C, Colak A, Alagöl A, Uzer SS, Ege T, Turan N, Duran E, Pamukcu Z. "The Use of Esmolol and Magnesium to prevent Haemodynamic Responses to Extubation After Coronary Artery Grafting." Eur J Anaesthesiol 2007;24:826-83
  - Gurkan S, Sunar H, Canbaz S, Duran E. "Late manifestation of a pseudoaneurysm in the descending thoracic aorta." Vasa 2006;35:112-4.
  - Gur O, Canbaz S, Halıcı U, Duran E. "A splenic injury due to ruptured abdominal aortic aneurysm." J Cardiovasc Surg (Torino) 2007;48:528
  - Gur O, Canbaz S, Karaca OG, Duran E. "Iatrogenic femoral arterio-venous fistula and pseudoaneurysm following catheter insertion for hemodialysis." J Cardiovasc Surg (Torino) 2007;48:257-8.
- Papers published in international symposium and conference proceedings (selection 8 / 32).
  - Kayapınar R, Sunar H, Yalçın Ö, Kunduracılar H, Çıkırıkçıoğlu M, Halıcı Ü, Duran E. The role of activated monocytes in the healing of ischemic myocardium. The European Society for Cardiovascular Surgery 52nd International Congress; November 7–10, 2003, Istanbul, Turkey.
  - Sunar H, Ege T, Canbaz S, Çıkırıkçıoğlu M, Halıcı Ü, Edis M, Duran E. Insitu saphenous bypass in the treatment of infrainguinal prosthetic graft infection. The European Society for Cardiovascular Surgery 52nd International Congress; November 7–10, 2003, Istanbul, Turkey.
  - Ege T, Us MH, Sungun M, Yuksel V, Duran E. Cytokine Response in Lower Extremity Ischemia/Reperfusion. The 12th Annual Meeting of the Asian Society for Cardiovascular Surgery, April 2004, İstanbul, Turkey
  - Ege T, Duran E, Yuksel V, Cakır H. An Important Factor in Etiology of Deep Venous Thrombosis: Malignancy. The 12th Annual Meeting of the Asian Society for Cardiovascular Surgery, April 2004, İstanbul, Turkey
  - Ege T, Arar C, Canbaz S, Cıkırıkcıoglu M, Sunar H, Yuksel V, Duran E. The Importance of Aprotinin and Pentoxifylline in Preventing the Leucocyte Sequestration and Lung İnjury Caused By Protamine at the End of Cardiopulmonary Bypass Surgery. The 12th Annual Meeting of the Asian Society for Cardiovascular Surgery, April 2004, İstanbul, Turkey
  - Ege T, Canbaz S, Cıkırıkcıoglu M, Arar C, Edis M, Duran E. Importance of Preoperative Pulmonary Function Test in Cardiac Surgery. The 12th Annual Meeting of the Asian Society for Cardiovascular Surgery, April 2004, İstanbul, Turkey
  - Sunar H, Ege T, Canbaz S, Okten O, Halıcı U, Acıpayam M, Karaca OG, Gur O, Duran E. Radial Artery Transposition for Difficult arteriovenous Access. The European Society for Cardiovascular Surgery 54th International Congress, May 2005, Athens, Greece
  - Ege T, Halıcı U, Canbaz S, Yuksel V, Edis M, Cıkırıkcıoglu M, Duran E. Analysis of Etiologic Factors in Deep Venous Thrombosis. The European Society for Cardiovascular Surgery 54th International Congress, May 2005, Athens, Greece

== Awards ==
Duran has received a number of certificates, plates and plaques from national and international organizations, including:

- ALBANIA:
  - Certification of Participation in First International Conference on Balkan Studies for presenting his study and contributing the studies forming a Balkan Association in the future.
- BULGARIA:
  - An original brick from “Sv. Konstantin and Elena” Church built in Edirne in 1869. The brick from the wall of the church given by the Government of Bulgaria as symbol of his contributions in protecting historical works and cultural relations between Turkey and Bulgaria.
  - Honorary Degree Doctor Honoris Causa of University of Food Technologies, Plovdiv/Bulgaria (28 September 2009).
  - Dr. Honoris Causa of the Sofia University (2012)
- GREECE
  - Parnassos Award (Golden Plate, Golden Badge, and the Certificate) of Parnassos Philological Society given by Karolos Papoulias - the former President of Greece, Athens, Greece (17 April 2008)
  - The title of Peace Ambassador; the awards of Diploma and Diplomatic Passport by Balkan Political Form, Athens, Greece (23 November 2010)
- KOSOVO:
  - Certification of Appreciation for his contributions as medicine specialist of thoracic-cardiovascular surgery by Prof. Dr. Davut Mustafa the director of the Hospital in Prizren, Kosovo.
- MACEDONIA:
  - Professor Honoris Causa of Bitola St. Kliment Ohridski University, Bitola, Macedonia (6 December 2010)
- TURKEY:
  - Duran was awarded by director of Turkish Organization Dilek Sabanci to thank him for his contributions. He was given a plaque for his contributions in 14.Spring Festivals of University of Mugla by the rector Prof. Dr. Sener Oktık.
  - Duran awarded by rector Prof. Dr. Mustafa Aykaç for his great efforts in establishing of University of Kırklareli in September 2008. He was given a plaque for his success and contributions during the presidency of inter-university Council of Turkey in 2006–2007 Academic Year by Prof. Dr. Mustafa Akaydin, the next president.
  - The president of “GERCEK” Culture, Art and Sports Association Dr. Zeynel Abidin Ustaıbo awarded Duran for his contributions in May 2007.
  - Awarded ”2007 Man of the Year” by Southeastern Europe Journalists Society in 2007.
  - He was given a Gratitude Plaque for his contributions to Rotary Club and society by Edirne Rotary Club in 2007–2008 Term. He was awarded for showing sensitivity to the works done by Prime Ministry Social Services Society for the protection of children.
  - Awarded for contributions and giving great efforts to the international project called “Brothers Meeting at the Border” that is about peace, friendship and understanding in 2008. The award is given by Rotary Club Rtc. Ceren Ayözger.
  - Plate for his contributions to International Meeting “Legal Education in International Arena and Introduction to Profession of Law” by the president of Turkish Bar Association, Lawyer Ozdemir Ozok and the president of Edirne Bar Association in May 2008.

== Literature ==
- Enver Duran: Challenges of Higher Education Institutions in the Balkans, III Balkan Universities Network Meeting, Trakya Universität Edirne Mai 2010, ISBN 978-975-374-134-7
- Manfred G. Raupp: Lörrach Symposium - Lörrach Sempozyumu, Trakya Universität Edirne Mai 2011, ISBN 978-3-942298-02-5
