= Erhan Tabakoglu =

Turkish professor of medicine

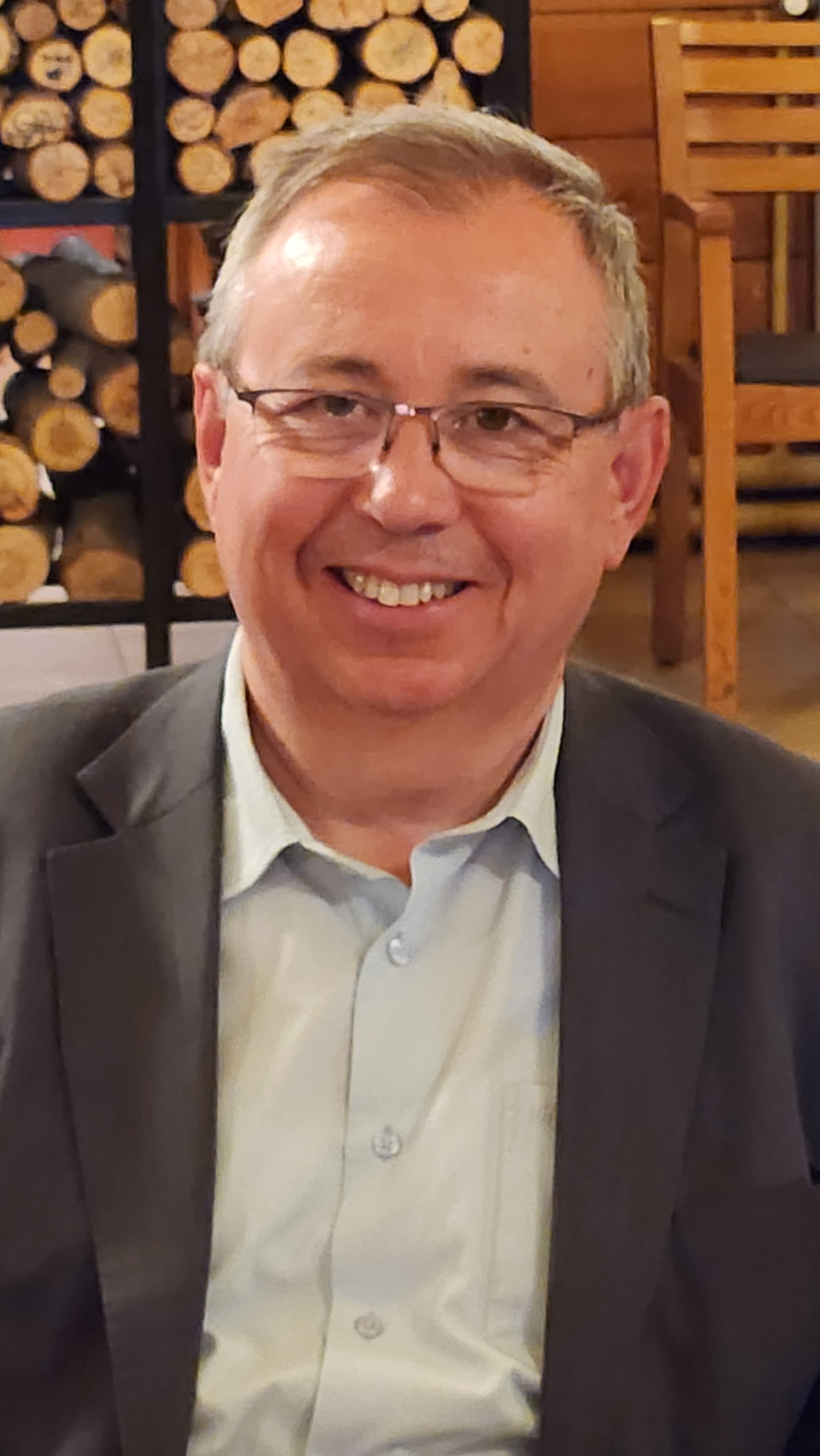
Erhan Tabakoglu (2024)

Erhan Tabakoğlu (born 1967 in Kırklareli in the Province of Kırklareli) is a Turkish professor of medicine at Trakya University. He was elected as the new rector of the university on 12 July 2016 by a majority vote, and at the end of July the election was confirmed. He defeated the incumbent rector Yener Yörük, who was also a candidate. In 2016 he was elected as General Secretary of Balkan Universities Association and in 2020 Tabakoglu was confirmed as rector for a second term until 2024.

== Life and work ==
Tabakoglu was born in 1967 and attended primary and secondary school in Alpulla and took school leaving examinations in Edirne. He then studied medicine at Istanbul University and performed his two-year military service in Adana.

Tabakoglu began his career at the Trakya University Clinic for Lung Disease in 1992, and in 2005 he became an associate professor. He has been professor of intensive care at the clinic since 2012.

Many scientific articles of him have been published in national and international channels about his specialization as Chest Diseases and Intensive Care, he also had active part in related unions. During his career he undertook many different administrative and academic duties like Medical Education Master Science Branch Faculty Membership, Medical Faculty Administrative Board Selected Associate Professor Delegation, Medical Faculty Hospital ISO Quality Certificate Internal Audit Responsibility, Medical Faculty Farabi Coordinating, Foreign Students Academic Consultancy, Sleeping Clinic Chest Diseases Responsibility, Trakya University Education Commission Medical Faculty Academic Membership.

As Trakya University Rector, he carries on tasks like Permanent Management Board Membership and Consistent General Secretary of Balkan Universities Union that has nearly 90 members from Balkan universities.

Erhan Tabakoglu is also performing Management board membership task of Trakya Universities Union which is the most active University Union of Turkey and consists of members Trakya University, Canakkale Onsekiz Mart University, Tekirdag Namık Kemal University, Kırklareli University and Bandırma Onyedi Eylul University.He was head of the board between 2018 and 2020.

Leading to determined important projects for Trakya University in many fields like Academic and Scientific Publishing, Museum Studies, Social Responsibility Projects, Public, University, Industry Cooperations, Integration with City and Region, Teknopark, Tabakoglu increased number of museums to 5 together with“ Sultan 2nd Bayezid Complex Trakya University Kitchen Museum”. One of them “Nature History Museum” is the first one in the region. Sultan 2nd Bayezid Complex and Health Museum has been rewarded as “museum of the year” by International University Museums Union Platform in 2021.

The revitalisation of international relations by Trakya University after the COVID pandemy is most important to rector Erhan Tabakoglu.

Erhan Tabakoglu is married and has two sons, he is interested in professional photography, plus diving, trekking and aikido sports.
