= Trakya University =

Public university located in Edirne, Turkey

Coordinates: 41.6517°N 26.5219°E

- Trakya Üniversitesi
- Emblem of Trakya University
- Motto: Bridge to the Future
- Type: Public
- Established: 20 July 1982; 43 years ago
- Rector: Prof. Dr. Mustafa Hatipler
- Students: 47.000 (2017)
- Location: Edirne, Turkey
- Website: www.trakya.edu.tr

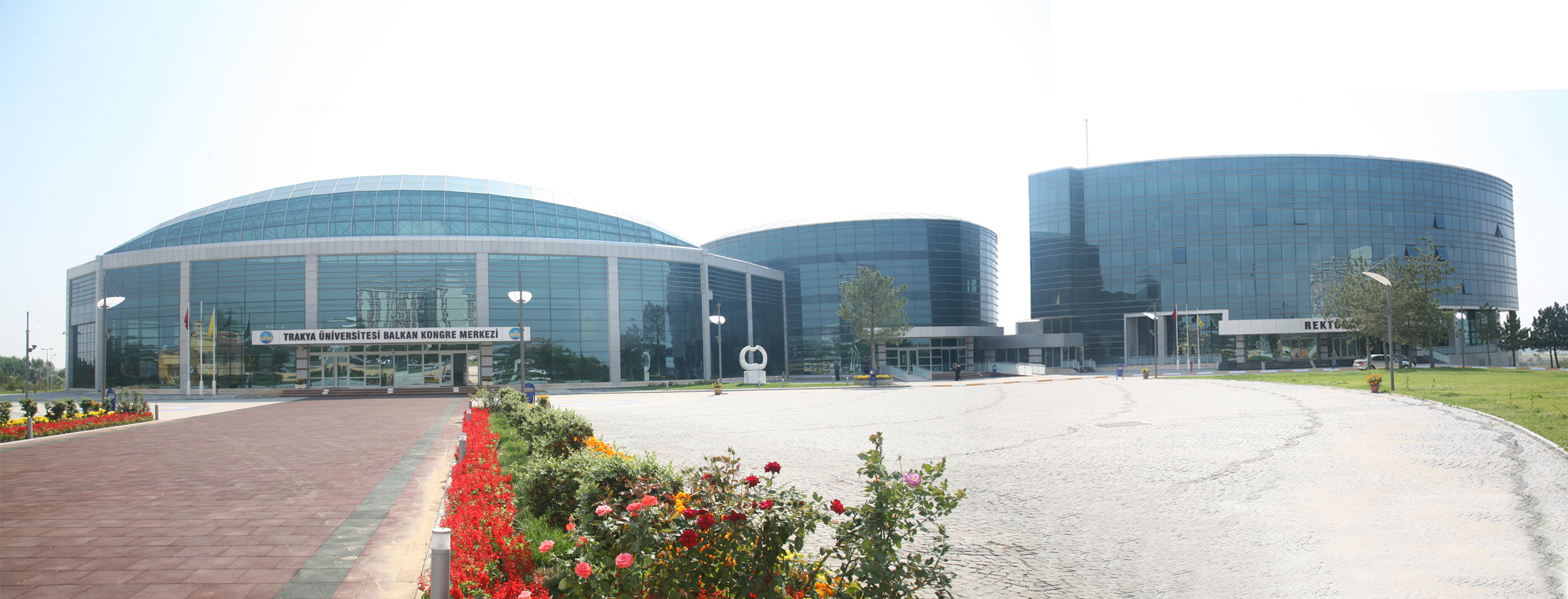
Main building of the Trakya University Edirne

Trakya University (Turkish: Trakya Üniversitesi) is a public university in Edirne, Turkey. It was established on July 20, 1982. The university is located in Edirne, in Eastern Thrace. Trakya University is a regional university with branches and campuses spread over the Thrace region. Trakya University runs scientific activities related to regional development and has international relationships especially within the Balkan Universities Network including more than 40 Universities from Balkan countries and the University Loerrach in Germany. Erhan Tabakoglu was elected and confirmed as new Rector of the university in July 2016.

== History ==
The roots of Higher Education in Thrace date back to the foundation day (1488) of the Medical School in the complex of Sultan Bayezid II. Basic medical sciences of the period were taught in this school where 18 students received theoretical and practical education of medicine each year. Its hospital was the practice place of the educational institution. The foundations of function of the educational and application hospitals of nowadays were laid in these institutions.

In the Republic Period, Trakya University was established on July 20, 1982. There were originally three institutes (Social Sciences, Natural Sciences, Health Sciences), four faculties (Faculty of Medicine, Engineering-Architecture, Science and Letters, Tekirdağ Agriculture), two colleges (Edirne Education, Çanakkale Education), four vocational high schools (Edirne, Çanakkale, Kırklareli, Tekirdağ).

Later, four faculties (Faculties of Engineering, Çorlu; Economics and Administrative Sciences; Education, Edirne; Technical Education, Kırklareli;); two colleges (State Conservatory, Kırkpınar Physical Education and Sports College); sixteen vocational colleges (Edirne, Kırklareli ve Tekirdağ Vocational Colleges of Health Services; Vocational Colleges of Hayrabolu, Keşan, İpsala, Malkara, Lüleburgaz, Şarköy, Uzunköprü, Babaeski, Çerkezköy, Marmara Ereğlisi, Havsa, Muratlı, Saray) were established.

Afterwards, one institute (Balkan Research), six faculties (Faculties of Fine Arts, Health Sciences, Science, Letters, Pharmacy and Dentistry), three colleges (Foreign Languages, Edirne and Keşan Applied Sciences Colleges), six vocational schools (Edirne Social Sciences, Edirne, Technical Sciences, Kırklareli Social Sciences, Kırklareli Technical Sciences, Arda, Tunca), Research and Application Centers were added to Trakya University.

Among the academic units of Trakya University, during the rectorate of Enver Duran, those in Çanakkale transferred to Çanakkale Onsekiz Mart University in 1992, those in Tekirdağ transferred to Namık Kemal University in 2006, and those in Kırklareli transferred to Kırklareli University in 2007.

Now that, there exists ten faculties (Medicine, Engineering and Architecture, Economics and Administrative Sciences, Education, Fine Arts, Health Sciences, Science, Letters, Pharmacy, Dentistry), four institutes (Social Sciences, Natural Sciences, Health Sciences, Balkan Research), five colleges (State Conservatory, Kırkpınar Physical Education and Sports, Foreign Languages, Edirne Applied Sciences and Keşan Yusuf Çapraz Applied Sciences), nine vocational colleges (Edirne Social Sciences, Edirne, Technical Sciences, Edirne Health Services, Keşan, Uzunköprü, Havsa, İpsala, Arda, Tunca), Twenty Research and Application centers (Atatürk's Principles and Revolution History, Balkan, Computer, Plant Breeding, Environmental Issues, Language Education, Cancer Registry, Health, Water Products, Continuing Education, Trakya, Kırkpınar, Women's Issues, Organ Transplantation, International Physics and Applied Mathematics, Education for Mentally and Physically Handicapped Children, Edirne, technology researches, entrepreneurship, distance education) and one kindergarten.

Number of Staff at Trakya University (2011)
Title	Women	Men	Total
Professor	32	101	133
Assoc. Prof.	37	61	98
Assist Prof.	141	167	308
Lecturer	110	101	211
Specialist	15	22	37
Instructor	52	47	99
Research Ass.	229	300	529
Academic Staff	616	799	1415
Administration	700	816	1516
Total	1316	1615	2931

== Campuses ==
- Karaağaç Campus: Previously used as Rectorate building and related administrative units, now Faculty of Fine arts, Lozan Museum and Monument, Garden of Lozan, İlhan Koman Painting and Sculpture museum are in this campus. The total closed area of the units is 11.700 square meter.
- Balkan Campus: This campus is rapidly improving for being an ideal living space that provides the local community, personnel, and students with education, administrative, social, and cultural opportunities. Rectorate building and related administrative units, the biggest congress center of the Balkans; Balkan Congress Center, State Conservatory Arts and Education Center; Türkan Sabancı Culture Center and 75th year Indoor Sports Hall are found in this campus. Besides these, as well as Institutes of Health Sciences, Natural Sciences, Social Sciences, Balkan; State Conservatory; Faculties of Medicine, Science, Letters, Economics and Administrative Sciences, Kırkpınar Physical Education and Sports College; Vocational College Health Services and Tunca Vocational College. Trakya University Hospital is the fifth biggest reference hospital in Turkey.
- Prof. Dr. Ahmet Tarık Karadeniz Campus: Called by the name of our founder Rector. The departments of mechanical engineering, computer engineering, food engineering and electrical and electronic engineering of Engineering and Architecture faculty are in this campus.
- Ayşekadın Campus: In this campus, the Faculties of Health Sciences, College of Foreign Languages, College of Applied Sciences; Arda Vocational College, Edirne Vocational College of Social Sciences, and Trakya University Kindergarten provide service.
- Kosovo Campus: Education has started in the 2011–2012 academic year in this new building of Education Faculty.
- İsmail Hakkı Tonguç Campus: There are Fine Arts Department of Education Faculty, Dean's Office and Administrative Departments in this campus.
- Sarayiçi Campus: Edirne Vocational College of Technical Sciences provides educational services in this campus.
- Saraçhane Campus: Edirne College of Health continued educational activities for a period (2005–2008) in this campus.
- Macedonia Campus: Architecture department of Faculty of Engineering and Architecture serves in this campus.
- Uzunköprü Vocational College Campus: Situated in Uzunköprü district of Edirne. Vocational College of Uzunköprü is included in this campus.
- Keşan Vocational College Campus: This campus is in the district of Keşan and provides education with Keşan Vocational College in this campus.
- Havsa Vocational College Campus: Situated in the district of Havsa, this campus continues education with Havsa Vocational College.
- İpsala Vocational College Campus: Found in the district of İpsala; İpsala Vocational College provides education in this campus.

== Expansion to the Balkans ==
Projects about expansion to the Balkans are the leading studies of Trakya University in the recent years. Trakya University has developed very important projects and these studies have been promoted by the upper stages of the state. Scientific and cultural agreement protocols have been signed with the universities of the Balkan countries and much of these projects have been put into practice. In this respect, the biggest of the Balkan Conferences has been organized in Edirne with the participation of 61 universities. With the help of these activities all over the Balkans, the students tend to have education in foreign countries and they attribute a lot to the scientific and cultural dialogue between the countries.

Number of Students at Trakya University
Academic Year	Number of International Students	Number of Total Students
2002–2003	294	24.910
2003–2004	306	26.538
2004–2005	307	28.821
2005–2006	308	31.073
2006–2007	281	21.124
2007–2008	263	16.561
2008–2009	271	19.188
2009–2010	320	22.268
2010–2011	630	30.979
2011–2012	892	30.317
2012–2013	920	32.000
2016–2017	2.300	47.000

Remark: Spin off = Namık Kemal University 2006; Kırklareli University 2007

== Research ==
The number of publications of Trakya University in the scope of Web of Science (SCI-Expanded+SSCI+AHCI) is gradually increasing. The undergraduate, graduate, and postgraduate programs are in accord with the 1999 Bologna declaration.

According to data gathered by Thomson Reuters Web of Science (WOS) (SCI-Expanded+SSCI+AHCI), while the number of publication addressed by Trakya University, in the scope of these indexes between 1982 and 2009 was 13 (full article); this number reached 843 (692 full article) between 2001 and 2005; and 1206 (973 full article) between 2005 and 2009. According to Thomson Reuters WOS data, the numbers of citations of the publications addressed by Trakya University in the scope of these indexes between 2005 and 2009 are as follows: In 2005: 716 citations, in 2009: 1750 citations (the number of citation referred for each publication is 5.29) When the data on the internet site (www.yok.gov.tr) of Council of Higher Education is analyzed, the place of Trakya University among other universities in Turkey in terms of the publications published in the journals in the scope of WOS is as follows: in 2005, 27th among 77 universities, in 2008, 30th among 114 universities (in terms of WOS full article), in 2009, 37th among 125 universities and in 2010, 45th among 131 universities.

- Research Centers at Trakya University
  - Health Research and application center
  - Atatürk's principles and history of Turkish revolution research and application center
  - Research and application center for mentally and movement handicapped children
  - Environmental Problems application and research
  - Computer research and application center
  - Balkan research and application center
  - International physics and applied mathematics research
  - Cancer record application and research
  - Language teaching and learning research and application center
  - Edirne research and application center
  - Plant breeding application and research
  - Water Products research and application center
  - Trakya research and application center
  - Continuing education research and application center
  - Distance Education research and application center
  - Kırkpınar and Its Values research and application center
  - Women's Issues research and application center
  - Organ Transplantation research and application center
  - Technology researches and development applications and research center
  - Entrepreneurship applications and research center

== Library ==
Central Library: University's Directorate of Library and Documentation Central Library was established in 1989 by the moving of the library in the scope of the Faculty of Science and Letters to Türkan Sabancı Culture Center. It moved to its new building in which modern library services are provided on 19 May 2004.

Trakya University, Directorate of Library and Documentation, the founder of Europe Libraries Association became a member of Balkan Libraries Association in 2009 fulfills the information needs of the lecturers and the students uninterruptedly through developing information technologies for 24 hours a day, on the interactive medium and it conducts these services via a website created.

Special Service for sight-disabled people:

- Access to a “talking library,” a selection of vocalized books in the national library
- The chance of accessing voiced course books of Anadolu University, Open education faculty from the talking library
- Jaws for Windows screen reading program helps users research on the internet in the library

Ayşekadın Campus library: The university started to work on establishing branch office libraries, and as a result of this Ayşekadın Campus Library was established affiliated to Central Library and Documentation Centre in 2008. In this context, Ayşekadın Campus Library refers to the materials that the departments would need in Ayşekadın Campus.

Resources (2011): Number of Books 84.472; Thesis 4.486; Visual Materials 4.62; Electronic Journals 18.068; E-Books 71.257; printed periodical publications (Title) 127; Subscribed Databasis 23.

== Balkan Symphony Orchestra ==
Trakya University Balkan Symphony Orchestra was founded in March, 2006. The Balkan Symphony Orchestra is founded with the participation of students of Trakya University State Conservatory high school, undergraduate, graduate and proficiency in art and also the faculty members. Since its foundation, Trakya University Balkan Symphony Orchestra has given more than 40 concerts especially in Thrace region, Edirne, Kırklareli, Tekirdağ and also in Istanbul. The Orchestra has received invitations from Balkan Countries and performed concerts in Greece and Bulgaria. Trakya University Balkan Symphony Orchestra, being in the process of institutional structuring, has the feature of being the first and only symphonic orchestra in Thrace Region. Continually renewing its repertoire, the orchestra gives place to Baroque, Classical, Romantic and Contemporary works as well as the works of Turkish composers in their concert programs.

== Balkan Youth Fire ==
Set up in the scope of our university in 2007, the folk dance group Balkan Gençlik Ateşi has had an important role in the presentation of our traditional culture especially making presentations in many Balkan countries. Many activities have been carried out between Trakya University and other universities in the Balkans through close relationships that display the region's cultural wealth. Balkan Gençlik Ateşi is one of the most important projects devoted to Balkans that is established for this purpose in parallel with the Mission and the Vision of Trakya University. Balkan Gençlik Ateşi, which both gives a new image to Trakya University's cultural-artistic activities and sets the light to an age with its original shows that reflects the common history of Turkey and the countries in the Balkans, carries out burning with the fire caught from the power of modern youth and art.

== Student clubs ==
These include the Theatre Club (founded by the students of the faculty of medicine), Shadow Players Club, Glass-Made Players Club, Scientific Research Club, TurkMSIC Club, Kuvay-I Milliye Club, Social Research Club, Poetry and Visual Acts Club, Humour Club, Cinema Club, Chess Club and Music Club functions.

There is a Festival of Medicine and the Yearbook Committee's graduation ceremonies. There are two performance halls, and closed/open gymnasiums available for the students' use during all the above activities. In addition, smaller halls are assigned to clubs such as Chess Club, by the Deanery.

The presence of the Trakya University State Conservatory in the campus gives the students the opportunity to watch all the artistic performances organized by the Conservatory. Environment trips are organized under the guidance of the faculty members.

== History Edirne & Beyazid II Külliye Health Museum ==
The Beyazid II Külliye Health Museum in Edirne was founded by Dr Ratip Kazancigil as a part of Trakya University. A külliye is an Ottoman architectural term for a complex of buildings centered on a mosque. Bayezid II Külliye was built in 1488 by the Ottoman sultan Bayezid II. It provided medical education to students, and healthcare to patients using oriental medicine. The complex contains a darüşşifa (hospital, medical center) and it remained in operation for four hundred years as of 1488 until the Russo-Turkish War (1877–1878). The hospital was notable for its treatment methods for mental illnesses, which included the use of music, water sound, and scents.

The historic Darüşşifa was incorporated into the structure of Trakya University, also based in Edirne, in 1993 and converted into a "Health Museum", a museum dedicated to the history of medicine and health matters in general, in 1997. It is Turkey's only museum in its field and provides information to visitors on the development of medical sciences and of medical services throughout history, especially Ottoman history. The museum is the second most visited historical site in Edirne after Selimiye Mosque.

Trakya University Complex of Sultan Bayezid II Health Museum got its first international success by being awarded the Council of Europe Museum Prize for 2004. The museum participated in “the Best in Heritage” event in Dubrovnik, Croatia in 2005 and was chosen the second-best presentation, for which it was accepted to the Excellence Club. In 2006, it received the Award of Merit given by the Association of Southeast European Journalists. In 2007, it was promoted in the World Psychiatry Congress held in Osaka, Japan. The Health Museum was awarded the Best Presentation in the Best in Heritage - Excellence Club meeting held by European Heritage Association in Cologne, Germany in 2007. Health Museum was founded in 1997 and welcomed a new section, which is the “Medical School” in 2008. The health museum continues its success by being accepted to take part in European education projects.

== Previous Rectors ==
- Professor Ahmet Karadeniz (1982–1992)
- Professor Poyraz Ülger (1992–1996)
- Professor Osman İnci (1996–2004)
- Professor Enver Duran (2004–2012)
- Professor Yener Yörük (2012–2016)

== Gallery ==
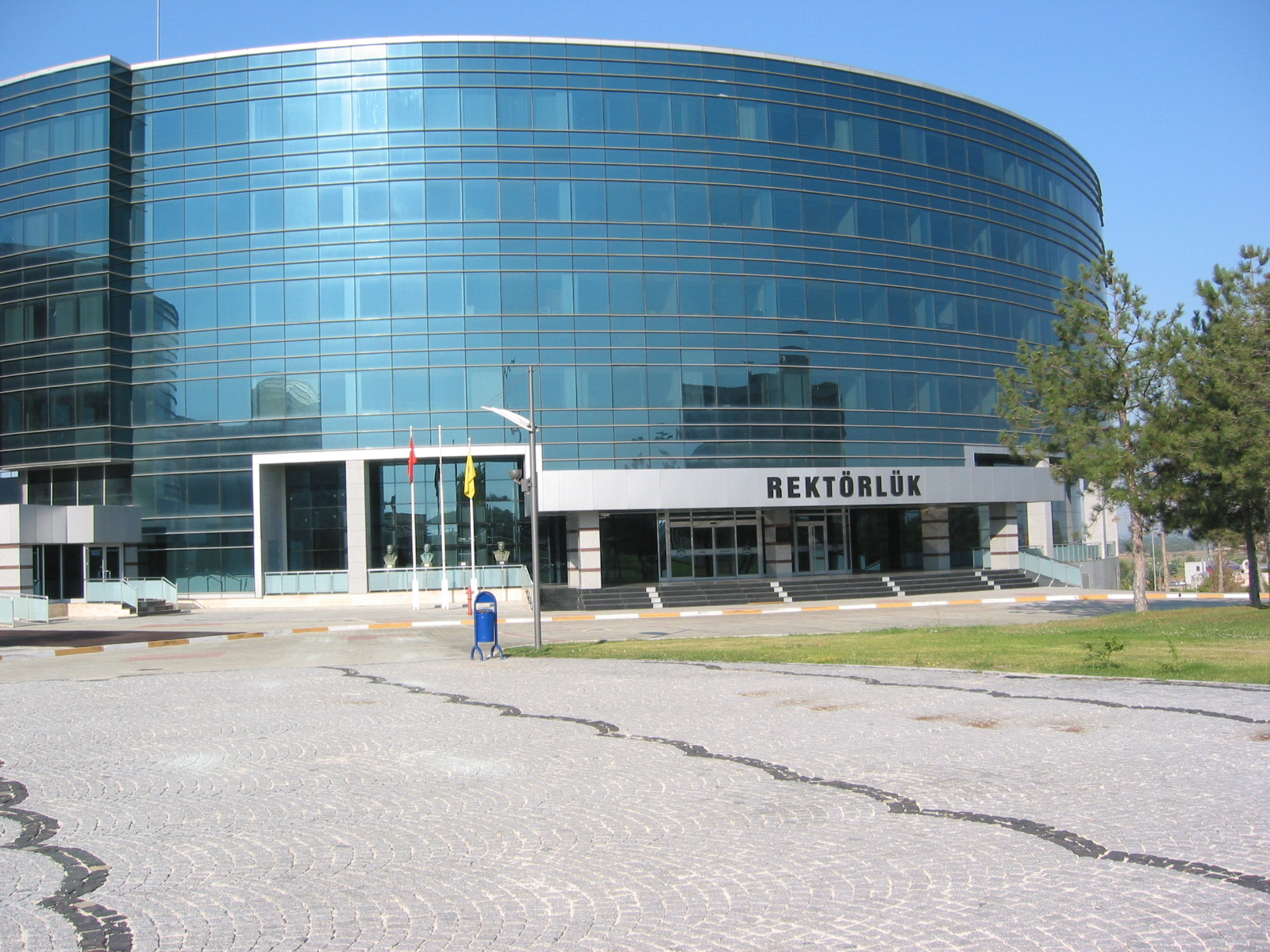
Rectorat of the Trakya University Edirne

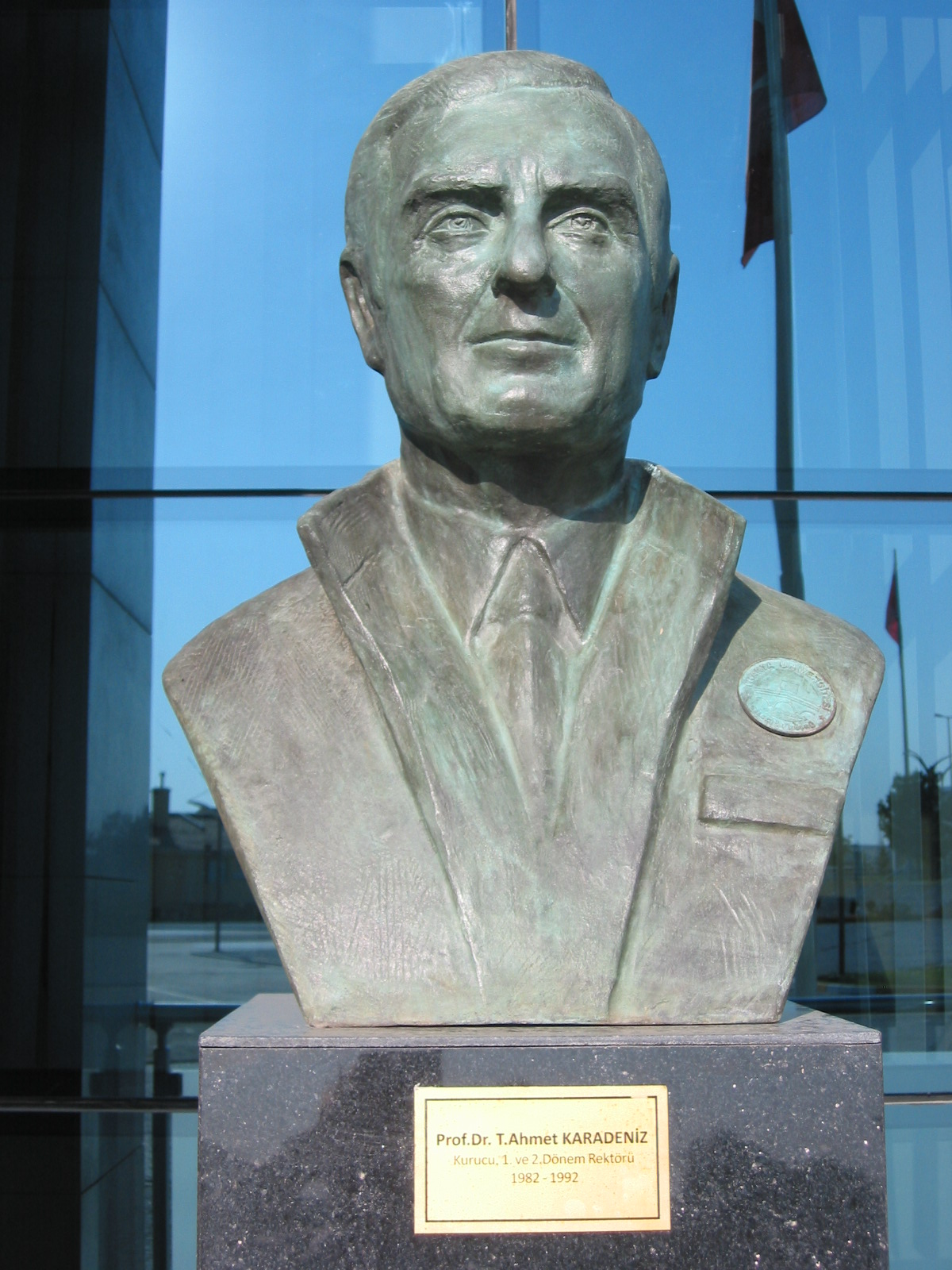
Memorial Bust Ahmet Kardeniz, Rector 1982–1992

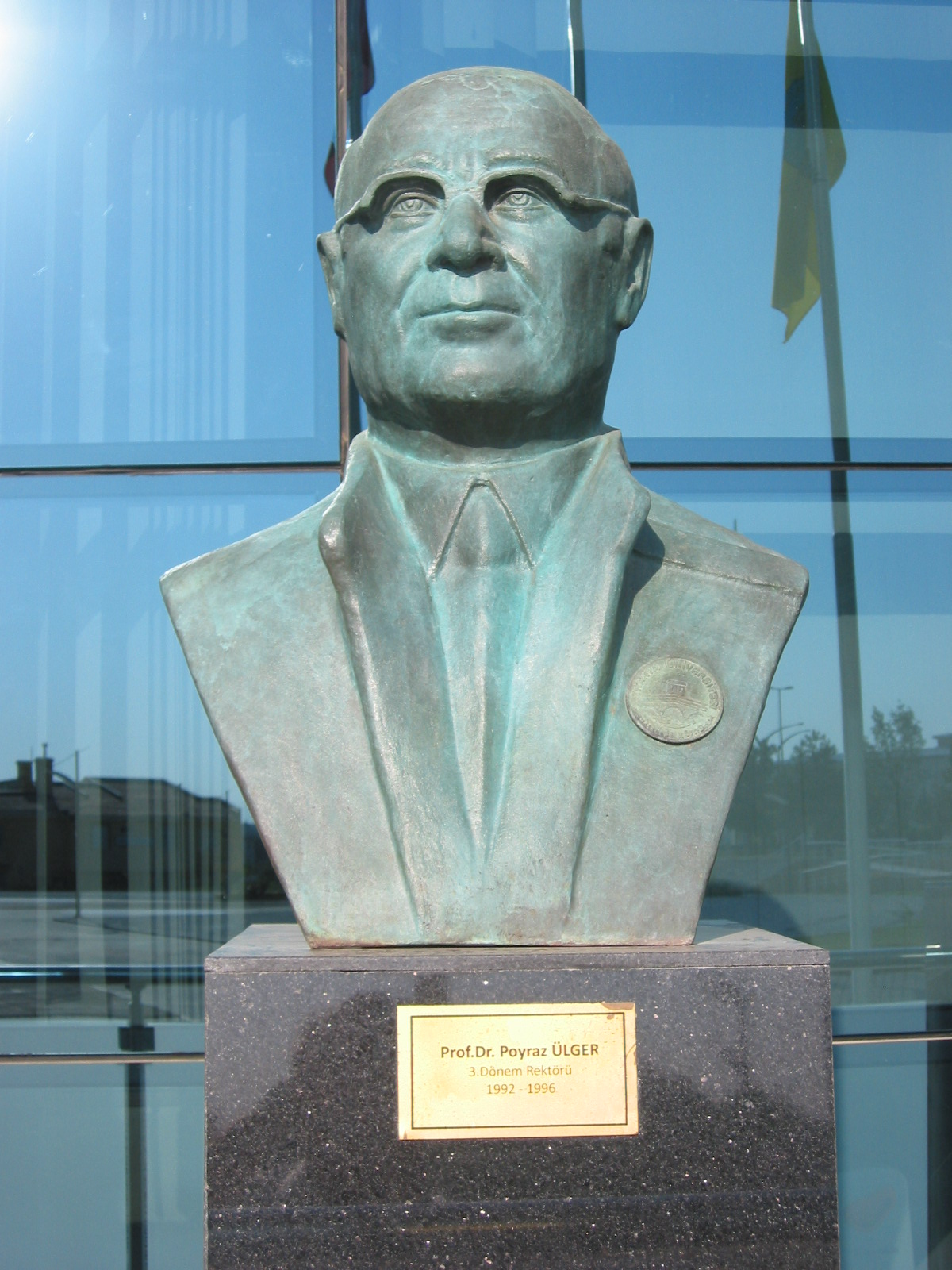
Memorial Bust Poyraz Ülger, Rector 1992–1996

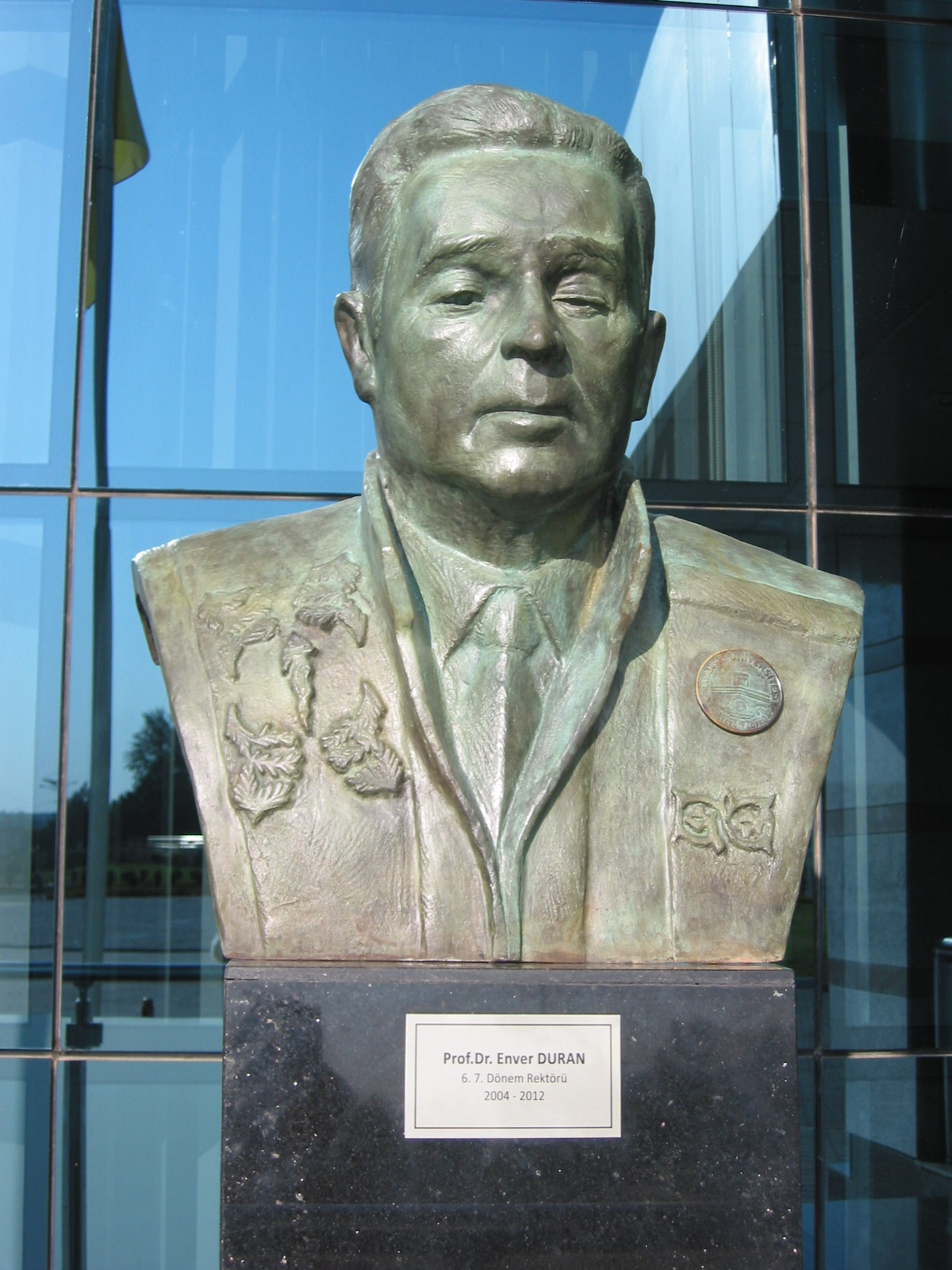
Memorial Bust Enver Duran, Rector 2004–2012

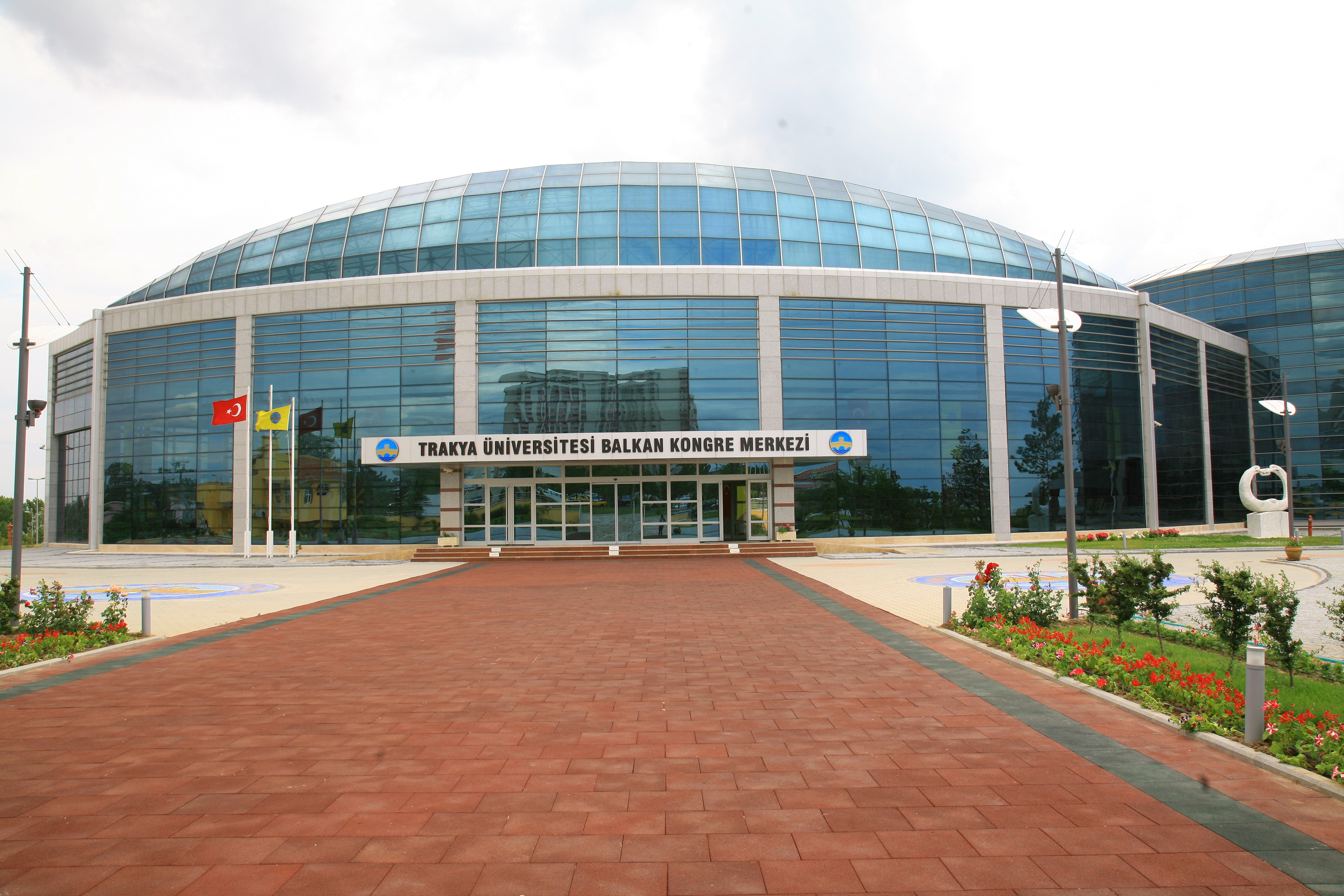
Congress building at Trakya University Edirne

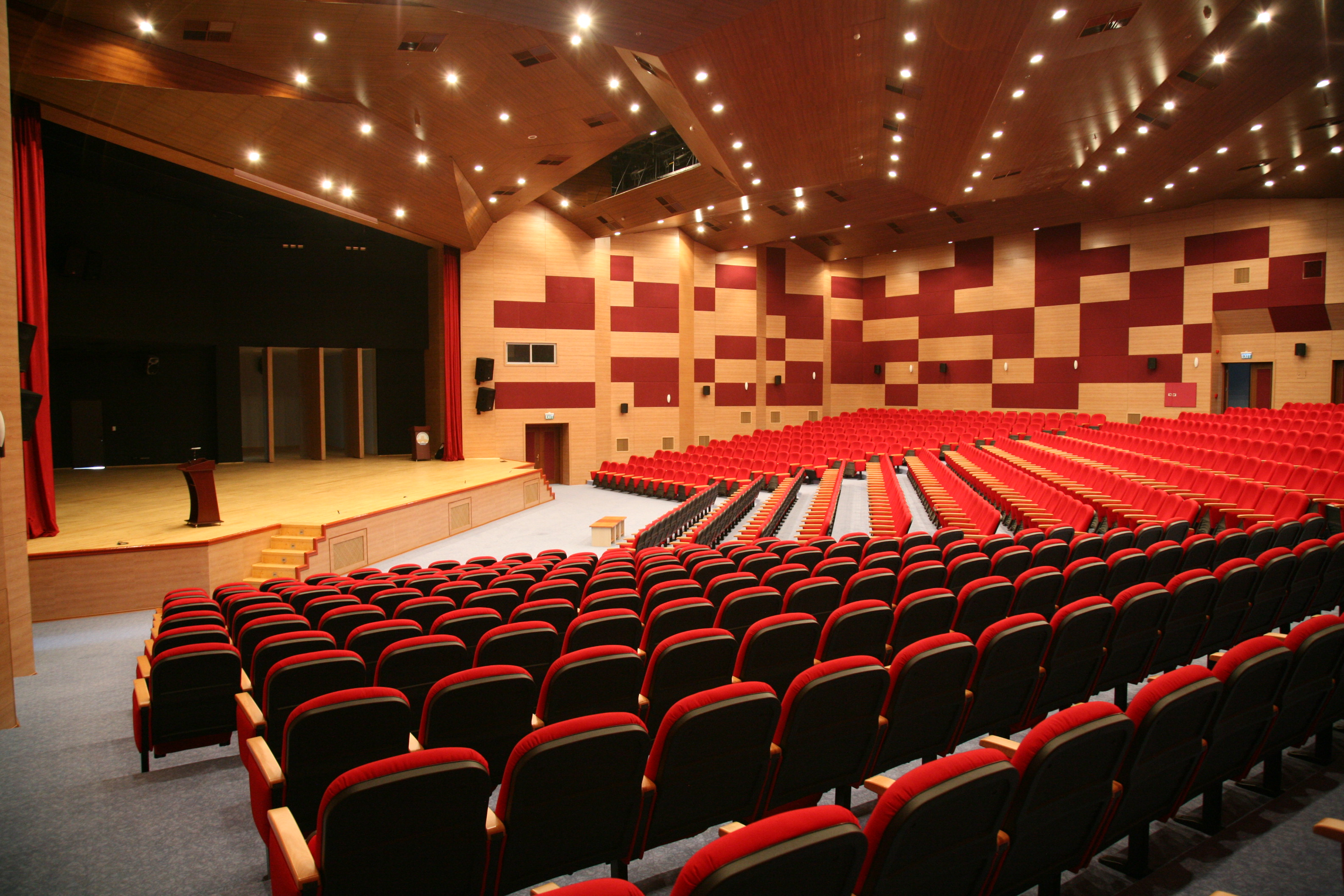
Auditorium of the Conventional Center at Trakya University

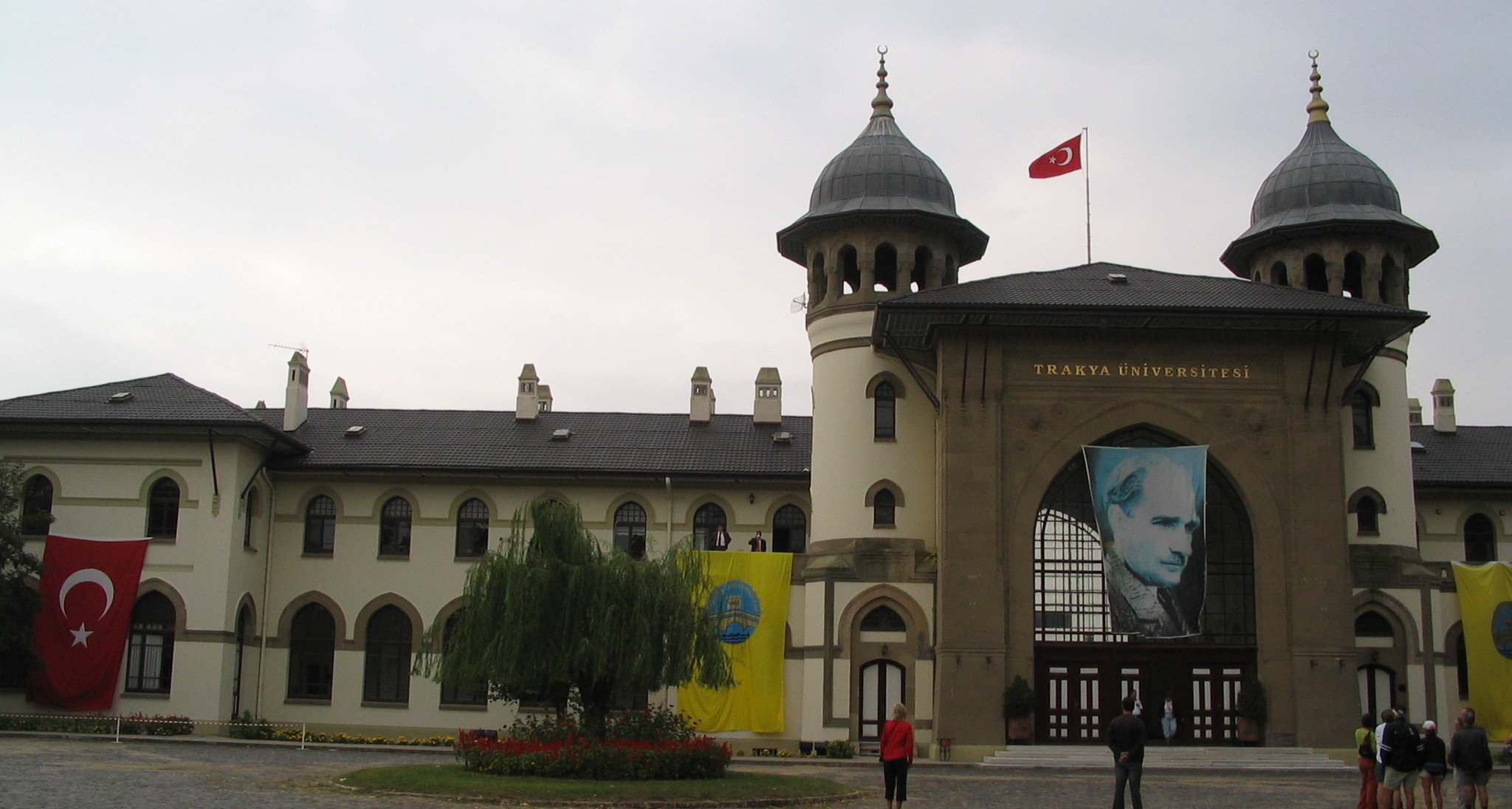
Railway station Edirne, Rector's office at Trakya University 1998–2011

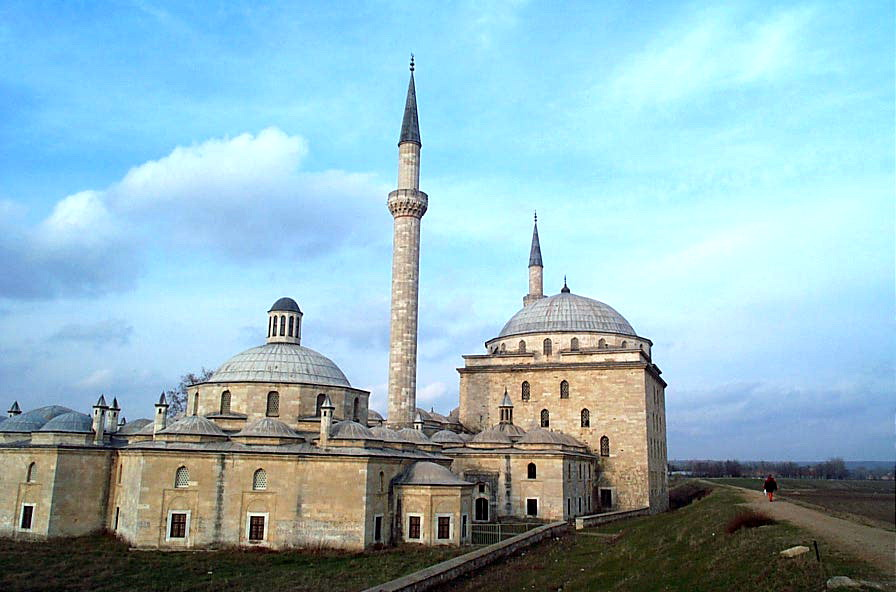
Healthmuseum Darüşşifa (erected 1488), part of the Medical-Faculty

== Notable alumni and professors ==
- Birgül Erken, Turkish champion free diver
- Recep Gürkan (born 1964), Mayor of Edirne
- Yavuz Karamollaoğlu, Turkish karateka
- Hilmi Ibar (born 1947), Professor of Chemistry
- Necmettin Hacıeminoğlu, founder of the Turkish Language and Literature Faculty
