= Lörrach (electoral district) =

State electoral district of Germany

58: Lörrach
- Electoral district for the Landtag of Baden-Württemberg
- Lörrach in 2026
- District: Lörrach
- Electorate: 124,212 (2026)
- Major settlements: Aitern, Bad Bellingen, Binzen, Böllen, Efringen-Kirchen, Eimeldingen, Fischingen, Fröhnd, Grenzach-Wyhlen, Häg-Ehrsberg, Hasel, Hausen im Wiesental, Inzlingen, Kleines Wiesental, Lörrach, Maulburg, Rümmingen, Schallbach, Schönau im Schwarzwald, Schönenberg, Schopfheim, Steinen, Todtnau, Tunau, Utzenfeld, Weil am Rhein, Wembach, Wieden, Wittlingen, and Zell im Wiesental

Current electoral district
- Party: Green
- Member: Sarah Hagmann

Lörrach is an electoral constituency (German: Wahlkreis) represented in the Landtag of Baden-Württemberg.

Since 2026, it has elected one member via first-past-the-post voting. Voters cast a second vote under which additional seats are allocated proportionally state-wide. Under the constituency numbering system, it is designated as constituency 58.

It is wholly within the district of Lörrach.

== Geography ==
The constituency includes the municipalities of Aitern, Bad Bellingen, Binzen, Böllen, Efringen-Kirchen, Eimeldingen, Fischingen, Fröhnd, Grenzach-Wyhlen, Häg-Ehrsberg, Hasel, Hausen im Wiesental, Inzlingen, Kleines Wiesental, Lörrach, Maulburg, Rümmingen, Schallbach, Schönau im Schwarzwald, Schönenberg, Schopfheim, Steinen, Todtnau, Tunau, Utzenfeld, Weil am Rhein, Wembach, Wieden, Wittlingen, and Zell im Wiesental within the district of Lörrach.

There were 124,212 eligible voters in 2026.

== Members ==
=== First mandate ===
Both prior to and since the electoral reforms for the 2026 election, the winner of the plurality of the vote (first-past-the-post) in every constituency won the first mandate.

Election	Member	Party	%
1976	Wilhelm Jung	CDU	
1980	Heinz Eyrich	CDU	
1984	Heinz Eyrich	CDU	
1988	Heinz Eyrich	CDU	
1992	Peter Reinelt	SPD	
1996	Martin Zeiher	CDU	
2001	Rainer Stickelberger	SPD	41.6
2006	Ulrich Lusche	CDU	38.2
2011	Ulrich Lusche	CDU	31.8
2016	Josha Frey	Grüne	31.7
2021	Josha Frey	Grüne	35.8
Jan 2024	Sarah Hagmann	Grüne	35.8
2026	Sarah Hagmann	Grüne	27.4

=== Second mandate ===
Prior to the electoral reforms for the 2026 election, the seats in the state parliament were allocated proportionately amongst parties which received more than 5% of valid votes across the state. The seats that were won proportionally for parties that did not win as many first mandates as seats they were entitled to, were allocated to their candidates which received the highest proportion of the vote in their respective constituencies. This meant that following some elections, a constituency would have one or more members elected under a second mandate.

Prior to 2011, these second mandates were allocated to the party candidates who got the greatest number of votes, whilst from 2011-2021, these were allocated according to percentage share of the vote.

Election	Member	Party	Member	Party
1976	Peter Reinelt	SPD		
1980	Peter Reinelt	SPD		
1984	Peter Reinelt	SPD		
1988	Peter Reinelt	SPD		
1992				
1996	Peter Reinelt	SPD		
2001				
2006	Rainer Stickelberger	SPD		
2011	Rainer Stickelberger	SPD	Josha Frey	Grüne
2016	Rainer Stickelberger	SPD		
2021	Jonas Hoffmann	SPD		

== Election results ==
=== 2026 election ===
State election (2026): Lörrach
Notes:	Blue background denotes the winner of the electorate vote. Pink background denotes a candidate elected from their party list. Yellow background denotes an electorate win by a list member, or other incumbent. A ✓ or ✗ denotes status of any incumbent, win or lose respectively.						
Party	Candidate	Votes	%	±%	Party votes	%	±%
Greens	✓ Sarah Hagmann	22,115	27.4	▼8.4	26,073	32.3	▼3.6
CDU	Peter Schelshorn	22,010	27.3	▲5.9	21,023	26.0	▲4.7
AfD	Wolfgang Koch	14,707	18.2	▲10.3	14,547	18.0	▲10.1
SPD	Jonas Hoffmann	9,934	12.3	▼0.3	5,638	7.0	▼5.6
FDP	Felix Düster	3,797	4.7	▼5.6	3,148	3.9	▼6.4
Left	Lars Biesenthal	3,617	4.5	▲1.4	3,614	4.5	▲1.4
FW	Ulrich Kissel	2,969	3.7	▲1.3	2,077	2.6	▲0.2
BSW					1,276	1.6	
Volt	Thomas Brenneisen	1,114	1.4		905	1.1	
APT					783	1.0	
Bündnis C					370	0.5	▼0.2
PARTEI					343	0.4	▼1.5
dieBasis					234	0.3	▼1.1
Team Todenhöfer	Ahsan Bashir	34	0.4		166	0.2	
Values					125	0.2	
Pensioners					123	0.2	
ÖDP					98	0.1	▼0.4
PdF					63	0.1	
Verjüngungsforschung					63	0.1	
Humanists					52	0.1	
KlimalisteBW					38	0.0	▼1.2
Informal votes		716			564		
Total valid votes		80,607			80,759		
Turnout		81,323	65.5	▲5.5			
Greens hold	Majority	105	0.1				

== See also ==
- Politics of Baden-Württemberg
- Landtag of Baden-Württemberg
