= Wiese (river) =

Tributary of the Rhine in the southern Black Forest

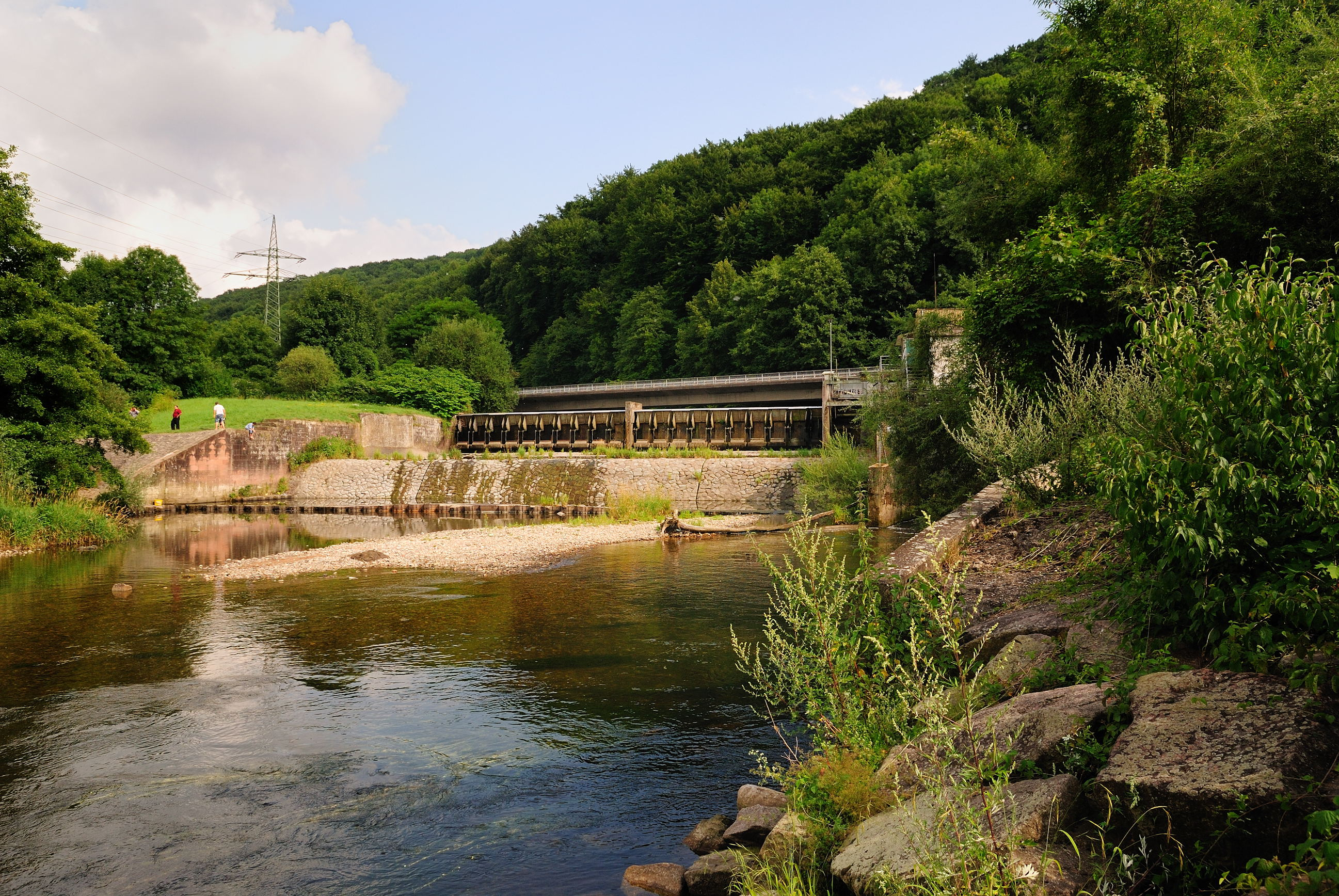
- The Wiese near Lörrach

Location
- Location: Counties of Breisgau-Hochschwarzwald and Lörrach; Baden-Württemberg (Germany); Basel-Stadt (Switzerland)
- Reference no.: DE: 232, CH: 541

Physical characteristics
- Source
  - location: in the Black Forest between the Feldberg and the Grafenmatt
  - coordinates: 47°51′24″N 8°01′31″E
  - elevation: ca. 1,218 m above sea level (NN)
- Mouth
  - location: between the Basel quarters of Klybeck and Kleinhüningen into the Upper Rhine
  - coordinates: 47°34′58″N 7°35′13″E
  - elevation: etwa 244 m above sea level (NN)
- Length: 57.82 km (35.93 mi)
- Basin size: 454.7 km^{2} (175.6 sq mi)

Basin features
- Progression: Rhine→ North Sea
- Tributaries
  - left: Prägbach, Angenbach, for others see Tributaries
  - right: Schönenbach, Wiedenbach, Kleine Wiese, Steinenbach, for others see Tributaries

The Wiese (German pronunciation: [ˈviːzə]) is a river, 57.8 kilometres long, and a right-hand tributary of the Rhine in southwest Germany and northwest Switzerland.

From its source in Baden-Württemberg in the Southern Black Forest on the mountain of the Feldberg, it flows for a short distance though the county of Breisgau-Hochschwarzwald and then mainly across Lörrach and through numerous settlements including the county town of Lörrach. After crossing the international border, the lower reaches of the river pass through the canton of Basel-Stadt, mainly through the city of Basel and through its district of Kleinbasel before emptying into the Upper Rhine.

The valley of the Wiese, which drains a catchment of 455 square kilometres, is called the Wiesental or Wiese Valley; it is oriented roughly towards the south-west. Its largest tributary is the Little Wiese (Kleine Wiese) which approaches from the north. The right-hand Rhine tributary of the Wiese and the left-hand Rhine tributaries of the Birsig, which discharges into the Rhine at the Basel port of Schifflände, and the Mühlebach, which flows under the Dreirosen Bridge, are the three biggest Upper Rhine tributaries on Swiss soil.

== Name ==
Etymologically, the name Wiese is probably derived from the Old European root word virs or is- for water, or water, and has nothing to do with the German word Wiese, which means "meadow".

== Geography ==
=== Course of the river ===
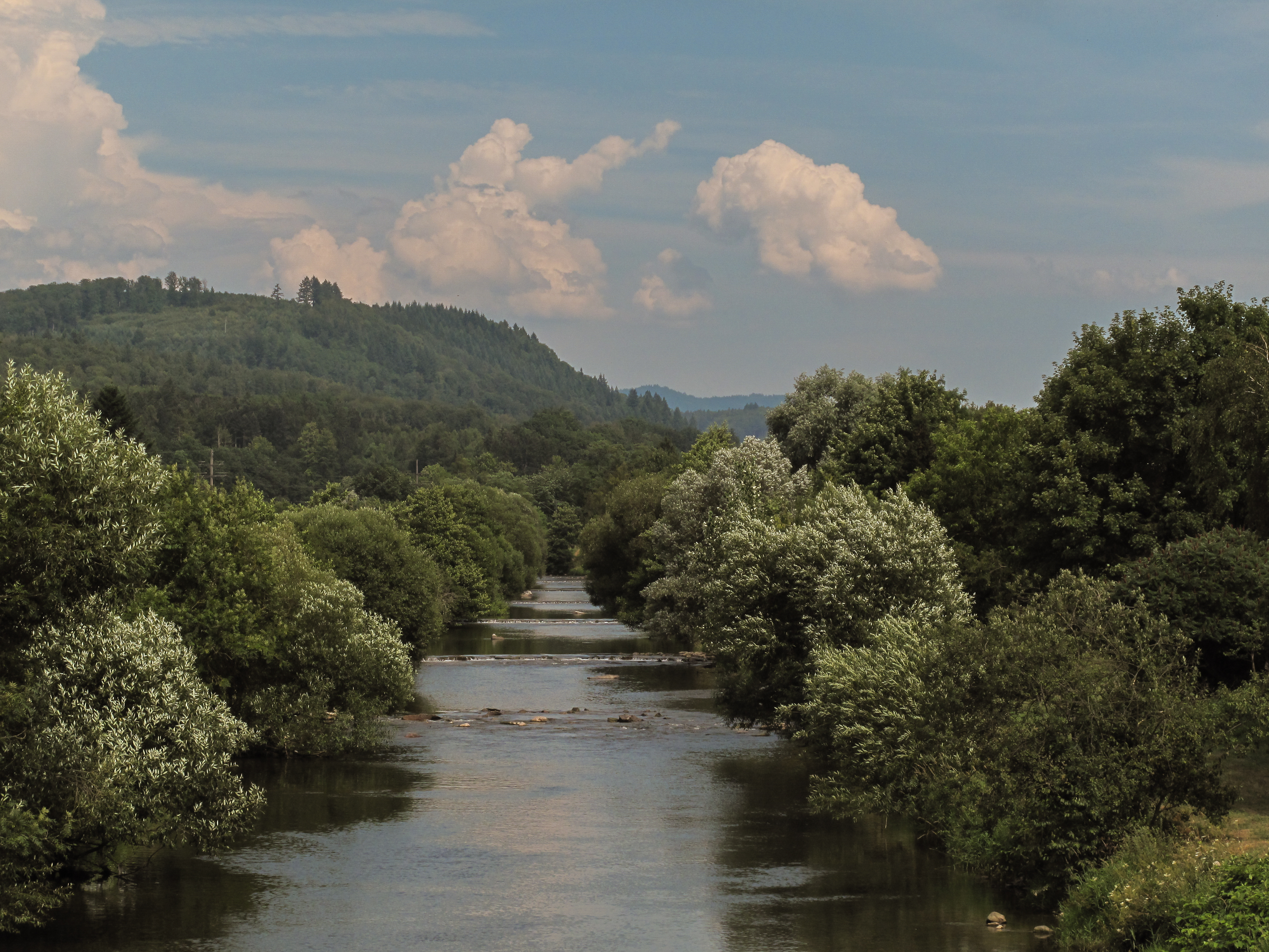
The Wiese near Steinen

The Wiese rises in the Black Forest in the Southern Black Forest Nature Park. Its source, the Wiesenquelle lies in the county of Breisgau-Hochschwarzwald immediately west of the residential area of Hebelhof in the municipality of Feldberg between the Feldberg (1,493 m above sea level (NHN)), the highest mountain in the range, to the northwest and the Grafenmatt (1,377.6 m) to the south-southwest at about 1,218 m. The section of the B 317 from Feldberg Ort via Hebelhof to Todtnau runs past the source a few metres to the north.

The Wiese crosses into the county of Lörrach just below its source. It flows through the Black Forest, initially in a southwest direction along the B 317 through the Wiesental valley. Leaving from the Feldberg, it flows, hemmed in by the steep mountainsides of the High Black Forest, past the hamlets of Fahl and Brandenberg, still as a mountain stream, and through the village of Todtnau. From there it heads to and through Badnau, past Geschwend, through the villages of Utzenfeld, Schönau im Schwarzwald, Wembach, Fröhnd, Mambach, Atzenbach and Zell im Wiesental.

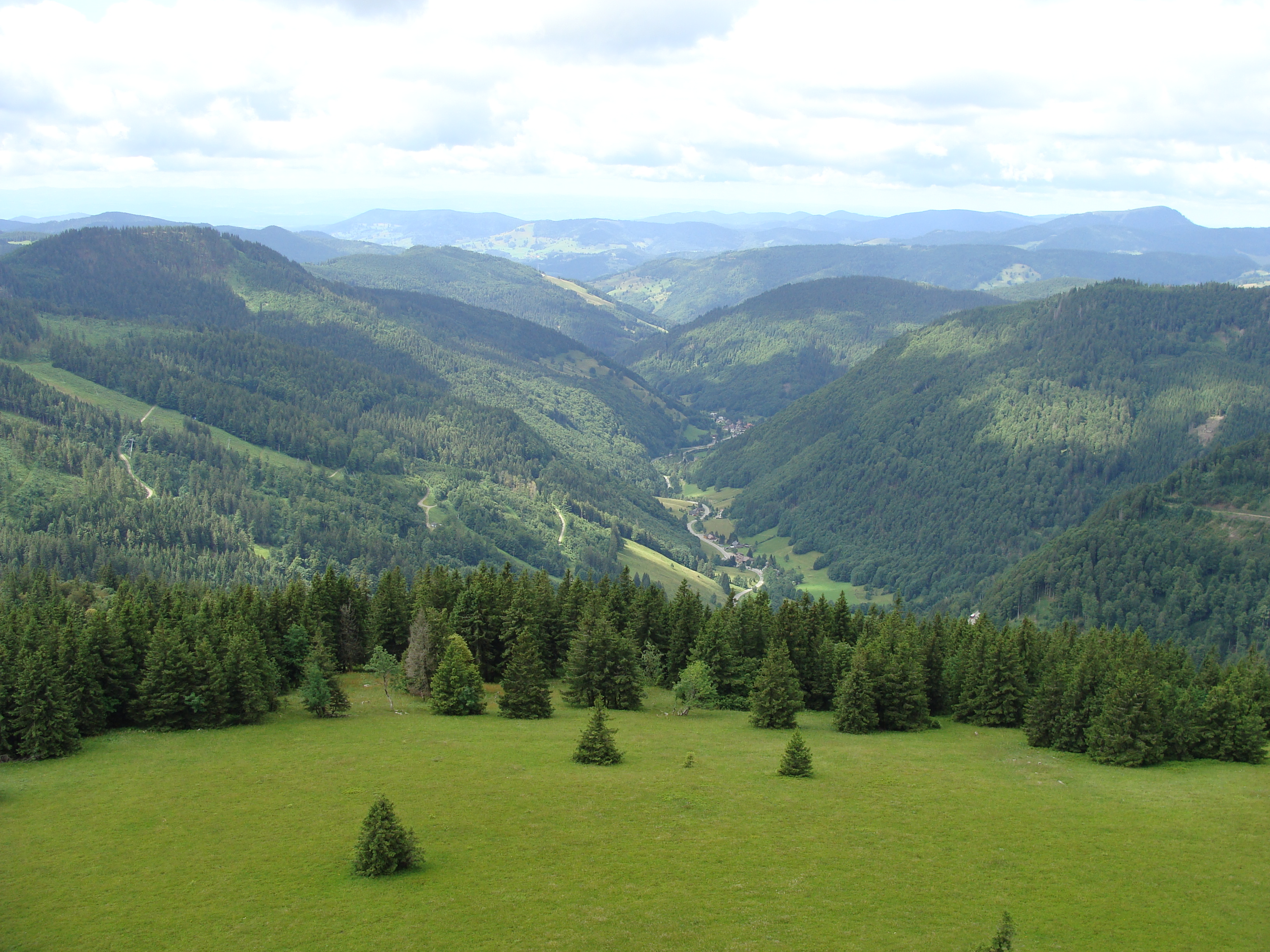
The glacially formed upper valley of the Wiese from Seebuck to the SW

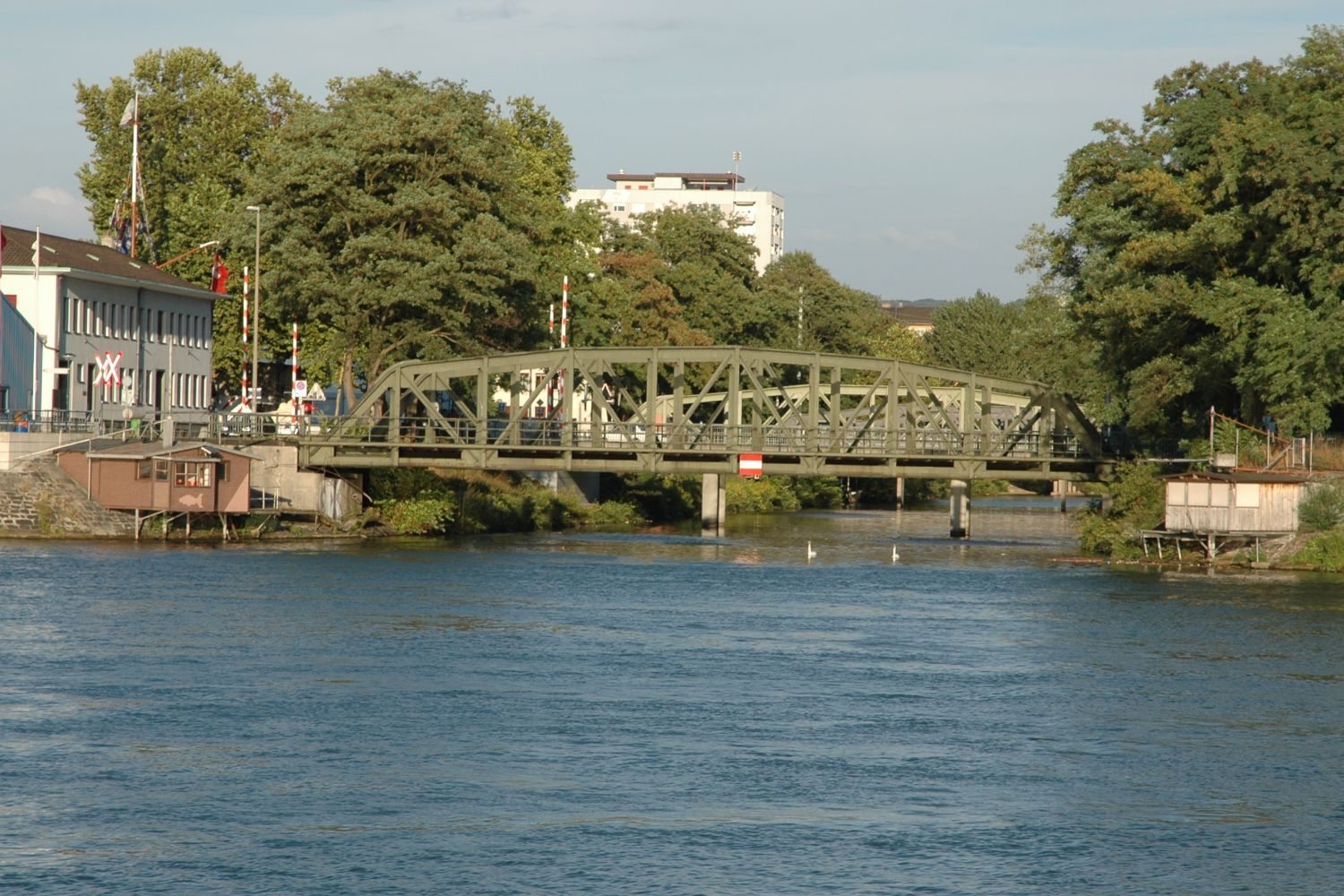
The Wiese empties into the Rhine between the two Basel quarters of Kleinhüningen and Klybeck.

Between Zell and Hausen the narrow Black Forest valley of the Wiese opens up into a wide plain in which the Wiese first passes Fahrnau and then reaches Schopfheim. There it turns westwards and separates the Black Forest from the Dinkelberg.

After flowing through the town of Schopfheim, it passes by or through the villages of Gündenhausen, Maulburg, Höllstein and Steinen, and the Lörrach quarters of Hauingen, Brombach and Haagen, before crossing under the A 98 motorway, then Tumringen, Lörrach itself and Stetten, after which the B 317 turns away from it.

Behind the bridge over the Wiese in Stetten on the Weil am Rhein-Lörrach railway, the Wiese leaves German territory and flows, for its last 6 kilometres, on Swiss soil, initially through the municipality of Riehen. The German municipality of Weil am Rhein, which borders on the north-west of Riehen, does not reach all the way to the Wiese; but a short section of the Mühleteich, a branch of the river, flows through Weil am Rhein. After leaving Riehen, in the district of Kleinbasel, the river crosses under the Karlsruhe–Basel high-speed railway and, shortly thereafter, at the junction of the Swiss A2 and A3, under the A2, which becomes the German A5 motorway a little further to the north.

The Wiese finally enters the Upper Rhine between the Kleinbasel quarters of Klybeck to the south and Kleinhüningen to the north at a height of 244 m above sea level (NN). A little further south the Upper Rhine becomes the High Rhine at the Basel Rhine Knee. Immediately north-northeast of the confluence of the Wiese and the Rhine lies the Basel Rhine port and opposite the confluence to the west on the far side of the Rhine is the French municipality of Huningue.

=== Tributaries ===
The biggest tributary of the Wiese is the Kleine Wiese, which gives its name to the collective municipality of Kleines Wiesental, and which is fed by two headstreams, the Belchenwiese (source on the southern slopes of the Belchen) and the Köhlgartenwiese (rises southwest of the Belchen on the southern slopes of the Köhlgarten), which merge in Tegernau. From there the Kleine Wiese flows southwards and empties into the Große Wiese west of Schopfheim.

The following noteworthy tributaries empty into the Wiese and its main tributaries (entries indicate which side they enter from, the DGKZ, length and catchment::

- upper reaches as far as Todtnau 22.534 km^{2}
- (r) Schönenbach (232–12; 8.487 km, 20.134 km^{2})
- + 5.332 km^{2}
- (l) Prägbach (232–2; 14.654 km, 30.795 km^{2})
- + 2.839 km^{2}
- (r) Wiedenbach (232–32; 7.729 km, 19.869 km^{2})
- (r) Aiternbach (232–332; 7.324 km)
- + 23.507 km^{2}, including the Aiternbach
- (r) Böllenbach (232–34; 7.089 km; 13.204 km^{2})
- + 3.384 km^{2}
- (l) Künabach (232–394; 6.215 km, 10.338 km^{2})
- + 11.943 km^{2}
- (l) Angenbach (232–4; 8.622 km, 22.018 km^{2})
- + 35.813 km^{2}, total 221.7 km^{2}
- (r) Kleine Wiese (232–6; 22.298 km, 91.383 km^{2})
  - upper reaches of the Köhlgartenwiese 5.014 km^{2}
  - (r) Klemmbach (232–6–12; 4.953 km, 7.088 km^{2})
  - + 16.469 km^{2}
  - (r) Riederbächle (232–6–16; 4.621 km; 6.962 km^{2})
  - + 4.303 km^{2}, total to here 39.836 km^{2}
  - (r) Köhlgartenwiese (232–6–2; 10.91 km, 29.969 km^{2})
  - from now on the Kleine Wiese; + 21.578 km^{2}, total 91.383 km^{2}
- + 0.007 km^{2}
- (l) Schlierbach (232–72; 9.728 km, 13.728 km^{2})
- + 4.73 km^{2} (right-hand side)
- (left-hand branch) Gewerbekanal (232–74; 3.873 km, 14.446 km^{2})
  - (left-hand branch from Schlierbach to the Wiese)Floßkanal (232–74–2; 5.544 km)
- + 7.461 km^{2}
- (r) Steinenbach (232–8; 13.683 km; 46.277 km^{2})
  - Upper reaches 19.095 km^{2}
  - (l) Schwammerich (232–8–2; 7.91 km, 11.765 km^{2})
  - + 5.828 km^{2}
  - (r) Heilisaubach (232–8–4; 5.928 km, 8.822 km^{2})
  - + 0.767 km^{2}, total 46.277 km^{2}
- + 53.581 km^{2}, total 453.313 km^{2} at 57.76 km length

=== Catchment ===
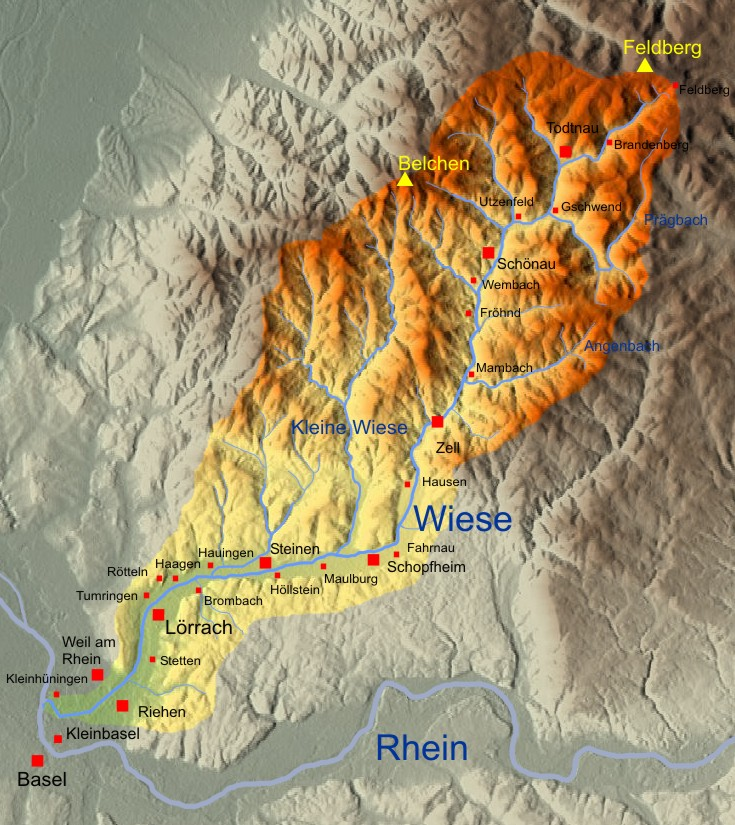
Catchment area and river system of the Wiese

The catchment of the Wiese cover 455 square kilometres and has a fairly uniform width along its typical elongated shape. In its upper reaches the Wiese is fed by various streams, on its right-hand side by, inter alia, the Schönenbach and Wiedenbach, on its left-hand side by the Prägbach and Angenbach. At Maulburg the Kleine Wiese empties into the Wiese. It is the largest and longest tributary and receives about one third of its waters from the Köhlgartenwiese. The last major tributary, the Steinenbach, discharges into it at Hauingen.

== Geomorphology ==
Since the formation of the Black Forest and its foothills during the geological upheavals of the Upper Rhine Graben, the Wiese has shaped the landscapes in the Southern Black Forest and the Dinkelberg through its continuous erosion and sedimentation work. The Wiese flows through two topographically and geologically distinguishable sections, which divide the Wiesental valley into its upper reaches in the valley of the Schwarzwaldwiese between Fahl and Zell, and the Lower Wiesental valley in its lower reaches between Hausen and Kleinhüningen.

In recent earth history, the alternation of warm and cold periods during the Pleistocene has characterized the appearance of the Wiesental. The valley of the Schwarzwaldwiese was formed by the Feldberg Glacier. Only in the upper part between Fahl and Todtnau was the glacier powerful enough to carve out a trough valley into the crystalline basement. The glacial tongue, however, reached as far as Wembach. In the upper reaches, near Todtnau and Gschwend, the Wiese flows in some places through gorge-like valleys with rapids and small waterfalls.

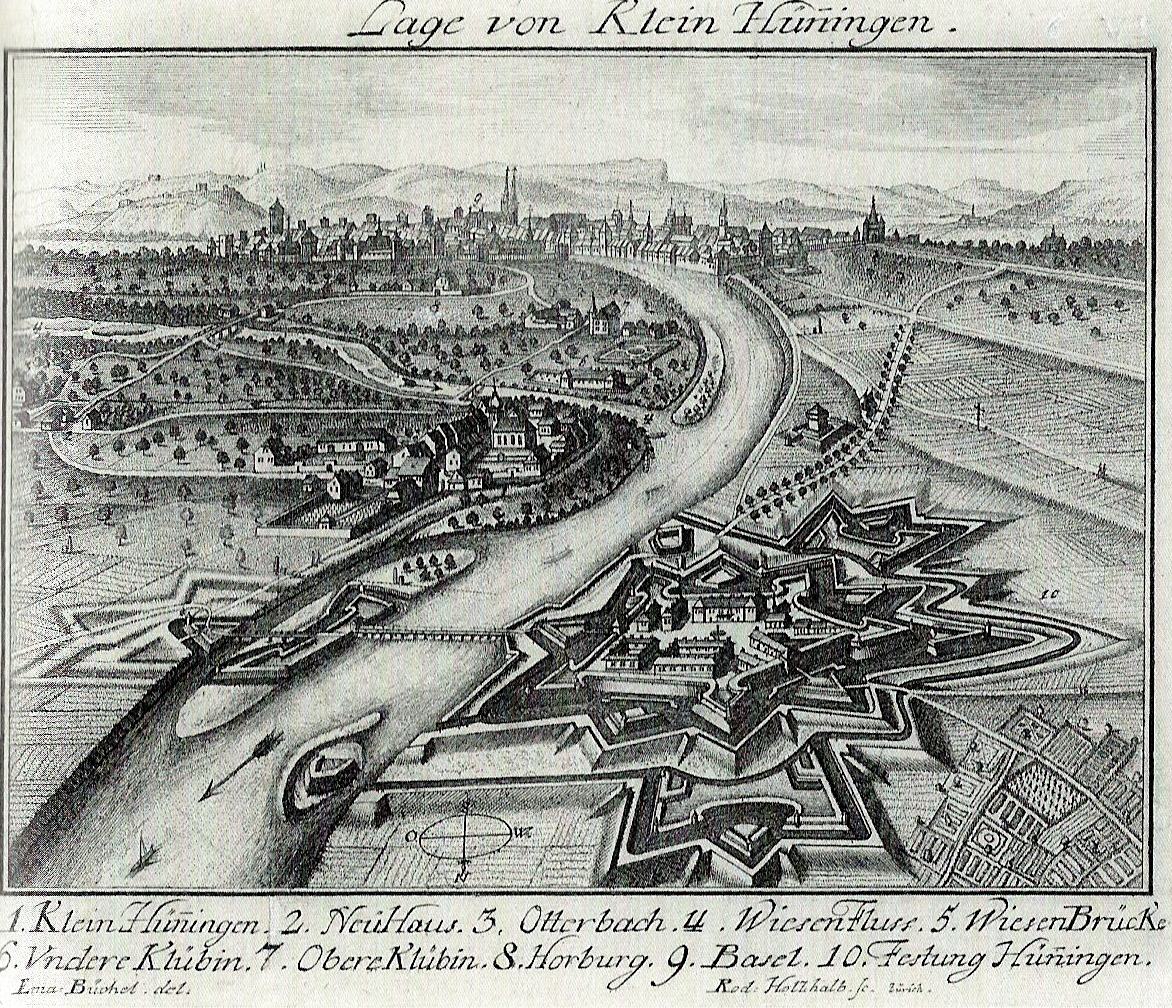
Mouth delta of the Wiese with gravel islands, 1749

After the end of the last ice age, the Würm Glaciation about 10,000 years ago, the lower Wiese valley had been filled by gravel and boulders from the Feldberg Glacier and the valley floor was formed at about 20 to 30 metres above today's level. As a result of the melting of ice age glaciers, large quantities of meltwater were released and the Wiese cut downwards up to 15 metres below today's level. After repeated gravel deposition and the formation of the present river terraces about 2,500 to 6,000 years ago, the Wiese created the present valley floor with its river meadows and broad meanders by further downward erosion. In the area of the Wiese river delta, these ice age river deposits so strongly affected the course of the Rhine that its river bed was pushed about five kilometres to the southwest, where it flows today around the characteristically shaped Rhine Knee (Rheinknie). In Kleinbasel, below the Riehenring bridge, the Wiese was in turn deflected by an existing Nagelfluh gravel bank, which resulted the striking 90° bend in the lower reaches of the Wiese. Up to the beginning of the 19th century, the Wiese flowed largely unregulated from its source in the Black Forest to its mouth on the Rhine, swinging between the scarp of the lower river terrace and carving its way through the gravel and sandbanks of the river meadows. The annual floods frequently resulted in a change in the course of the river.

Only the Wiesewuhre, an artificial watercourse that used water for agriculture, trade and handicrafts, and later for the industries of the Wiesental and Kleinbasel, impeded the course of the Wiese and diverted a not inconsiderable part of the Wiese into the various commercial water canals. In the Wiesental, the term Teich is used as a synonym for artificial canals, along with the Alemannic/Basel German terms Diich and Tych.

== Hydrology ==
The mean annual precipitation within the catchment varies between about 2,000 millimetres in the Feldberg area and 882 millimetres in Lörrach. The amount of precipitation decreases from west to east and from north to south. The greatest precipitation occurs mostly in the months November to January, and, in the Black Forest, mostly as snow.

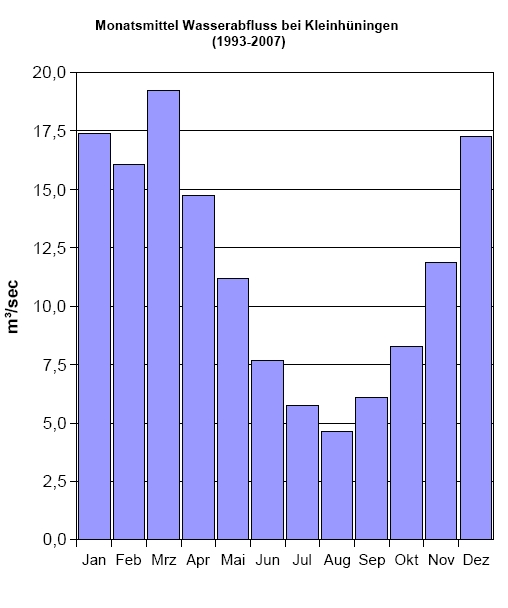
Average monthly water drainage of the Wiese near Kleinhüningen 1993-2007

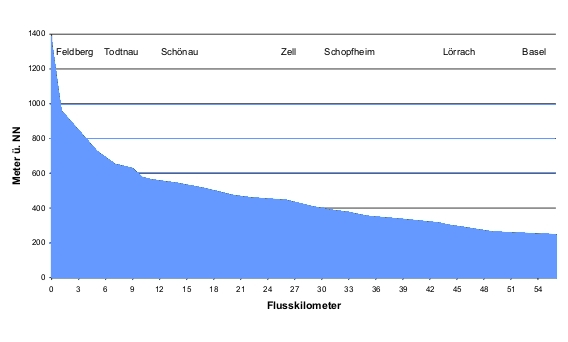
Longitudinal river profile

As a result of the river's low storage capacity in the catchment area in the upper reaches of the Wiese and the combination of sudden snow melts during the föhn and heavy rainfall, flooding used to occur regularly in the past causing great damage to the population, property and the countryside. The increasingly severe floods of the second half of the 19th century were put down by contemporary writers to the ruthless deforestation of woods in the Kleine and Grosse Wiese valleys and the desolate and worthless areas on the Feldberg and Belchen, which were clearly unable to retain the amount of water that they had been able to in the past. Viewed over the year, the Wiese discharges the most water around the Christmas season and from mid-March to mid-April, and the least amount of water in August. The average discharge rate in Kleinhüningen is 11.3 m^{3}/s. The Swiss Federal Office for the Environment measured the highest discharge rate during the period from 1933 to 2006 as 342.5 m^{3}/s in 1944. However, events of this magnitude can be expected only every 200 years.

== Exceptional floods ==
- On 20 February 1999 the Wiese burst its banks near Maulburg after heavy rainfall. Along the Maulburg Wuhr, the river broke out of its riverbed and tore out the flood defences on its right bank to a depth of 30 to 50 metres. River defences were only renovated on the left bank. Today, the gravel banks and sandy beaches around Maulburg, which are surrounded by grassland, have become a popular recreation area.
- The Christmas floods of 22 December 1991, were the worst floods in 25 years with a discharge rate of over 170 m^{3}/s at the measuring station in Basel-Kleinhüningen.
- The flood of 27 November 1944, resulted in a record discharge of 342.5 m^{3}/s, destroying inter alia the Haagen Weir.
- The Christmas flood of 28 December 1882 must have been one of the worst floods in history. Water level calculations have shown that the Wiese in the Riehener Bann forest must have carried up to 450 m^{3}/s of water at its peak. This flood caused serious damage in Riehen and was the trigger for the subsequent implementation of the defensive work in the Lange Erlen. Even upstream, ditches (Wuhre), bridges and bank defences were destroyed. When the Tumring Wiese Bridge collapsed, more than a dozen of the people, who were on the bridge at the time, were killed.
- On the night of 14/15 February 1877, the Wiese burst through the embankment by the Brombach Canal, destroyed the railway embankment, and bypassed Haagen Weir, the left section of which was torn away. Further downstream, the Haagen Bridge was swept away. The Wiese destroyed the entire shore on the Haagen side, until it finally surged against the northern gable wall of the inn Zur Wiese and collapsed it. For the municipality of Haagen, the Wuhr Association (Wuhrgenossenschaft), the meadow owners and the publican of Zur Wiese, the financial loss amounted to hundreds of thousands of marks. What can happen if floodwaters bypass a drainage ditch (Wuhr) may be seen in the photograph of the Maulburg Flood of 1999.

== Wiese correction ==
When the Alemanni began to populate the Wiesental in the fifth and sixth centuries, they chose their settlement places carefully. On the lower terraces of the last ice age, where they settled, the medieval villages were largely spared from floods caused by the Wiese which, at that time could still spread unimpeded across its river meadows. However, with increasing cultivation of the fertile floodplains, the need grew for farmers and landowners to protect valuable land from flooding by the Wiese and to strengthen its banks.

The first indications of flood defence measures being considered can be found in an agreement between the Landvogt of Rötteln and Basle city council on 18 December 1562 about river defences on the Wiese. It concerned a section of the Wiese above the Kleinbasel Teichwuhr. The earliest graphical records of river defences date back to 1750. They show the structural measures taken for the restoration of a section of the Wiese between Weil and Kleinhingen, where the banks had burst.

In Baden, the Wiese was divided into numerous branches and transported much debris with it. This led to repeated flooding of the river meadows. The first large-scale corrections were carried out between Hausen and Stetten between 1806 and 1823, because agriculture, traders and the newly established industrial enterprises in the Baden part of the Lower Wiesental suffered the consequences of the floods far more than the Swiss riverside landowners in Riehen and Basel. The canalisation of the river between Lörrach and Hausen was designed and carried out by Baden water engineer, Johann Gottfried Tulla.

The present course of the Wiese on Swiss territory was already planned in the early 19th century by construction inspector Baader. Interesting is its absolutely straight course between the bridge over the Wiese at Weil and the Iron Bridge. It is parallel to the visual axis of Stetten Church and Basel Minster. The original embankment was a platform system (Bühnensystem), but in the 1850s it was replaced by a threshold system (Schwellungssystem) after the serious flood of 1852. For the river bed, a double trapezoid profile was envisaged, with a summer bed and the flood water embankments. The banks were still largely reinforced with fascines, wattle and grass. Between 1847 and 1878 there were 13 severe floods, all of which led to damage and destruction of the riverbank defences. Only after the great Christmas flood of 1882 was a uniform defensive system built on the Swiss Wiese.

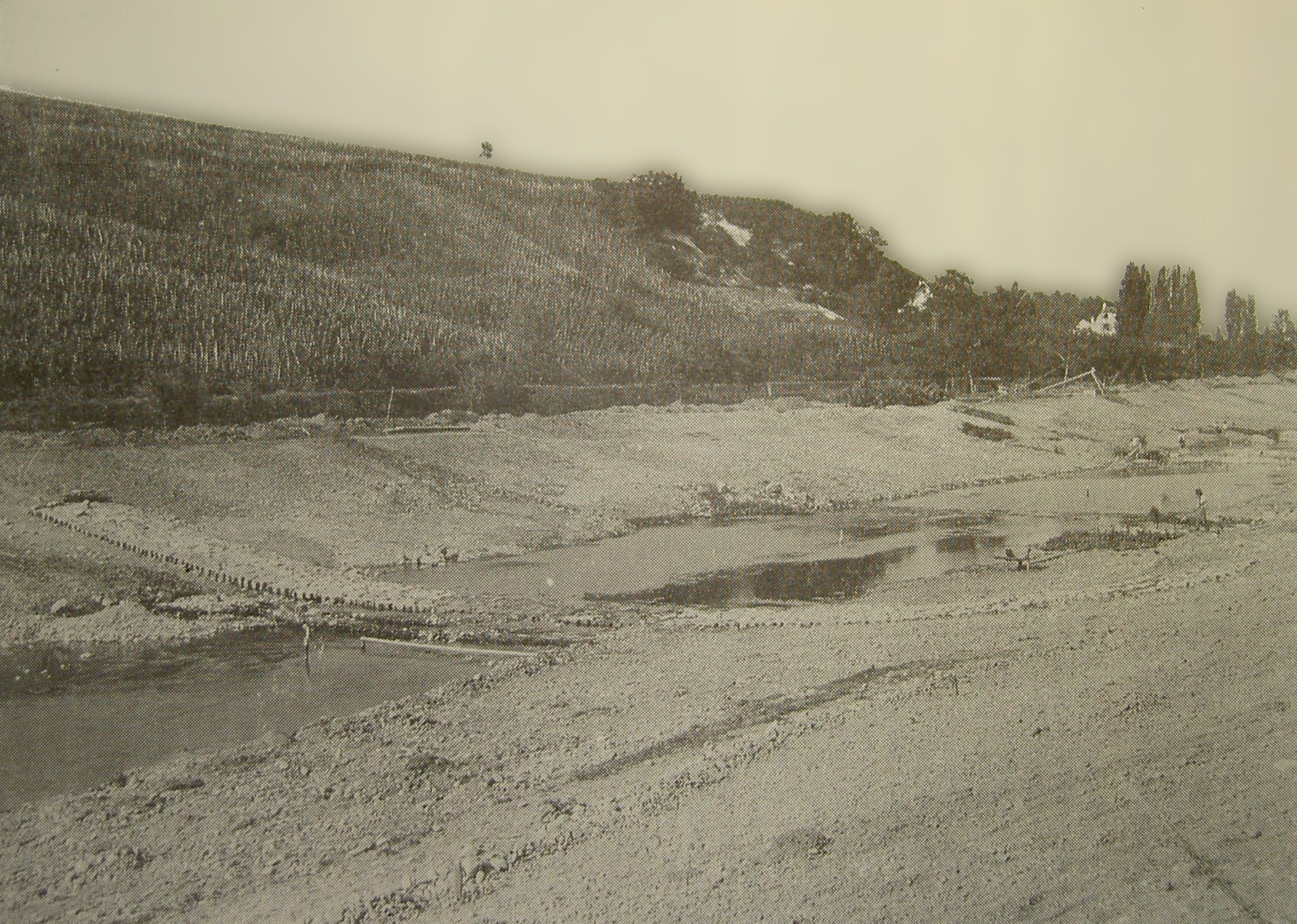
Correction at the Schlipf above the bridge over the Wiese at Weil (1898)

One special feature is the correction carried out in 1898 using the Schindler system between the state border and the Weilstrassen bridge. In this system, the river profile follows a continuous, uninterrupted ground line, which neither receives a separate riverbed nor a separate bank formation. The advantages of this system are intended to be that flood defences would be less damaged during floods and the riverbed could absorb a larger water volume. The Schindler system proved unsatisfactory in the early years so that, between 1905 and 1910, the original wooden defences had to be replaced by stone blockwork. However, thanks to the Schindler's profile, a remarkable river meadow was formed between the state border and the Riehen swimming pool developed over the course of time on the right bank of the Wiese. It was only recently that this conservation-worthy meadow was severely damaged by the building work for the Zollfreienstrasse road.

Corrective measures on the Wiese were hampered in past centuries by various natural circumstances and by human and/or administrative shortcomings. The seasonal floods that occurred and the large amount of debris were always detrimental to the riverbank defences and height of the riverbed and thus on the capacity of the river bed. The corrective measures carried out in the Baden part of the Wiese resulted in an increased discharge of the floodwater into the Swiss area and thus imposed a greater load on the local flood defences. The lack of willingness on the part of individual river owners to cover the costs of necessary maintenance work prevented the long-term correction of longer river sections. Only after the formation of the so-called state association in Baden and the takeover of the river route in the Riehener Bann by the canton of Basel could long-term defences on the Wiese be ensured. Once the Wiese was confined to the artificial bed along the entire stretch between Hausen and Kleinhüningen, it largely lost its awe. Major floods have since been contained within its banks. Not until recently has there been increasing consideration of reversing some of the rigid and unnatural grasslands.

== Water usage and economic factors ==
The Wiese has probably been used for agricultural, fishing and commerce since the settlement of the Wiesental by the Alemanni and, from the 18th century, for industrial purposes.

=== Fishing ===
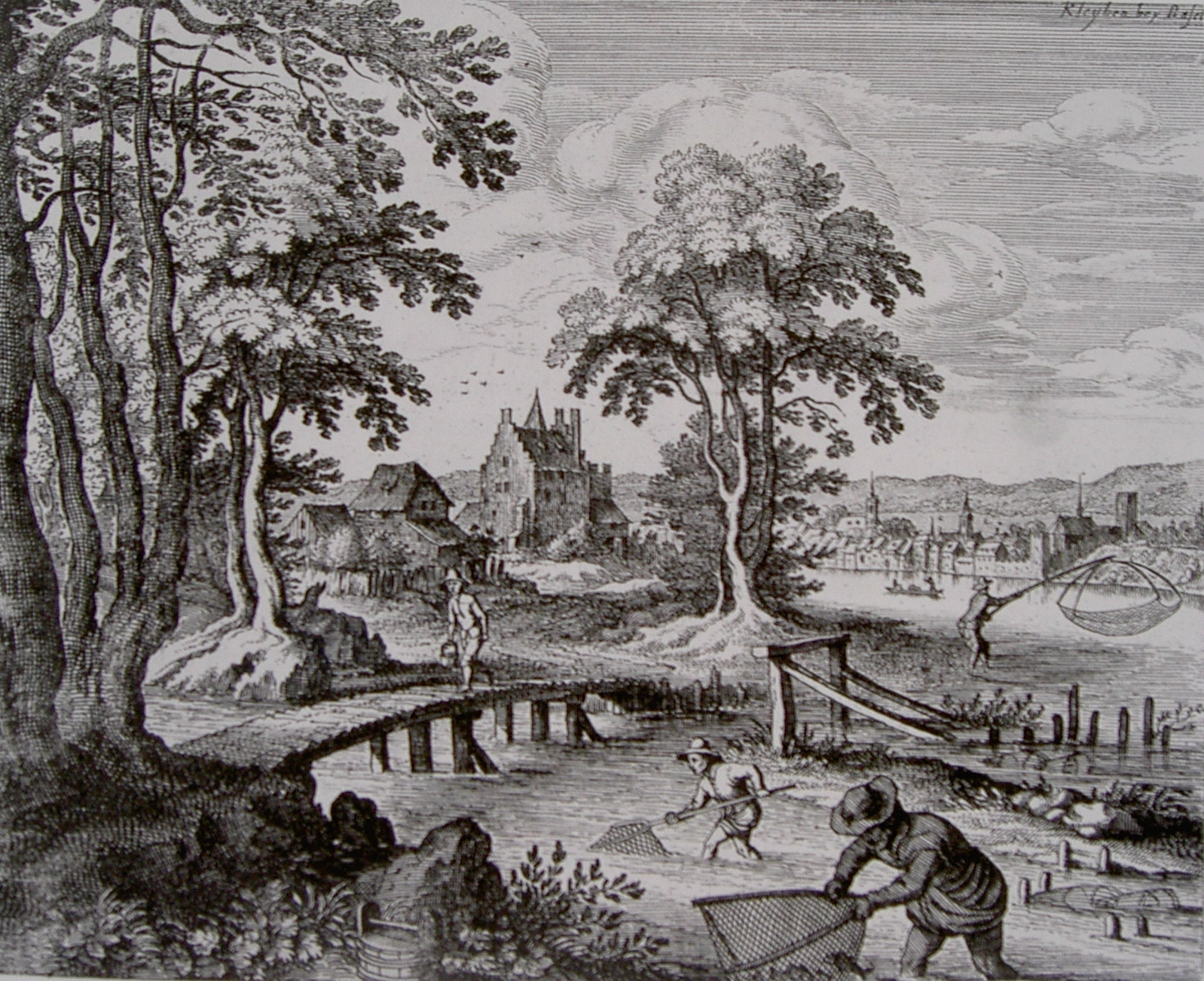
The mouth of the Wiese at Kleinhüningen. In this picture, fishermen can be seen at work with dip nets, fish traps and fishing nets. In the background is the Klybeck Castle and Basle

The Wiese has been very a rich fishing river since time immemorial. Its numerous side branches, gravelly river bed, shady riparian woods and flow conditions provided optimal conditions for fish and other aquatic life. Many chronicles refer to the variety and quantity of salmon. In the Early Middle Ages the fishing grounds were still accessible to everyone, but no later than the implementation of royal rights by the Frankish kings, was the fishery (Fischweid) established, whereupon the general use of the river by the population was forbidden.

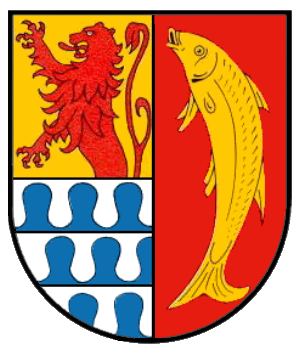
On the municipal coat of arms of Haagen, the fish recalls the privilege of the court fishermen of Rötteln and Haagen when royal fishing rights allowed them to fish the waters owned by the Vogtei of Rötteln.

In the 15th century, the margraves of Rötteln granted all fishing rights from Hausen to Kleinhüningen (with the exception of Stetten). Particularly rich in fish was the mouth of the Wiese at Kleinhüningen. The Basel and Huningue fishermen also knew this, so that there was frequent quarreling in the estuary, as in the Salmon War of 1736/37. Fishing rights were very strictly regulated. Fishermen had to take account of the closed season, minimum sizes, boundaries and water use rights of the mills and timber rafting industry. In the Middle Ages, the Wiesenwuhre, which had to be opened for the passage of the salmon during the migration season, also presented a major problem.

In the first half of the twentieth century, full-time fishing was abandoned. High levels of water pollution, the canalisation of the Wiese and the construction of un-bypassable power stations on the Rhine destroyed the habitat and the migration routes of many aquatic animals and thus the economic basis of fishing. Today only the old fishermen's family of Bürgin in Kleinhüningen still has the old fishery licence, and in Haagen the golden fish in their coat of arms recalls the former privilege allowing the Rötteln royal fishing rights to be exercised. Since the water quality was restored, various regional fishing associations are looking after fish stocks and raising juvenile river trout. In addition, they contribute significantly to the maintenance of the Wiese and other watercourses in the Wiesental as part of joint river cleaning activities.

=== Mill ponds, aqueducts and irrigation ===
In addition to the fishermen, the water-dependent trades were dependent on the Wiese. However, due to the dynamics of the river and the fact that it was still unconfined to its course in the Middle Ages, it was relatively difficult to use the water power of the Wiese for water mills, saw mills or smithies. With the increasing reclamation of the meadows during the Middle Ages and the growing importance of livestock farming in agriculture, the newly established meadows on the floodplain and their irrigation became an economic factor. To utilise the water of the river, from the Late Middle Ages it was diverted at weirs, known locally as Wuhre, and guided through artificial channels, known locally as Teiche, to the farms and the meadows, using the routes of old river arms.

In the first half of the 13th century, the bishops of Basle had a political interest in the planned settlements of [Kleinbasel (Kleinbasel still belonged at that time to Breisgau), but above all an economic one. As the tributaries and commercial ditches left of the Rhine could no longer meet the growing demand for hydropower and water, the construction of artificial ditches in Kleinbasel helped to sustain trade in the Kleinbasel area. Around 1280, the water system was divided into 12 separate ditches. It was later called Riehenteich.

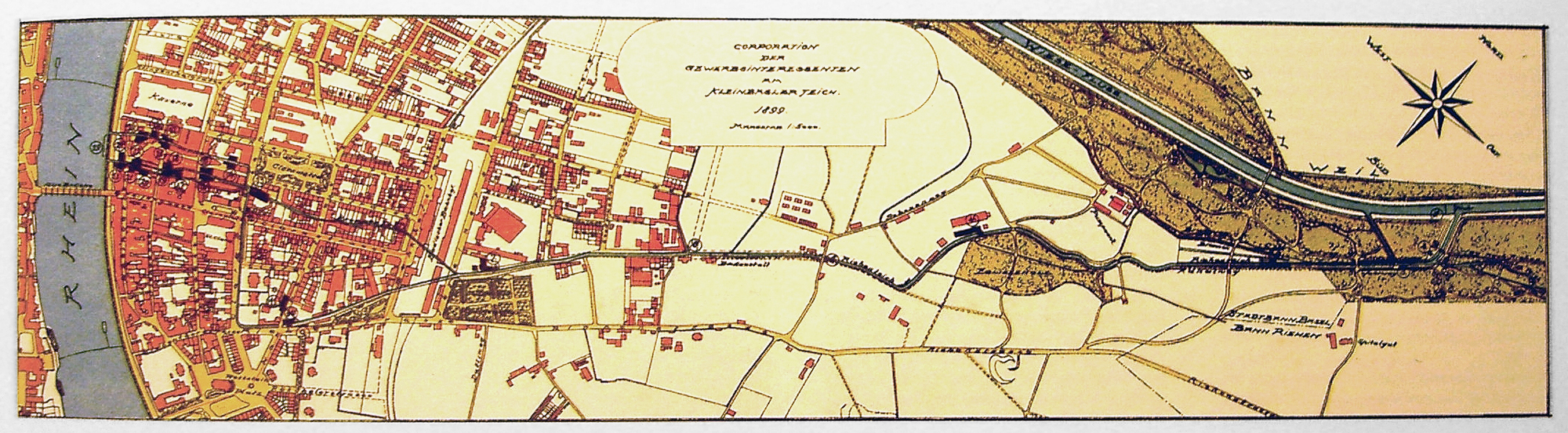
The Kleinbasler Teiche on an 1899 location map

Until 1900 the Kleinhüninger Mühleteich and the Klybeckteich also supplied local industries west of the Lange Erlen with water.

The aqueducts on the territories of Lörrach, Stetten and Riehen ran in the former streambeds of the side branches of the Wiese in which small streams on the edge of the tread of the lowest terrace (Hochgestade). In Riehen the Alte Teich is recorded as early as 1262. The Alte and Neue Teich were originally smaller branches of the Wiese. The water of the Riehener Mühleteich was taken off the Wiese at the "Wuhr" near Stetten. Its need for frequent repairs and conflicts with the villagers of Stetten ultimately led to the collapse of the ditch in 1814, especially as there was now a direct connection to the Stetten industrial zone. After long periods of dryness the Riehener Teich was combined with Kleinbasler Teich around 1723.

Management was hampered by conflicts over rights of use and maintenance, frequent floods and the various responsibilities of the authorities. Thus, the Wehr of the Baden's Weil was located on Basel soil, the Riehener Wehr on Stetten's territory and thus on Anterior Austrian soil, and Stetten received its water from the Lörracher Gewerbeteich and thus from Baden. Further upstream, between Zell and Lörrach, small side branches of the Wiese were developed into mill ponds in the Middle Ages, from which small canals were derived for the irrigation of the meadows. Between Haagen and Tumringen was the canal of Haagener Mühleteich or Röttler Teich. Haagen and Rötteln owe the establishment of spinning and weaving mills to the existence of the Mühlenteich aqueduct.

The former Steinen Mühleteich has been recorded since the 14th century, and ran from the present Steinen Waterworks through Steinen to just before Brombach. In the Middle Ages, the aqueduct supplied water power for mills and sawmills, as well as water for water meadows and cattle. Rights of use and obligations were regulated by the articles of association of the Wuhr Association (Wuhrgenossenschaft). There were further conflicts of use after the Basle-based manufacturer, Major Geigy-Lichtenhahn, established a mechanical spinning and weaving mill on the outskirts of the village in 1834. After the Second World War, interest in the use of the water from the Wiese decreased strongly, not least because the water meadows had to give way to new housing areas and many textile companies had run into economic difficulties. In 1984, the 400-year-old aqueduct was filled in. Today, the Mill Route and the line of the old channel west of the Steinen hydroelectric power station witness to the old aqueduct.

=== Timber rafting ===
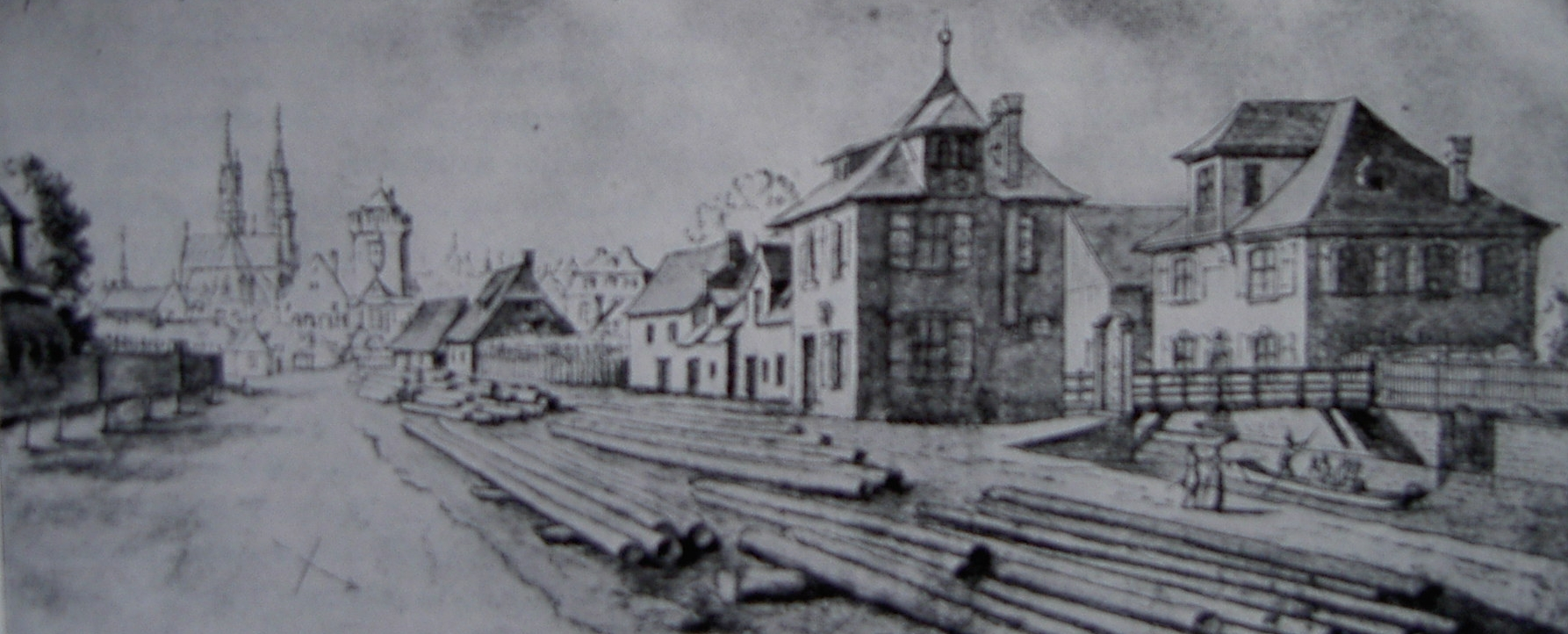
Woodyard at the Kleinbasler Riehentor

Apart from powering water mills and providing irrigation, the Wiese has been used since the 14th/15th century to transport timber from the Black Forest. It was once again the city of Basel which developed the timber resources of the Black Forest as a result of the economic boom in the printing and paper industry. Through contracts with the margraves, the city of Basel secured annual imports of wood. The rafting season was March and April, when the Wiese had enough water during the snow melt. In the 18th century the strong demand from Basel led to a major timber boom in the Black Forest. For timber rafting, a 6-foot-wide canal was built, down which more than 7,000 klafters of wood (equivalent to about 14,700 cubic metres) was transported to Basel every year.

The unrestrained timber demand from Basel led to considerable economic imbalances and less sustainable forestry in the Wiesental, which then led to various bureaucratic bans on timber and coal exports. It was only in the late 18th century that rafting ceased in the Wiesental.

== See also ==
- List of rivers of Germany
- List of rivers of Switzerland

== Bibliography ==
- Eduard Golder: Die Wiese. Ein Fluss und seine Geschichte, Construction departement of Basel-Stadt, Department of Civil Engineering, 1991.
