= Rhine knee =

Name of several bends in the Rhine River

The Rhine knee or Rhine's knee (German: Rheinknie, pronounced [ˈʁaɪnˌkniː]) is the name of several distinctive bends in the course of the river Rhine.

== Basel ==
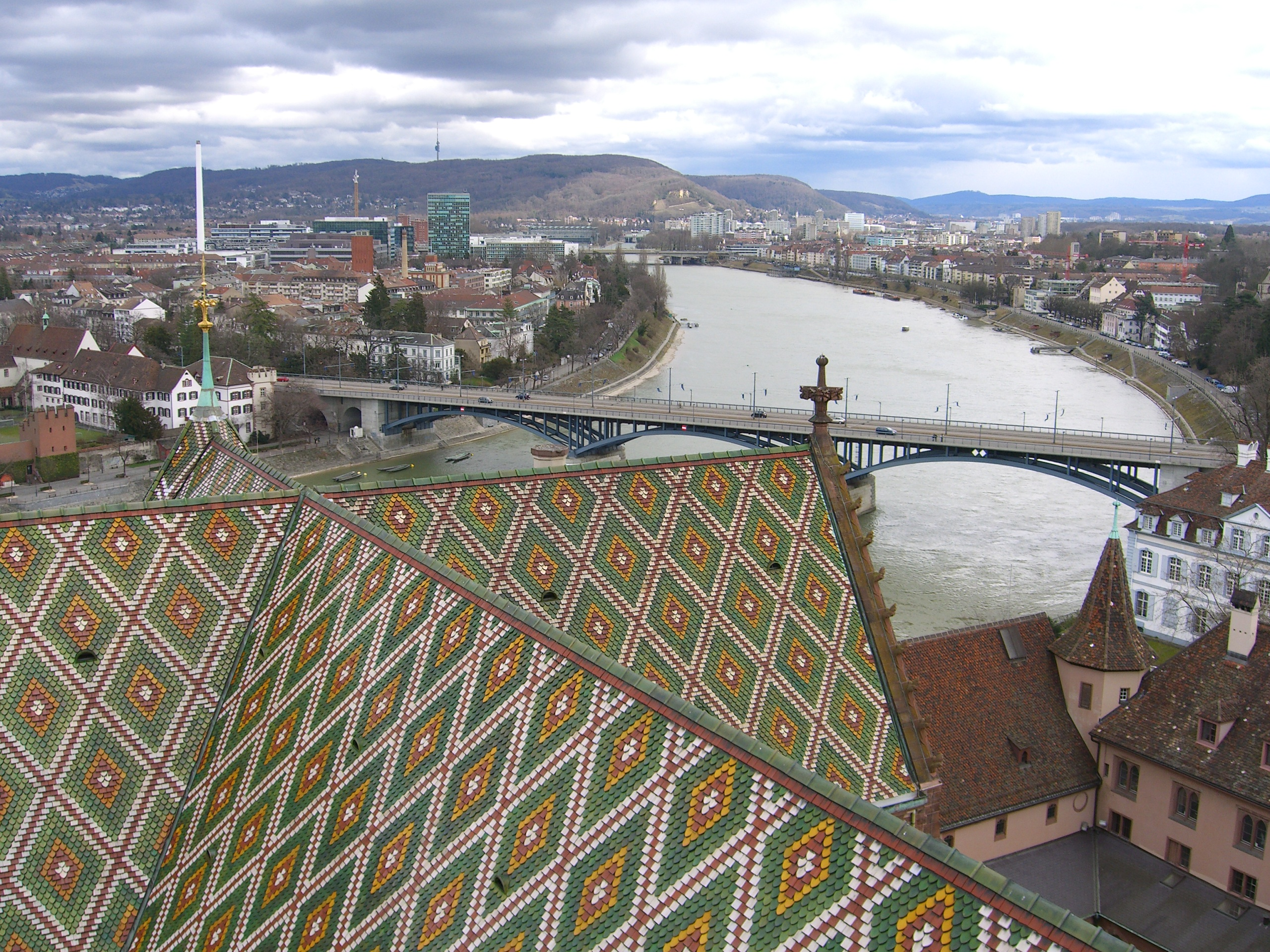
Rhine knee, view from Basel Minster

In Basel, the Rhine changes its westerly direction of flow in an angle of 90 degrees to a northerly direction, along the borders of France and Germany, to flow to the North Sea. From a political viewpoint, the Rhine knee is near the tripoint of France, Germany and Switzerland. Therefore, this region is called Regio TriRhena. The Basel knee separates the High Rhine from the Upper Rhine section.

The whole Rhine knee lies within Swiss territory and is settled by the city of Basel and its adjacent municipalities Riehen and Bettingen. Farther north are the German cities of Lörrach and Weil am Rhein as well as the French towns Huningue and Saint Louis.

The Basel knee arose in the last glacial period (Würm glaciation), when the river flowed directly from today's Grenzach-Wyhlen west of the city to the area of Weil am Rhein in the north. The northern Wiese tributary transported large rubble and gravel sediments from the Feldberg glacier into the Rhine Valley, enforcing the river's characteristic bend to the south.

== Bingen ==
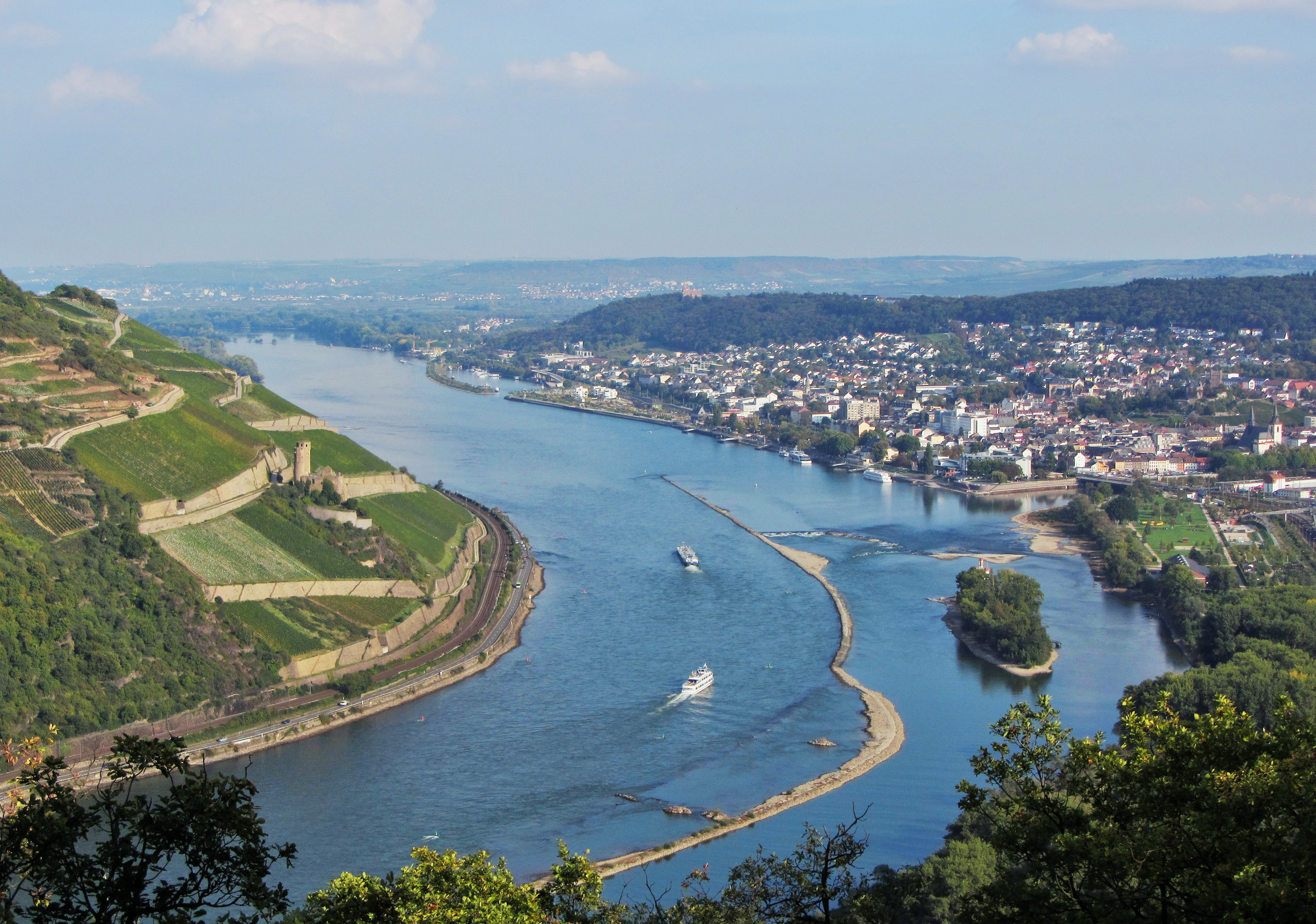
Bingen Hole

The Upper Rhine again changes its flow direction from west to north at another bend near the German town of Bingen and the mouth of the Nahe tributary. Coming here from the city of Mainz, parallel to the crest of the Rhenish Massif, the turn to the north at Bingen marks the opening of a water gap between the Hunsrück mountain range in the west and the Taunus in the east, stretching up to Koblenz in the north and separating the Upper from the Middle Rhine.

The Rhine narrows at the site are called Bingen Hole (Binger Loch), marked by the Mouse Tower on an island in the river and uphill Ehrenfels Castle. Until several blasting operations in the 19th century, an underwater reef of quartzite was a great threat to ship transport.

== Düsseldorf ==
There is also a bridge in Düsseldorf called "Rhine knee bridge".
