= Wieden (Lörrach) =

- Municipality
- Coat of arms

- Location of Wieden within Lörrach district
- Interactive map of Wieden
- Location within Germany Location within Baden-Württemberg
- Coordinates: 47°50′27″N 07°52′54″E
- Country: Germany
- State: Baden-Württemberg
- Admin. region: Freiburg
- District: Lörrach
- Municipal assoc.: Schönau im Schwarzwald

Area
  - Total: 12.25 km^{2} (4.73 sq mi)
- Elevation: 828 m (2,717 ft)

Population (2025-12-31)
  - Total: 573
  - Density: 46.8/km^{2} (121/sq mi)
- Time zone: UTC+01:00 (CET)
  - Summer (DST): UTC+02:00 (CEST)
- Postal codes: 79695
- Dialling codes: 07673
- Vehicle registration: LÖ
- Website: www.wieden.de

Wieden (German pronunciation: [ˈviːdn̩]) is a municipality in the district of Lörrach in Baden-Württemberg in Germany.
