= Schönau im Schwarzwald (Gemeindeverwaltungsverband) =

- Gemeindeverwaltungsverband
- Location of Schönau im Schwarzwald within Lörrach district
- Interactive map of Schönau im Schwarzwald
- Location within Germany Location within Baden-Württemberg
- Coordinates: 47°47′N 7°54′E
- Country: Germany
- State: Baden-Württemberg
- Admin. region: Freiburg
- District: Lörrach
- Seat: Schönau im Schwarzwald
- Subdivisions: 9 municipalities

Area
  - Total: 78.72 km^{2} (30.39 sq mi)

Population (2025-12-31)
  - Total: 5,492
  - Density: 69.77/km^{2} (180.7/sq mi)
- Time zone: UTC+01:00 (CET)
  - Summer (DST): UTC+02:00 (CEST)
- Website: www.gvvschoenau.de

Schönau im Schwarzwald is a Gemeindeverwaltungsverband in the district of Lörrach in Baden-Württemberg, Germany. The seat of the Gemeindeverwaltungsverband is in Schönau im Schwarzwald.

The Gemeindeverwaltungsverband Schönau im Schwarzwald consists of the following municipalities:

1. Aitern
2. Böllen
3. Fröhnd
4. Schönau im Schwarzwald
5. Schönenberg
6. Tunau
7. Utzenfeld
8. Wembach
9. Wieden
