= Sarah Hagmann =

German politician (born 1985)

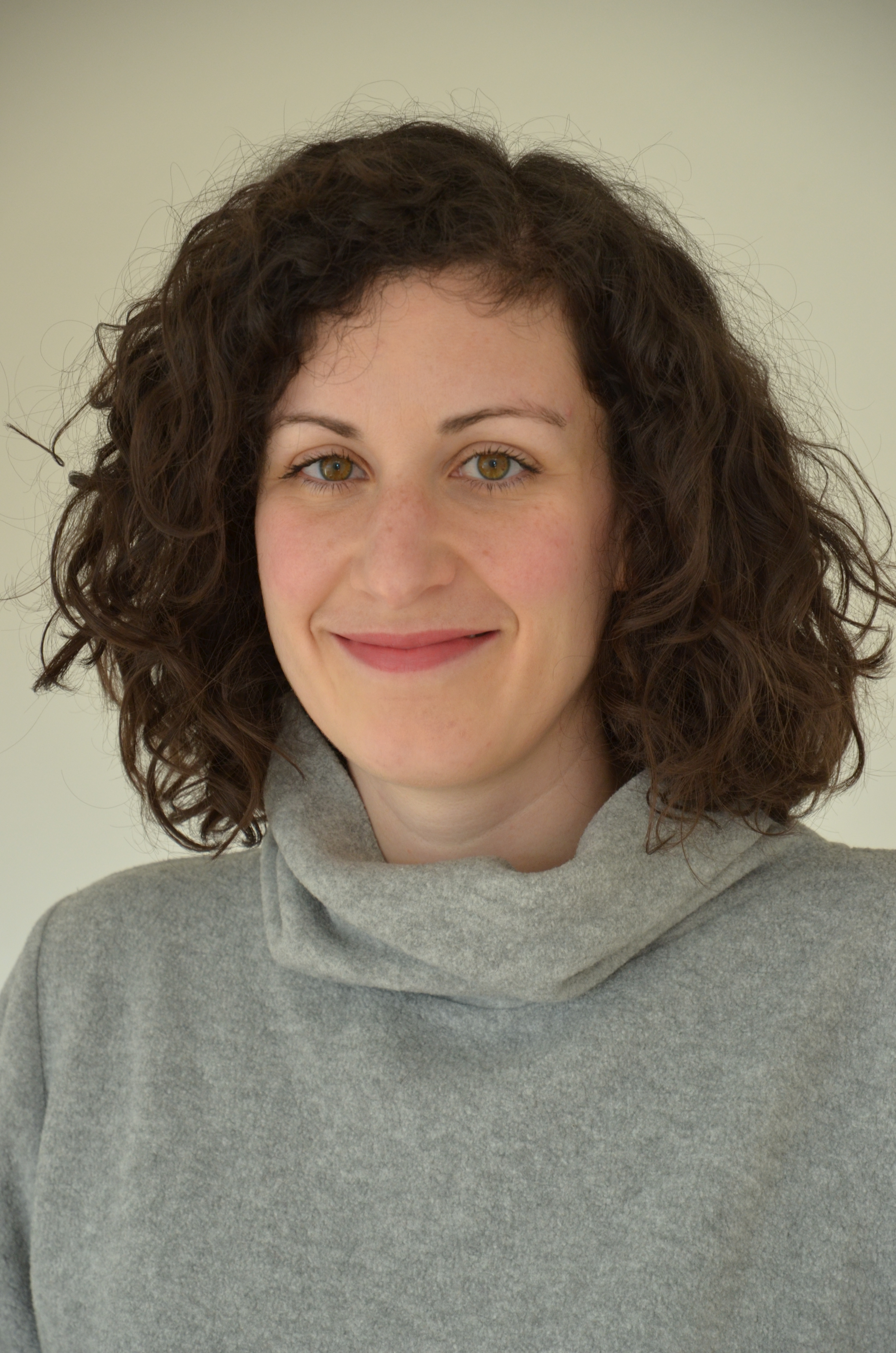
- Hagmann in 2020

Member of the Landtag of Baden-Württemberg
- Incumbent
- Assumed office 1 January 2024
- Preceded by: Josha Frey
- Constituency: Lörrach

Personal details
- Born: 30 December 1985 (age 40)
- Party: Alliance 90/The Greens (since 2017)

Sarah Hagmann (born 30 December 1985) is a German politician serving as a member of the Landtag of Baden-Württemberg since 2024. She has served as deputy group leader of Alliance 90/The Greens since 2026.
