= Utzenfeld =

- Municipality
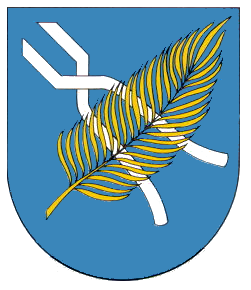
- Coat of arms

- Location of Utzenfeld within Lörrach district
- Interactive map of Utzenfeld
- Location within Germany Location within Baden-Württemberg
- Coordinates: 47°48′03″N 07°54′52″E
- Country: Germany
- State: Baden-Württemberg
- Admin. region: Freiburg
- District: Lörrach
- Municipal assoc.: Schönau im Schwarzwald

Government
  - Mayor (2021–29): Martin Wietzel

Area
  - Total: 7.4 km^{2} (2.9 sq mi)
- Elevation: 561 m (1,841 ft)

Population (2025-12-31)
  - Total: 607
  - Density: 82/km^{2} (210/sq mi)
- Time zone: UTC+01:00 (CET)
  - Summer (DST): UTC+02:00 (CEST)
- Postal codes: 79694
- Dialling codes: 07673
- Vehicle registration: LÖ
- Website: www.utzenfeld.de

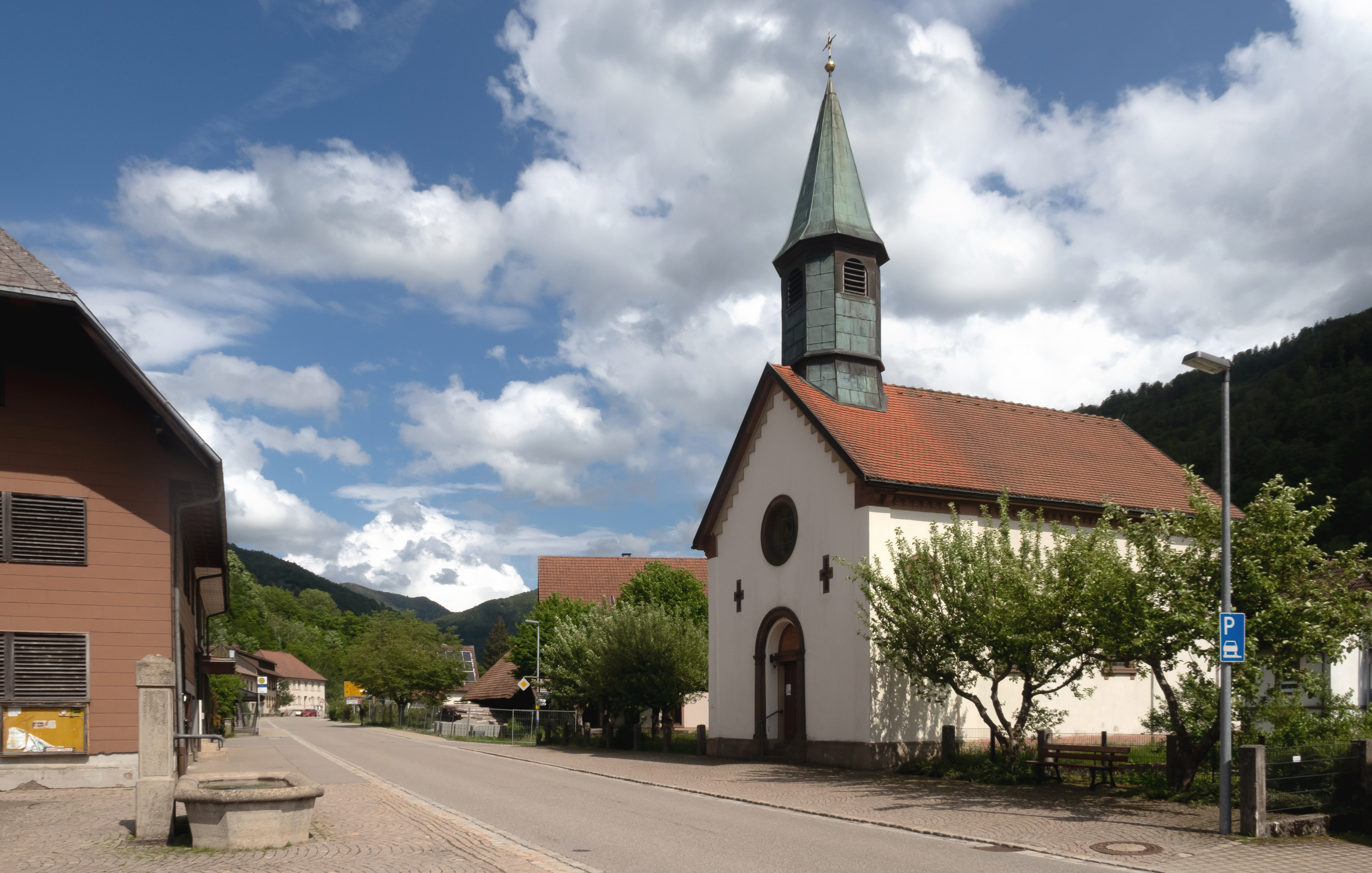
Chapel: die Sankt Apollonia Kapelle

Utzenfeld (German pronunciation: [ˈʊtsn̩fɛlt]; Alemannic German: Utzefäld) is a municipality in the district of Lörrach in Baden-Württemberg in Germany.

== Geography ==
Utzenfeld is a community in the Black Forest (Schwarzwald) in Baden-Württemberg. It is a member of the Schönau Community Administration Association in the Black Forest. The elevation of Utzenfeld ranges from 560 meters, up to 1,124 meters in the upper meadow valley of the Südschwarzwald nature reserve.

=== Neighboring communities ===
The community borders on Wieden in the north, the city of Todtnau in the east, Tunau and the city of Schönau in Schwarzwald in the south, and Aitern in the west.

=== Community arrangement ===
The community of Utzenfeld includes Utzenfeld Village and Zinken Königshütte, extending partially to Wiedener Gebiet.

== History ==
Utzenfeld was clearly identified for the first time in 1294. It belonged to the cloister of St. Blasien then, and later, by 1368, was part of Vorderösterreich. When the cloister was secularized in 1806, the village became part of the newly created Großherzogtum Baden. Utzenfeld became an independent community in 1809.

== Religions ==
Since Vorderösterreich was part of the Reformation, most of the local people belong to the Roman Catholic Church at Schönau, but there is also a "Gotteshaus" in Utzenfeld. The limited number of Protestants in the area also go to Schönau.

== Politics ==
Since 1971, Utzenfeld has belonged to the Schönau community administration association.

=== Local council ===
Christian Democratic Union (Germany) 53.1% - 4 seats
Free Voters 46.9% - 4 seats

== Culture and sights ==
=== Natural features ===
The Utzenfluh nature reserve, opened in 1940, contains many natural attractions.

== Economy and infrastructure ==
The community is the home of several large plastic manufacturers, for example FRISETTA polymer (part of the Nilit Plastics Division), which is one of the largest toothbrush manufacturers in Germany.

From 1889 to 1966, Utzenfeld was connected to the local rail network.

== Education ==
There are no schools in Utzenfeld. Primary school students attend the elementary school in Wieden. The students above the fifth grade attend the Schönau upper school in Schwarzwald, Zell in Wiesental or the higher school in Schönau. The Utzenfluh kindergarten is available for the youngest inhabitants of the community.
