= Wittlingen =

- Municipality
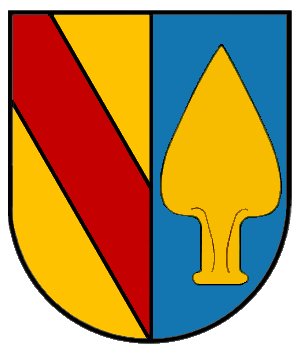
- Coat of arms

- Location of Wittlingen within Lörrach district
- Interactive map of Wittlingen
- Location within Germany Location within Baden-Württemberg
- Coordinates: 47°39′19″N 7°38′59″E
- Country: Germany
- State: Baden-Württemberg
- Admin. region: Freiburg
- District: Lörrach
- Municipal assoc.: Vorderes Kandertal

Government
  - Mayor (2015–23): Michael Herr

Area
  - Total: 4.5 km^{2} (1.7 sq mi)
- Elevation: 304 m (997 ft)

Population (2025-12-31)
  - Total: 936
  - Density: 210/km^{2} (540/sq mi)
- Time zone: UTC+01:00 (CET)
  - Summer (DST): UTC+02:00 (CEST)
- Postal codes: 79599
- Dialling codes: 07621
- Vehicle registration: LÖ

Wittlingen (German pronunciation: [ˈvɪtlɪŋən]; Alemannic German: Wittlige) is a municipality in the southwestern German state of Baden-Württemberg, part of the district Lörrach.

The coat of arms of Wittlingen was granted 1906 and shows the arms of Baden impaled by a plow iron as a symbol for the agricultural character of the town. The blazon is Or a Bend Gules impaling Azure a Plowshare Or point upwards.

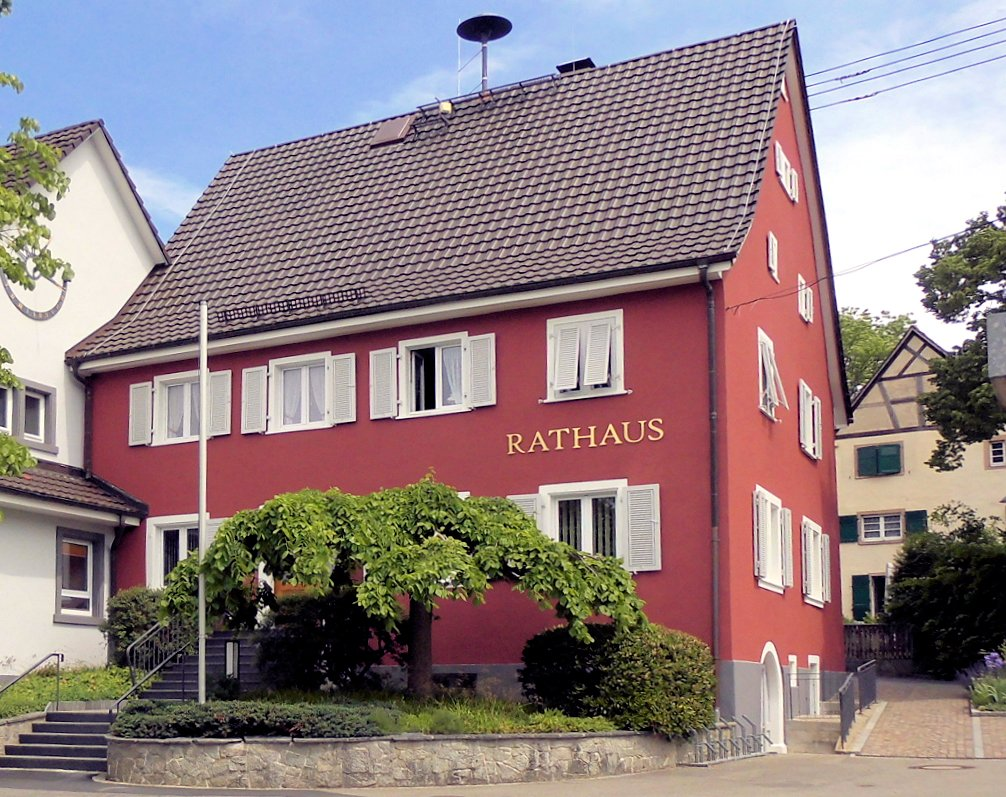
Wittlingen Town hall
