= Schönenberg, Baden-Württemberg =

Schönenberg
- Municipality
- Coat of arms

- Location of Schönenberg within Lörrach district
- Interactive map of Schönenberg
- Location within Germany Location within Baden-Württemberg
- Coordinates: 47°47′34″N 07°52′57″E
- Country: Germany
- State: Baden-Württemberg
- Admin. region: Freiburg
- District: Lörrach
- Municipal assoc.: Schönau im Schwarzwald

Area
  - Total: 7.43 km^{2} (2.87 sq mi)
- Elevation: 680 m (2,230 ft)

Population (2025-12-31)
  - Total: 334
  - Density: 45.0/km^{2} (116/sq mi)
- Time zone: UTC+01:00 (CET)
  - Summer (DST): UTC+02:00 (CEST)
- Postal codes: 79677
- Dialling codes: 07673
- Vehicle registration: LÖ
- Website: www.79677-schoenenberg.de

Schönenberg (German pronunciation: [ˈʃøːnənbɛʁk]) is a municipality in the district of Lörrach in Baden-Württemberg in Germany. The convent within the village is a popular pilgrimage site for Roman Catholics.
