= Fröhnd =

- Municipality
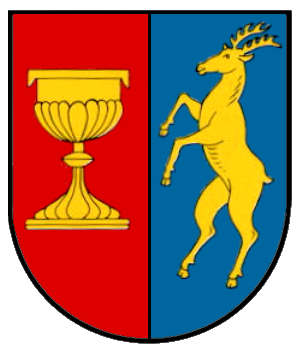
- Coat of arms

- Location of Fröhnd within Lörrach district
- Interactive map of Fröhnd
- Location within Germany Location within Baden-Württemberg
- Coordinates: 47°45′30″N 07°53′03″E
- Country: Germany
- State: Baden-Württemberg
- Admin. region: Freiburg
- District: Lörrach
- Municipal assoc.: Schönau im Schwarzwald

Government
  - Mayor (2020–28): Michael Engesser

Area
  - Total: 16.19 km^{2} (6.25 sq mi)
- Elevation: 554 m (1,818 ft)

Population (2025-12-31)
  - Total: 485
  - Density: 30.0/km^{2} (77.6/sq mi)
- Time zone: UTC+01:00 (CET)
  - Summer (DST): UTC+02:00 (CEST)
- Postal codes: 79677
- Dialling codes: 07673
- Vehicle registration: LÖ
- Website: www.gvvschoenau.de

Fröhnd (German pronunciation: [fʁøːnt]) is a municipality in the district of Lörrach in Baden-Württemberg in Germany. It is situated in the southern Black Forest and is an amalgamation of villages around the Wiese.
