= Böllen =

- Municipality
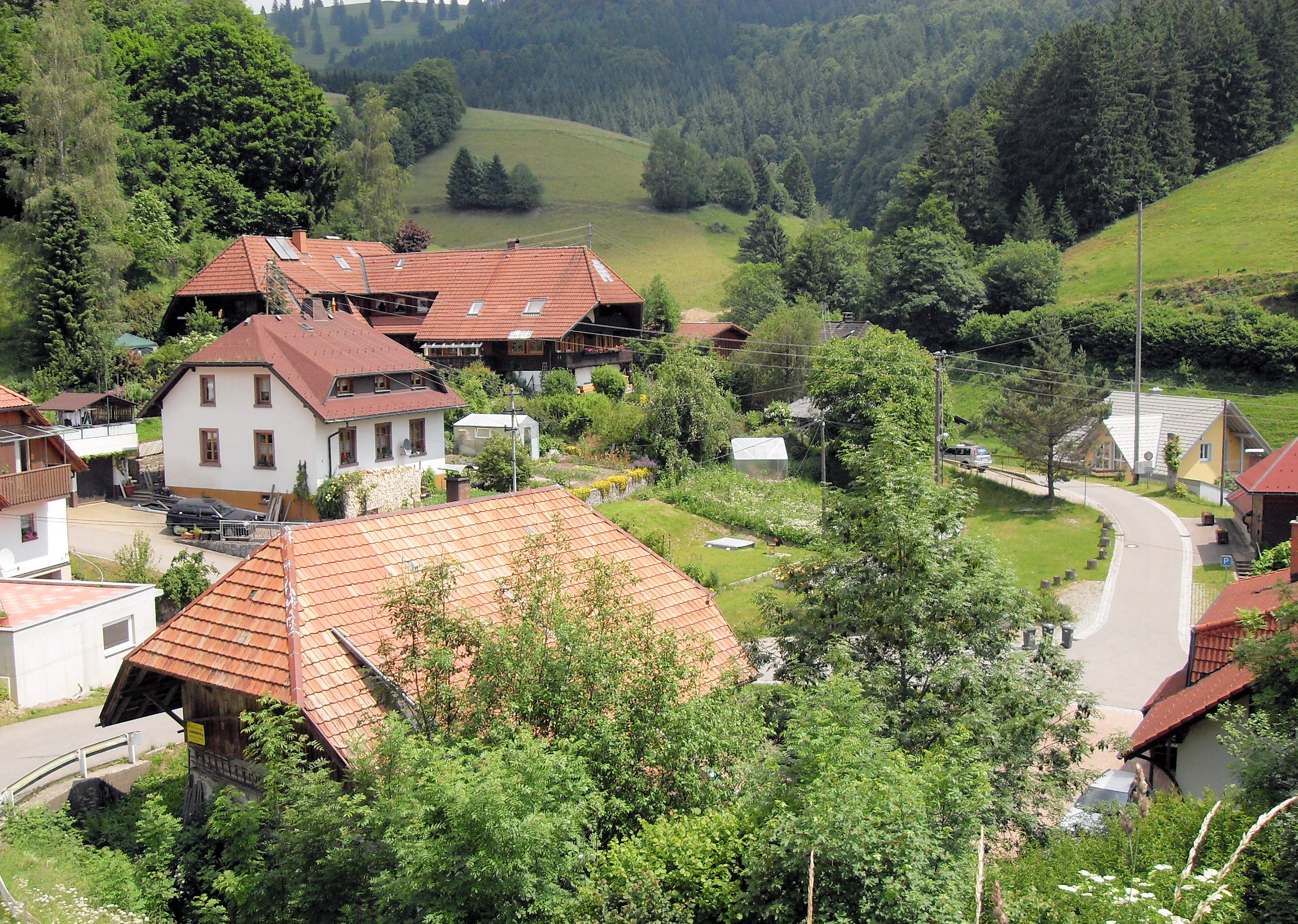

- Coat of arms

- Location of Böllen within Lörrach district
- Interactive map of Böllen
- Location within Germany Location within Baden-Württemberg
- Coordinates: 47°48′7″N 7°50′27″E
- Country: Germany
- State: Baden-Württemberg
- Admin. region: Freiburg
- District: Lörrach
- Municipal assoc.: Schönau im Schwarzwald

Government
  - Mayor (2016–24): Bruno Kiefer

Area
  - Total: 5.67 km^{2} (2.19 sq mi)
- Elevation: 750 m (2,460 ft)

Population (2025-12-31)
  - Total: 95
  - Density: 17/km^{2} (43/sq mi)
- Time zone: UTC+01:00 (CET)
  - Summer (DST): UTC+02:00 (CEST)
- Postal codes: 79677
- Dialling codes: 07673
- Vehicle registration: LÖ
- Website: www.boellen.de

Böllen (German pronunciation: [ˈbœlən]) is a municipality in the southwestern German Federal State of Baden-Württemberg, part of the Lörrach district. With a population of 104 inhabitants, it is by the least populated municipality in the federal state. The coat of arms of Böllen were granted in 1902. The blazon is Azure issuant from a Base Vert a Mountain Or, reflecting the town's proximity to Mount Belchen, the second highest mountain in the Black Forest.
