= Häg-Ehrsberg =

- Municipality
- Coat of arms

- Location of Häg-Ehrsberg within Lörrach district
- Interactive map of Häg-Ehrsberg
- Location within Germany Location within Baden-Württemberg
- Coordinates: 47°44′02″N 07°55′00″E
- Country: Germany
- State: Baden-Württemberg
- Admin. region: Freiburg
- District: Lörrach

Government
  - Mayor (2023–31): Dirk Philipp

Area
  - Total: 25.03 km^{2} (9.66 sq mi)
- Elevation: 681 m (2,234 ft)

Population (2025-12-31)
  - Total: 788
  - Density: 31.5/km^{2} (81.5/sq mi)
- Time zone: UTC+01:00 (CET)
  - Summer (DST): UTC+02:00 (CEST)
- Postal codes: 79685
- Dialling codes: 07625
- Vehicle registration: LÖ
- Website: www.haeg-ehrsberg.de

Häg-Ehrsberg is a municipality in the district of Lörrach in Baden-Württemberg in Germany.

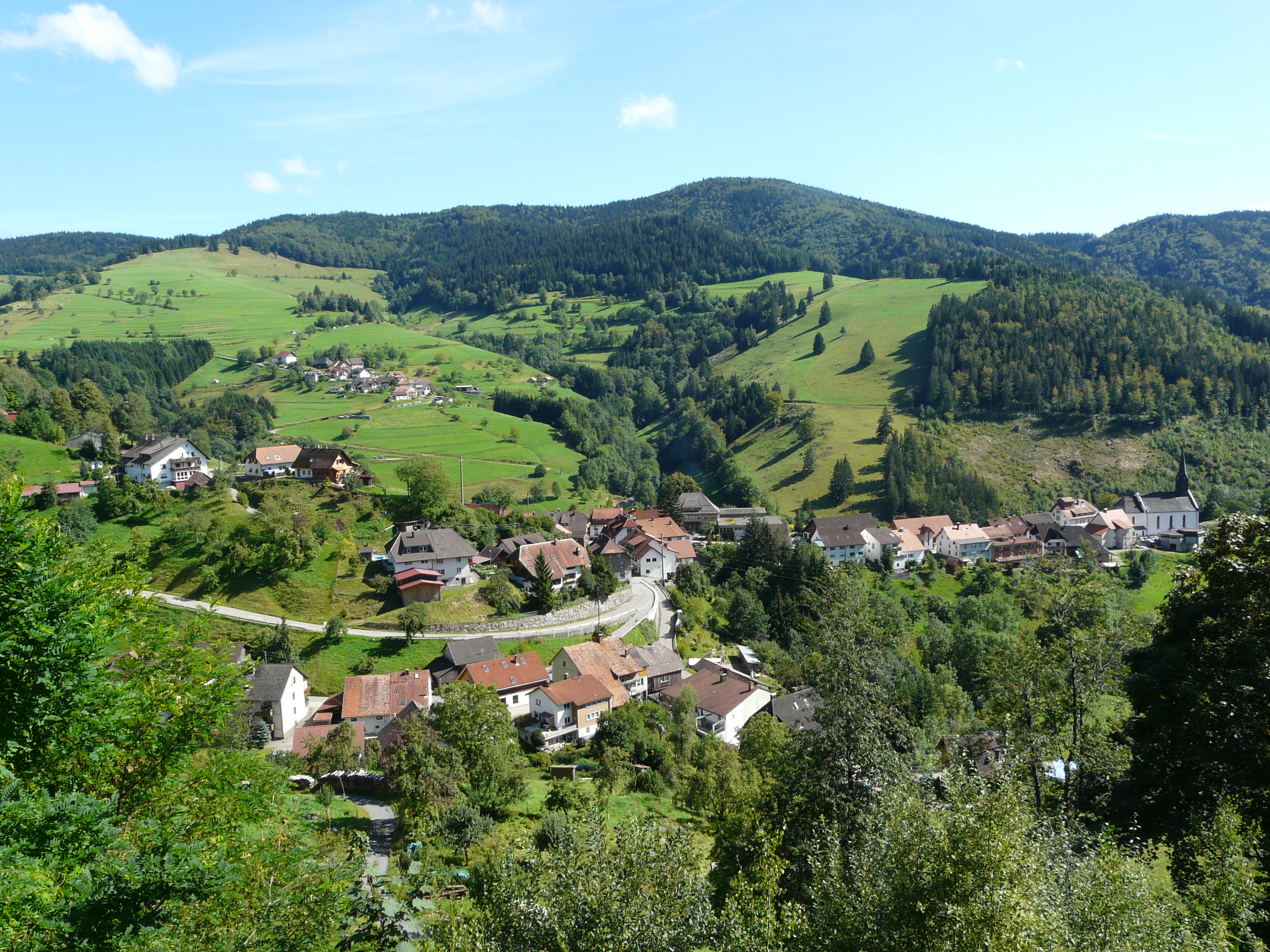
Häg

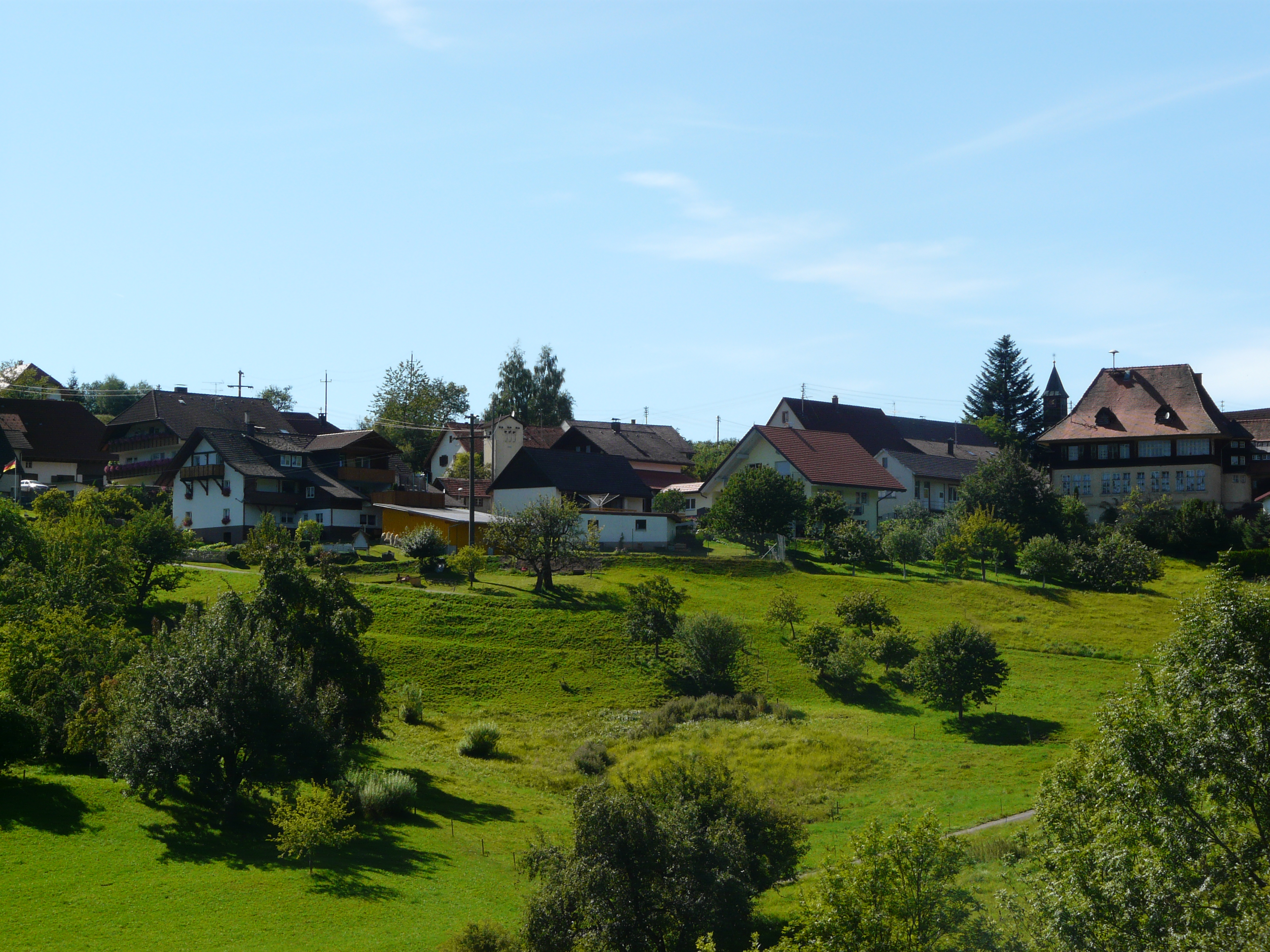
Ehrsberg

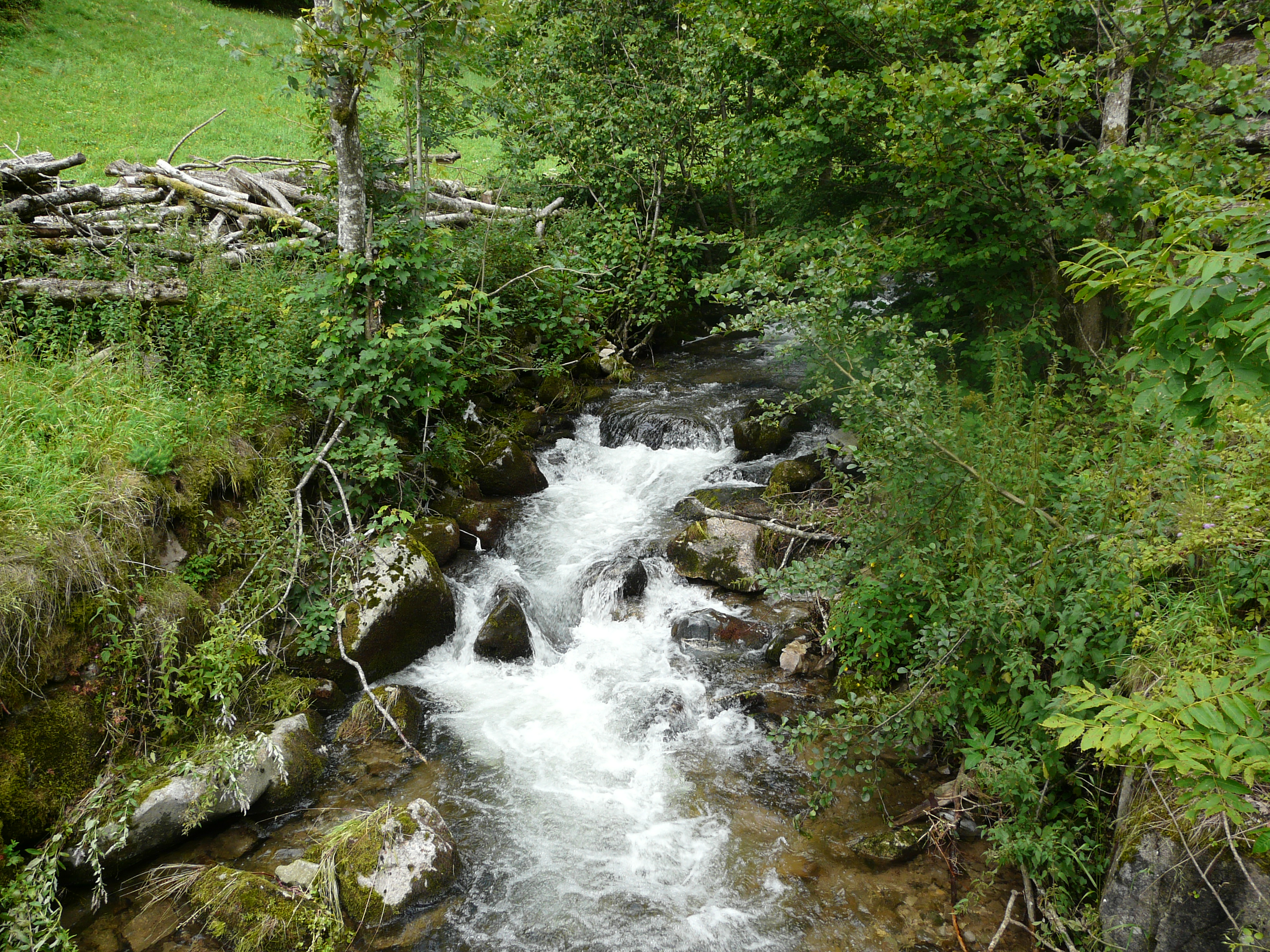
The Angenbach, a small brook that flows through the area of Häg-Ehrsberg

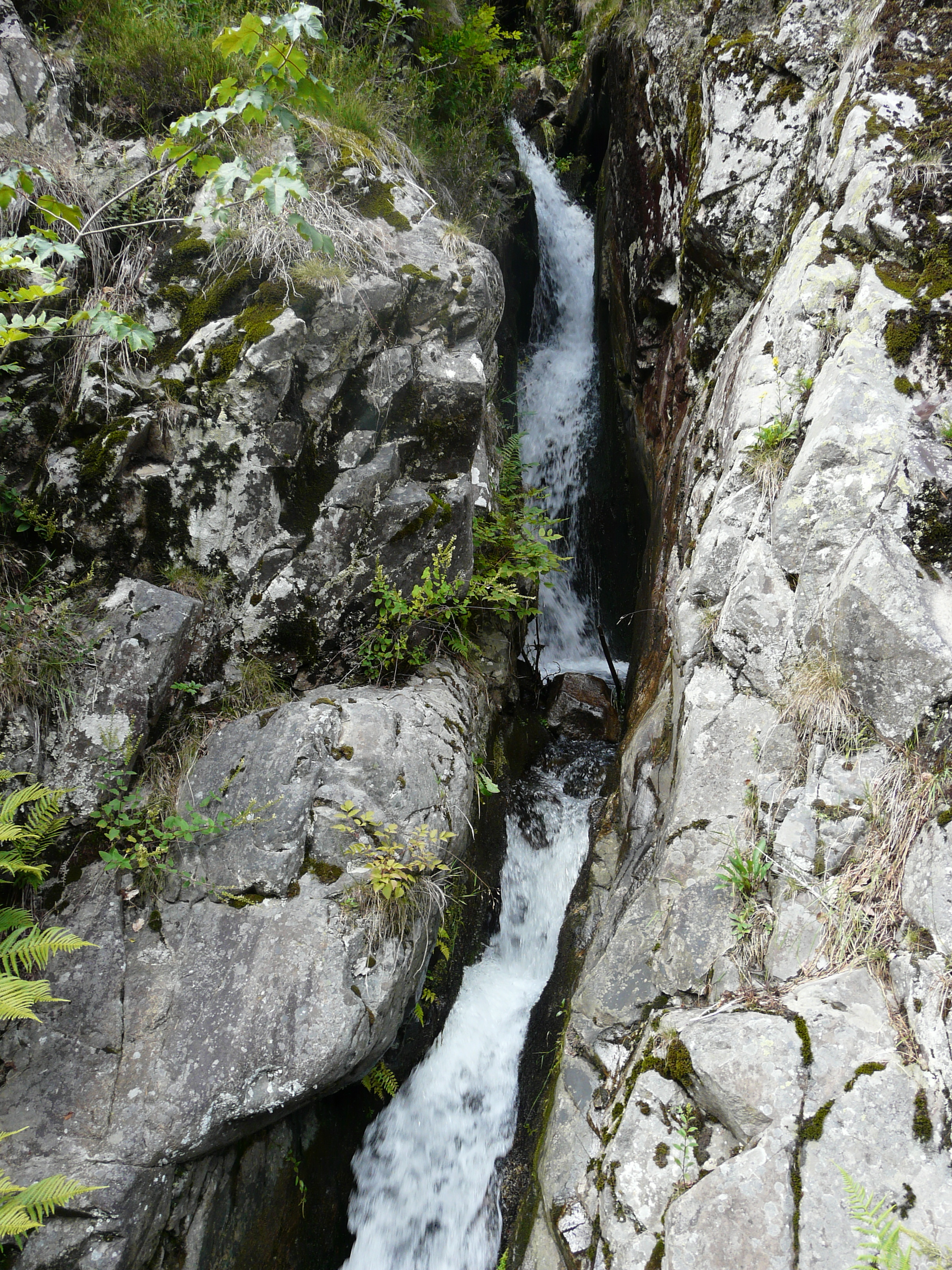
The Häg Waterfalls
