= Lörrach (district) =

Coordinates: 47.65°N 7.7°E

- District
- Flag Coat of arms
- Country: Germany
- State: Baden-Württemberg
- Adm. region: Freiburg
- Capital: Lörrach

Government
  - District admin.: Marion Dammann

Area
  - Total: 806.81 km^{2} (311.51 sq mi)

Population (31 December 2025)
  - Total: 238,142
  - Density: 295.16/km^{2} (764.47/sq mi)
- Time zone: UTC+01:00 (CET)
  - Summer (DST): UTC+02:00 (CEST)
- Vehicle registration: LÖ
- Website: www.landkreis-loerrach.de

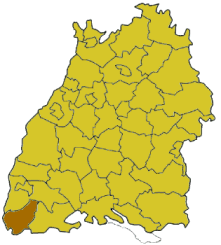
Location of Lörrach county

Lörrach is a Landkreis (district) in the southwest of Baden-Württemberg, Germany. Neighboring districts are Breisgau-Hochschwarzwald and Waldshut. To the west it borders the French département Haut-Rhin; to the south the Swiss cantons Basel-Stadt, Basel-Landschaft and Aargau.

== History ==
In 1973 part of the district Müllheim and small parts of the district Säckingen were added to the district, which enlarged the district by about 25% to the current size.

== Geography ==
The north-east of the district is part of the Hochschwarzwald, the highest part of the Black Forest. In the west is the Markgräfler Hügelland, in the south the Dinkelberg, both lower hilly areas. The Rhine river, which forms most of the district's southern and western border, is in a narrow valley until it spreads north of Basel in the much wider Oberrheinebene. The district is included in the trinational Basel metropolitan area.

== Coat of arms ==
The coat of arms of the Lörrach district can be blazoned as Per fess Argent a Demi Lion facing sinister Gules and in base per pale Or a Bend Gules and Azure a Bend Sinister wavy Argent. The lion in the top part of the coat of arms represents the Lords of Rötteln, who had their primary castle in Loerrach, Wiesental. The bottom-left shows the coat of Baden, as much of the district belonged to the Counts of Baden historically. The wavy line in the bottom-right represents the small river Wiese, which flows through the district.

== Towns and municipalities ==
Clickable map of towns and municipalities in the district

Towns
Municipalities
1. Kandern
2. Lörrach
3. Rheinfelden
4. Schopfheim
5. Todtnau
6. Weil am Rhein
7. Zell im Wiesental
1. Bad Bellingen
2. Efringen-Kirchen
3. Grenzach-Wyhlen
4. Häg-Ehrsberg
5. Hasel
6. Hausen im Wiesental
7. Inzlingen
8. Kleines Wiesental
9. Malsburg-Marzell
10. Maulburg
11. Schliengen
12. Schwörstadt
13. Steinen

Gemeindeverwaltungsverbände
1. Schönau im Schwarzwald; 1. Aitern; 2. Böllen; 3. Fröhnd; 4. Schönau im Schwarzwald^{1,2}; 5. Schönenberg; 6. Tunau; 7. Utzenfeld; 8. Wembach; 9. Wieden	2. Vorderes Kandertal; 1. Binzen^{1}; 2. Eimeldingen; 3. Fischingen; 4. Rümmingen; 5. Schallbach; 6. Wittlingen
^{1}seat of the Gemeindeverwaltungsverband; ^{2}town
