= Inzlingen =

- Municipality
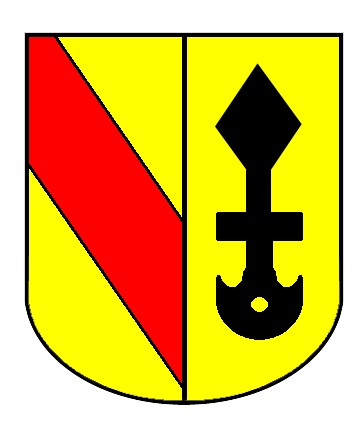
- Coat of arms

- Location of Inzlingen within Lörrach district
- Interactive map of Inzlingen
- Location within Germany Location within Baden-Württemberg
- Coordinates: 47°35′17″N 7°41′37″E
- Country: Germany
- State: Baden-Württemberg
- Admin. region: Freiburg
- District: Lörrach
- Subdivisions: 2

Government
  - Mayor (2017–25): Marco Muchenberger

Area
  - Total: 9.48 km^{2} (3.66 sq mi)
- Elevation: 400 m (1,300 ft)

Population (2025-12-31)
  - Total: 2,607
  - Density: 275/km^{2} (712/sq mi)
- Time zone: UTC+01:00 (CET)
  - Summer (DST): UTC+02:00 (CEST)
- Postal codes: 79594
- Dialling codes: 07621
- Vehicle registration: LÖ
- Website: www.inzlingen.de

Inzlingen (German pronunciation: [ˈɪntslɪŋən]; Alemannic German: Inzlige) is a municipality in the district of Lörrach in Baden-Württemberg in Germany.

From the Fondation Beyeler, a famous art collection in Riehen in the canton Basel Stadt, Switzerland, the street Inzlingerstrasse goes uphill to Inzlingen. By crossing the border the street is called Riehenstrasse and it ends at the moated castle.

== History ==
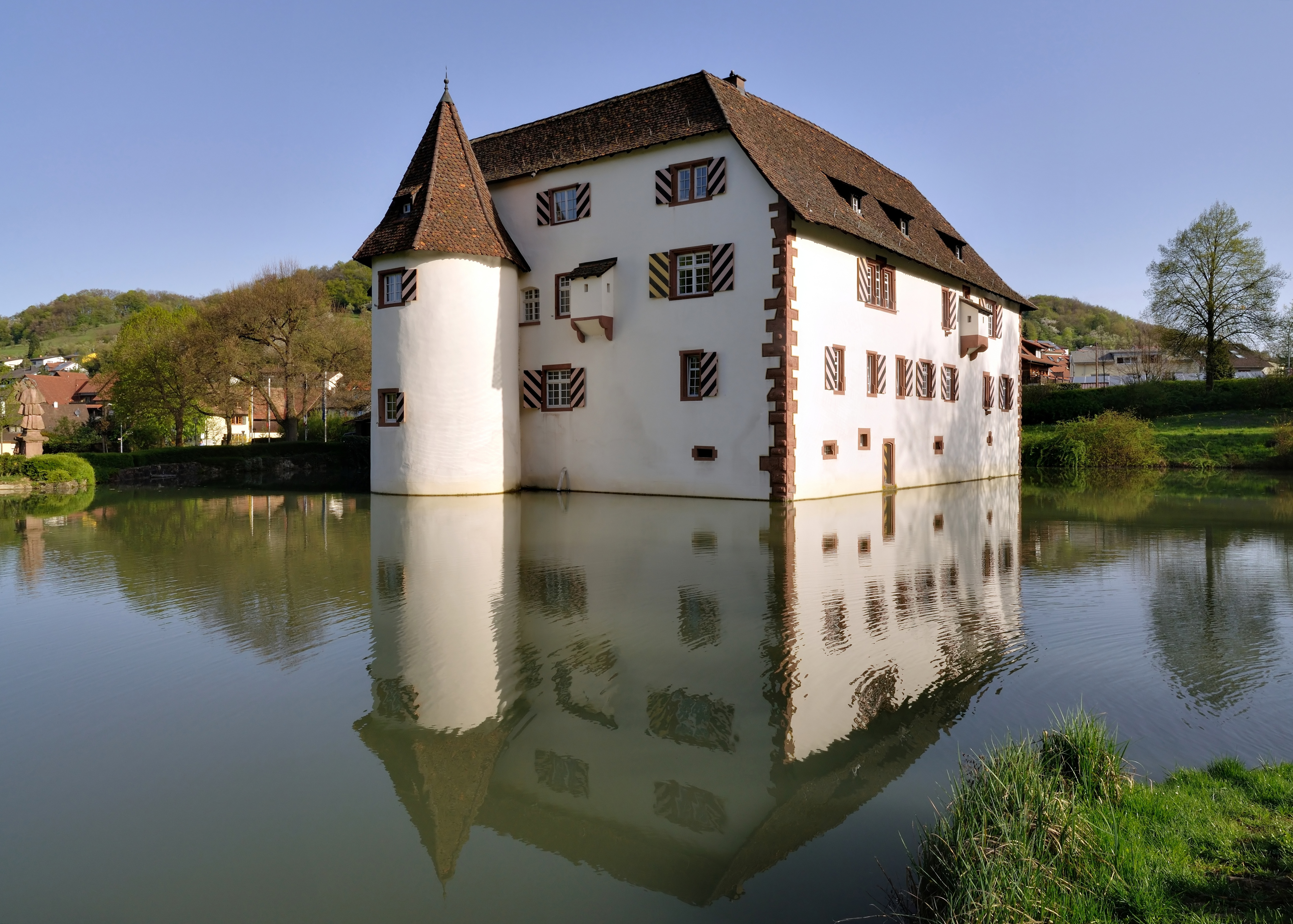
Wasserschloss Inzlingen

The first historical facts date back to 1228. In the region Inzlingen is famous for Inzlingen Castle - its moated castle, which is known since 1511. It includes the town hall of the village and a luxury restaurant.

== Politics ==
=== Mayor ===
- Erich Hildebrand (1984–2009)
- Marco Muchenberger (since 2009)

== Neighbourhood ==
Inzlingen is bounded by different municipalities in Germany and Switzerland. In addition it is located at the foothills of the Black Forest.

Lörrach		Steinen
Riehen (CH)
Basel (CH)	Grenzach-Wyhlen	Rheinfelden
