= Wembach =

- Municipality
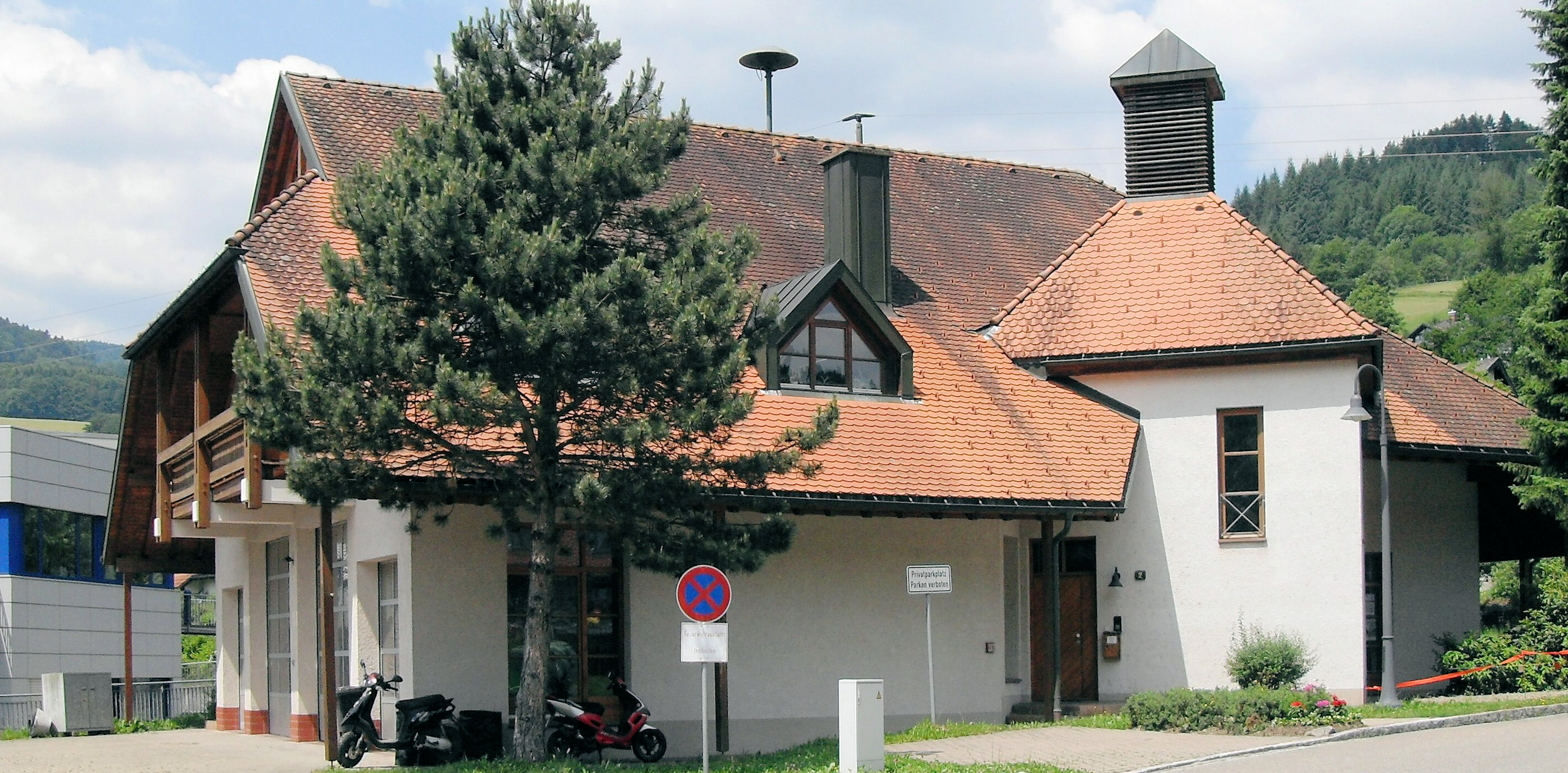
- Wembach town hall

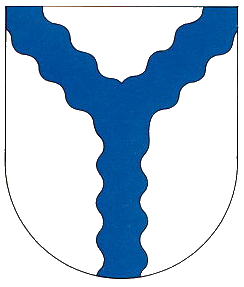
- Coat of arms

- Location of Wembach within Lörrach district
- Interactive map of Wembach
- Location within Germany Location within Baden-Württemberg
- Coordinates: 47°46′23″N 07°53′05″E
- Country: Germany
- State: Baden-Württemberg
- Admin. region: Freiburg
- District: Lörrach
- Municipal assoc.: Schönau im Schwarzwald

Government
  - Mayor (2018–26): Christian Rüscher

Area
  - Total: 1.8 km^{2} (0.69 sq mi)
- Elevation: 528 m (1,732 ft)

Population (2025-12-31)
  - Total: 297
  - Density: 160/km^{2} (430/sq mi)
- Time zone: UTC+01:00 (CET)
  - Summer (DST): UTC+02:00 (CEST)
- Postal codes: 79677
- Dialling codes: 07673
- Vehicle registration: LÖ
- Website: www.wembach.de

Wembach (German pronunciation: [ˈvɛmbax]) is a village and municipality in the district of Lörrach in Baden-Württemberg in Germany.
