= Aitern =

- Municipality
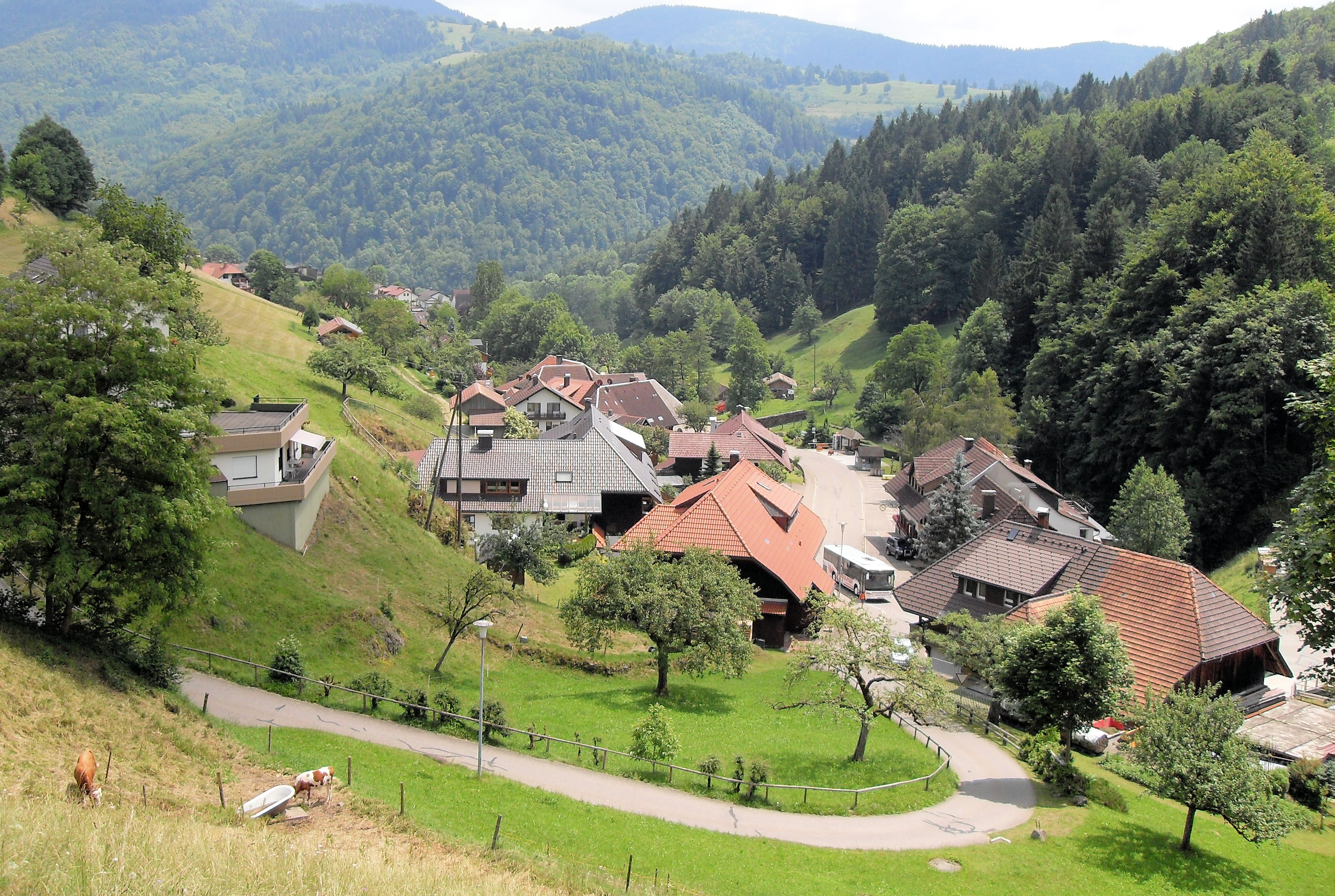
- Aitern

- Coat of arms

- Location of Aitern within Lörrach district
- Interactive map of Aitern
- Location within Germany Location within Baden-Württemberg
- Coordinates: 47°48′5″N 7°54′2″E
- Country: Germany
- State: Baden-Württemberg
- Admin. region: Freiburg
- District: Lörrach
- Municipal assoc.: Schönau im Schwarzwald

Area
  - Total: 9.21 km^{2} (3.56 sq mi)
- Elevation: 630 m (2,070 ft)

Population (2025-12-31)
  - Total: 468
  - Density: 50.8/km^{2} (132/sq mi)
- Time zone: UTC+01:00 (CET)
  - Summer (DST): UTC+02:00 (CEST)
- Postal codes: 79677
- Dialling codes: 07673
- Vehicle registration: LÖ
- Website: www.aitern.de

Aitern (German pronunciation: [ˈaɪtɐn]; Alemannic German: Aitere) is a small municipality in the south-western German Federal State of Baden-Württemberg, part of the district Lörrach. Its coat of arms was granted in 1907. The blazon is Argent a Bend wavy Azure between two Rock Hammers Azure handled Sable. The wavy bend in the arms is allusive to the towns name, as it is derived from the Celtic word aitara which means flowing.

== Demographics ==
The number of inhabitants over time has developed as follows:

Year	Inhabitants
1961	389
1968	425
1974	519
1980	504
1985	516
1990	594

Year	Inhabitants
1995	561
2000	586
2005	549
2010	550
2015	553
2020	524
