= Tunau =

- Municipality
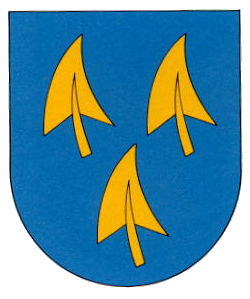
- Coat of arms

- Location of Tunau within Lörrach district
- Interactive map of Tunau
- Location within Germany Location within Baden-Württemberg
- Coordinates: 47°47′09″N 07°55′26″E
- Country: Germany
- State: Baden-Württemberg
- Admin. region: Freiburg
- District: Lörrach
- Municipal assoc.: Schönau im Schwarzwald

Government
  - Mayor (2017–25): Dirk Pfeffer

Area
  - Total: 4.05 km^{2} (1.56 sq mi)
- Elevation: 734 m (2,408 ft)

Population (2025-12-31)
  - Total: 181
  - Density: 44.7/km^{2} (116/sq mi)
- Time zone: UTC+01:00 (CET)
  - Summer (DST): UTC+02:00 (CEST)
- Postal codes: 79677
- Dialling codes: 07673
- Vehicle registration: LÖ

Tunau (German pronunciation: [ˈtuːnaʊ]) is a municipality in the district of Lörrach in Baden-Württemberg in Germany.
