= Maulburg =

- Municipality
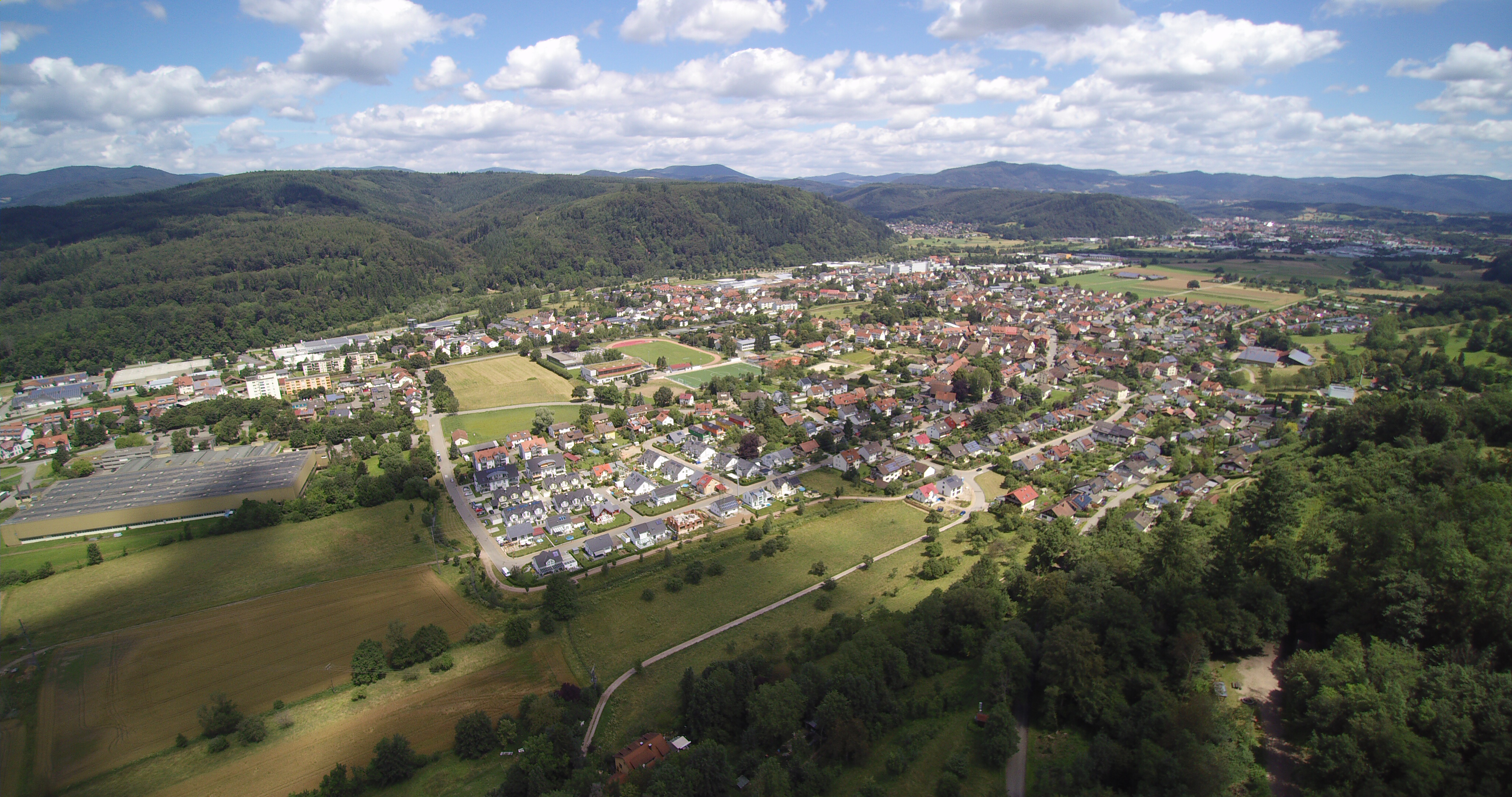
- Aerial view

- Coat of arms

- Location of Maulburg within Lörrach district
- Interactive map of Maulburg
- Location within Germany Location within Baden-Württemberg
- Coordinates: 47°38′42″N 07°46′46″E
- Country: Germany
- State: Baden-Württemberg
- Admin. region: Freiburg
- District: Lörrach

Government
  - Mayor (2024–32): Jessica Lang

Area
  - Total: 9.73 km^{2} (3.76 sq mi)
- Elevation: 353 m (1,158 ft)

Population (2025-12-31)
  - Total: 4,275
  - Density: 439/km^{2} (1,140/sq mi)
- Time zone: UTC+01:00 (CET)
  - Summer (DST): UTC+02:00 (CEST)
- Postal codes: 79689
- Dialling codes: 07622
- Vehicle registration: LÖ
- Website: www.maulburg.de

Maulburg (German pronunciation: [ˈmaʊlbʊʁk]; Alemannic German: Muulburg) is a municipality in the district of Lörrach in Baden-Württemberg in Germany.

== Demographics ==
Population development:

Year	Inhabitants
1990	3,682
2001	3,986
2011	4,143
2021	4,257

== Transport ==
The municipality has a railway station, Maulburg, on the Wiese Valley Railway.
