= Grenzach-Wyhlen =

- Municipality
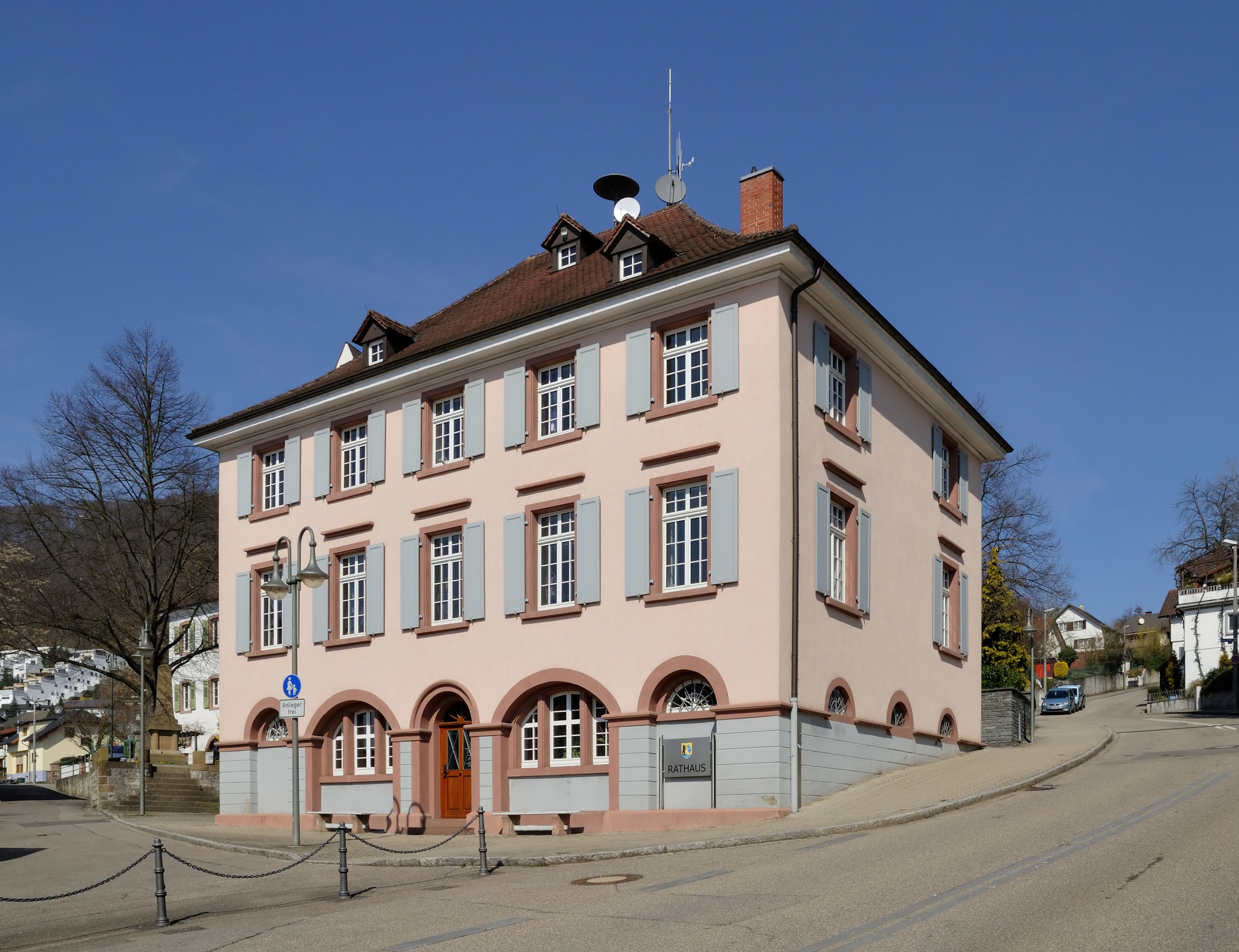
- Town hall in Grenzach

- Coat of arms

- Location of Grenzach-Wyhlen within Lörrach district
- Interactive map of Grenzach-Wyhlen
- Location within Germany Location within Baden-Württemberg
- Coordinates: 47°32′42″N 7°40′33″E
- Country: Germany
- State: Baden-Württemberg
- Admin. region: Freiburg
- District: Lörrach
- Subdivisions: 2

Government
  - Mayor (2022–30): Tobias Benz (CDU)

Area
  - Total: 17.31 km^{2} (6.68 sq mi)
- Elevation: 277 m (909 ft)

Population (2025-12-31)
  - Total: 15,262
  - Density: 881.7/km^{2} (2,284/sq mi)
- Time zone: UTC+01:00 (CET)
  - Summer (DST): UTC+02:00 (CEST)
- Postal codes: 79639
- Dialling codes: 07624
- Vehicle registration: LÖ
- Website: www.grenzach-wyhlen.de

Grenzach-Wyhlen (German pronunciation: [ˈɡʁɛntsax ˈviːlən]) is a municipality of 15,000 people in the district of Lörrach in Baden-Württemberg, Germany. It sits on the right bank of the Rhine abutting the Swiss municipalities of Riehen and Bettingen in the Kanton of Basel-Stadt, the German municipality of Inzlingen and the German town of Rheinfelden. Its town hall is 6.5 km east of that of Basel and 8 km south of that of Lörrach.

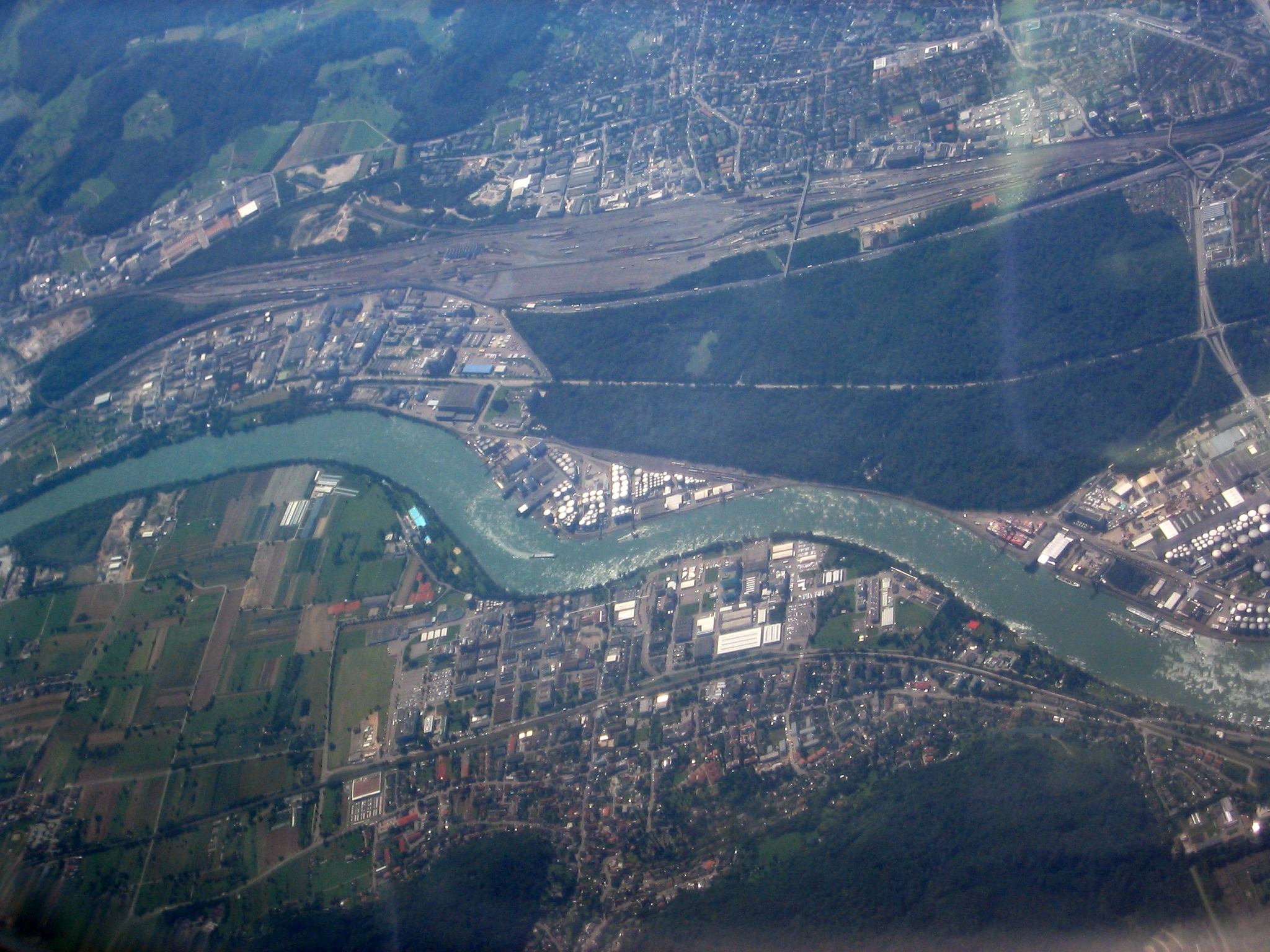
Aerial view of the Rhine, with Grenzach in the foreground

== History ==
Grenzach-Wyhlen was established on January 1, 1975 from the two independent municipalities Grenzach and Wyhlen in the course of the Baden-Württemberg reform of the local governments.

First settlements in today's municipality area are of Celtic origin, belonging to the Hallstatt culture in the early 1st millennium BC. The Celtic settlement was followed by Roman settlements and from the 3rd century on by Alemannic ones. The name "Wyhlen" originates in Alemannic "ze wilon", meaning "at the farmstead".

The Roman settlement was called Carantiacum (well of Carantius). From this name today's name Grenzach emerged. In 1982 remains of a Roman villa were excavated. Later on some ruins of an outbuilding were found and archaeologically investigated too. 1991 more walls were found, which were restored and are now visible to the public.

The first documented mentioning of the settlement was in the 13th century CE, when Grenzach and Wyhlen were under Frankish rule. In the late Middle Ages the villages were separated by a national border. Grenzach came to the Margraviate of Baden, while Wyhlen belonged to Further Austria.

In the Thirty Years' War and in later military conflicts the villages suffered severe devastation. With the founding of the Grand Duchy of Baden Wyhlen also became Badisch, so that after more than 500 years the two places were again under the same territorial rule.
