= Binzen =

- Municipality
- Coat of arms

- Location of Binzen within Lörrach district
- Interactive map of Binzen
- Location within Germany Location within Baden-Württemberg
- Coordinates: 47°37′52″N 7°37′24″E
- Country: Germany
- State: Baden-Württemberg
- Admin. region: Freiburg
- District: Lörrach
- Municipal assoc.: Vorderes Kandertal

Government
  - Mayor (2020–28): Andreas Schneucker (CDU)

Area
  - Total: 5.81 km^{2} (2.24 sq mi)
- Elevation: 284 m (932 ft)

Population (2025-12-31)
  - Total: 2,963
  - Density: 510/km^{2} (1,320/sq mi)
- Time zone: UTC+01:00 (CET)
  - Summer (DST): UTC+02:00 (CEST)
- Postal codes: 79589
- Dialling codes: 07621
- Vehicle registration: LÖ
- Website: www.binzen.de

Binzen (German pronunciation: [ˈbɪntsn̩]; Alemannic German: Binze) is a municipality in the southwestern German Federal State of Baden-Württemberg, part of the district Lörrach. The town's coat of arms was granted on 29 August 1967. The blazon of the arms is Azure a Garb Or on a Chief Gules a Rising Sun in Splendour Or. The town is the seat of the municipal administrative association Vorderes Kandertal.

== Geography ==
=== Geographical Location ===
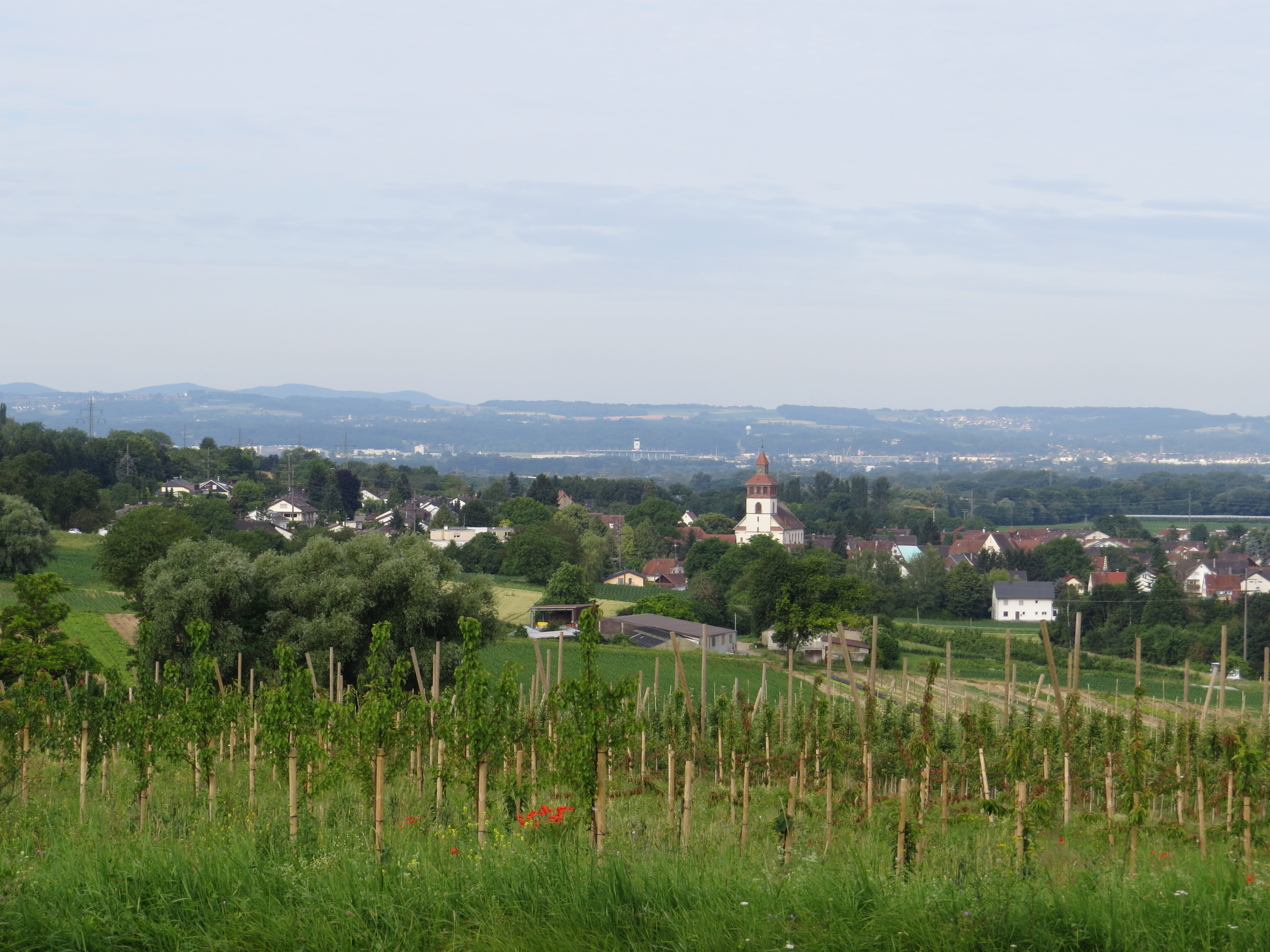
Binzen from the east

Binzen in the Three-Country Corner

Binzen is situated in the Three-Country Corner of Germany, Switzerland, and France, on the southwestern foothills of the Black Forest at the exit of the Kandertal valley in the greater Basel-Weil-Lörrach area. To the south of Binzen lies the approximately 460-meter-high Tüllinger Berg.

=== Neighboring Municipalities ===
The municipality borders to the north on an exclave of Efringen-Kirchen, as well as on Fischingen and Schallbach; to the east on Rümmingen; to the southeast on the district town of Lörrach; to the south on the city of Weil am Rhein; and to the west on Eimeldingen.

=== Municipal Structure ===
The municipality of Binzen includes the village of Binzen, the houses Autohof and Buchmühle, as well as the farm Obere Mühle. The deserted settlement of Eppalinchova is also located within the municipal area.

=== Watercourses ===
Binzen also includes a part of the Kander river.

== History ==
The first documented mention of the settlement as Binuzhaine dates back to the year 767. It is mentioned again in 807 as Pinuzheim in a document from the St. Gallen Abbey. The village was confiscated as an Alamannic lordship by the Franks and came into the possession of the Frankish royal monastery of St. Denis around 1200 years ago. Later, various ecclesiastical and secular authorities had rights in Binzen, with the Bishop of Basel being of particular importance. The seat of power was Binzen Castle. At the beginning of the 16th century, the majority of Binzen came into the possession of the Margraviate of Baden-Durlach, but it was not until 1769 that the entire village became part of Baden. The oldest known description of Binzen dates back to 1583 and was written by the then pastor Paul Cherler. In 1939 at the beginning of World War II, a part of the population of some Markgräfler villages near the border was evacuated. The return journey was organized before Christmas 1939. The return train from Oberstdorf to Müllheim crashed near Markdorf (railway accident near Markdorf), resulting in the death of 101 people – including 42 from Binzen.

== Religion ==
Binzen belonged ecclesiastically to the Diocese of Constance, although the Bishop of Basel was a significant landowner and feudal lord. Since the introduction of the Reformation in the Margraviate of Baden-Durlach in 1556, however, Binzen has been predominantly influenced by Protestantism. For Roman Catholics, there is the church in Haltingen, which belongs to the Archdiocese of Freiburg. According to the 2011 census, 48.1% of Binzen's residents were Protestant, 20.4% were Catholic, and 31.5% belonged to another or no religious community.

== Politics ==
=== Administrative Association ===
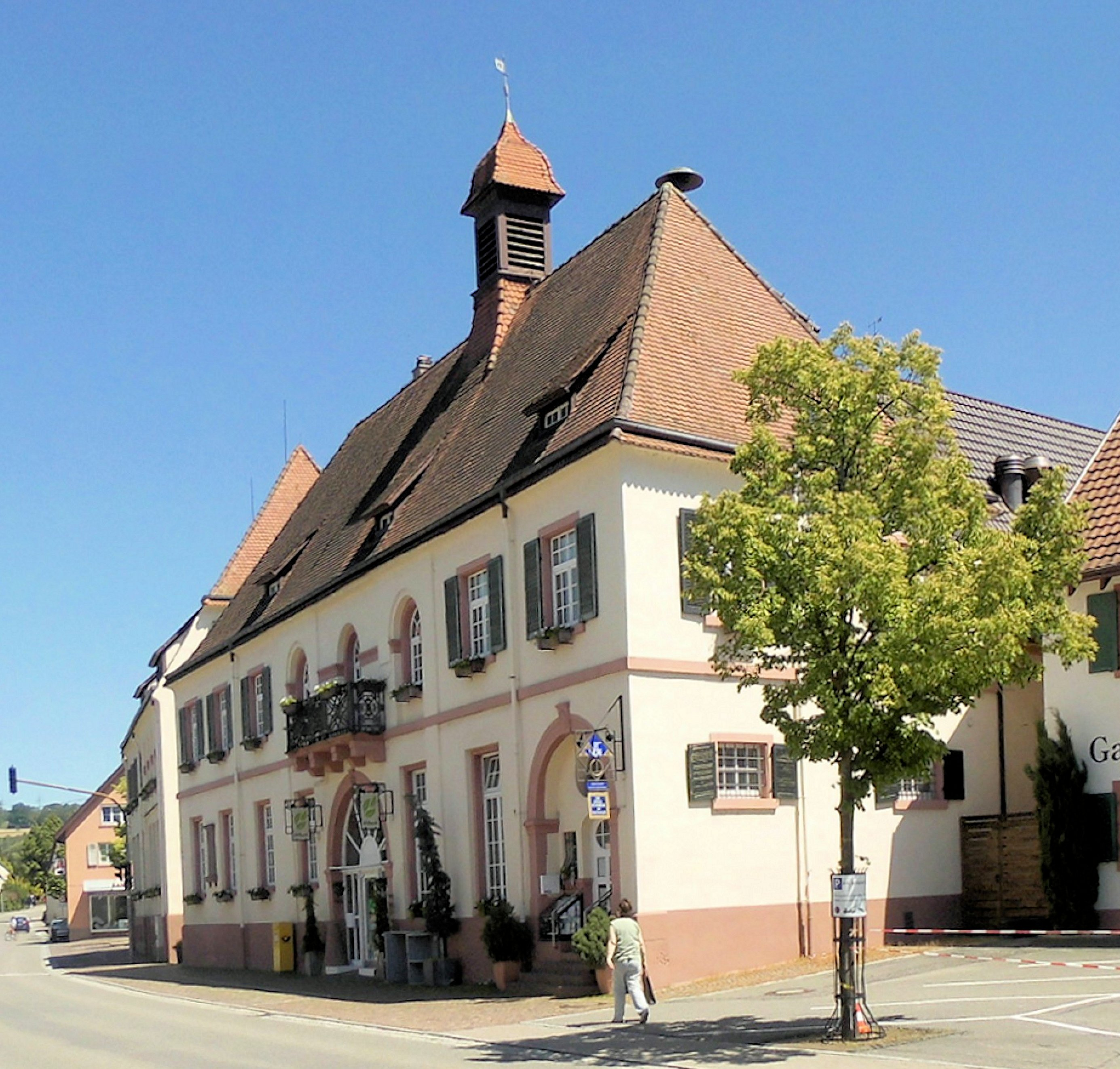
Town Hall of Binzen

Binzen is the seat of the municipal administrative association "Vorderes Kandertal," in which the municipalities of Binzen, Eimeldingen, Fischingen, Rümmingen, Schallbach, and Wittlingen have combined their administrations since 1971.

=== Municipal Council ===
Following the municipal election on 26 May 2019, the municipal council consists of the mayor as chairman and 12 members. The voter turnout was 66.5% (2014: 57.0%). The election resulted in the following outcome.

Party/List	Seats	Votes	2014 Result
Bürgerliste Binzen (Citizens' List Binzen)	6	50.15%	40.5%, 5 seats
Freie Wähler Binzen (Free Voters Binzen)	4	36.12%	34.9%, 4 seats
Unabhängige für Binzen (Independents for Binzen)	2	13.73%	24.6%, 3 seats

=== Mayor ===
Upon reaching the retirement age of 68, Ulrich May resigned from the mayor's office on 30 September 2012, after 23 years in office. On 8 July 2012, Andreas Schneucker was elected as the new mayor with 78.9% of the votes. On 12 July 2020, Andreas Schneucker was re-elected with 82.7% of the votes.

== Culture ==
=== Sights ===
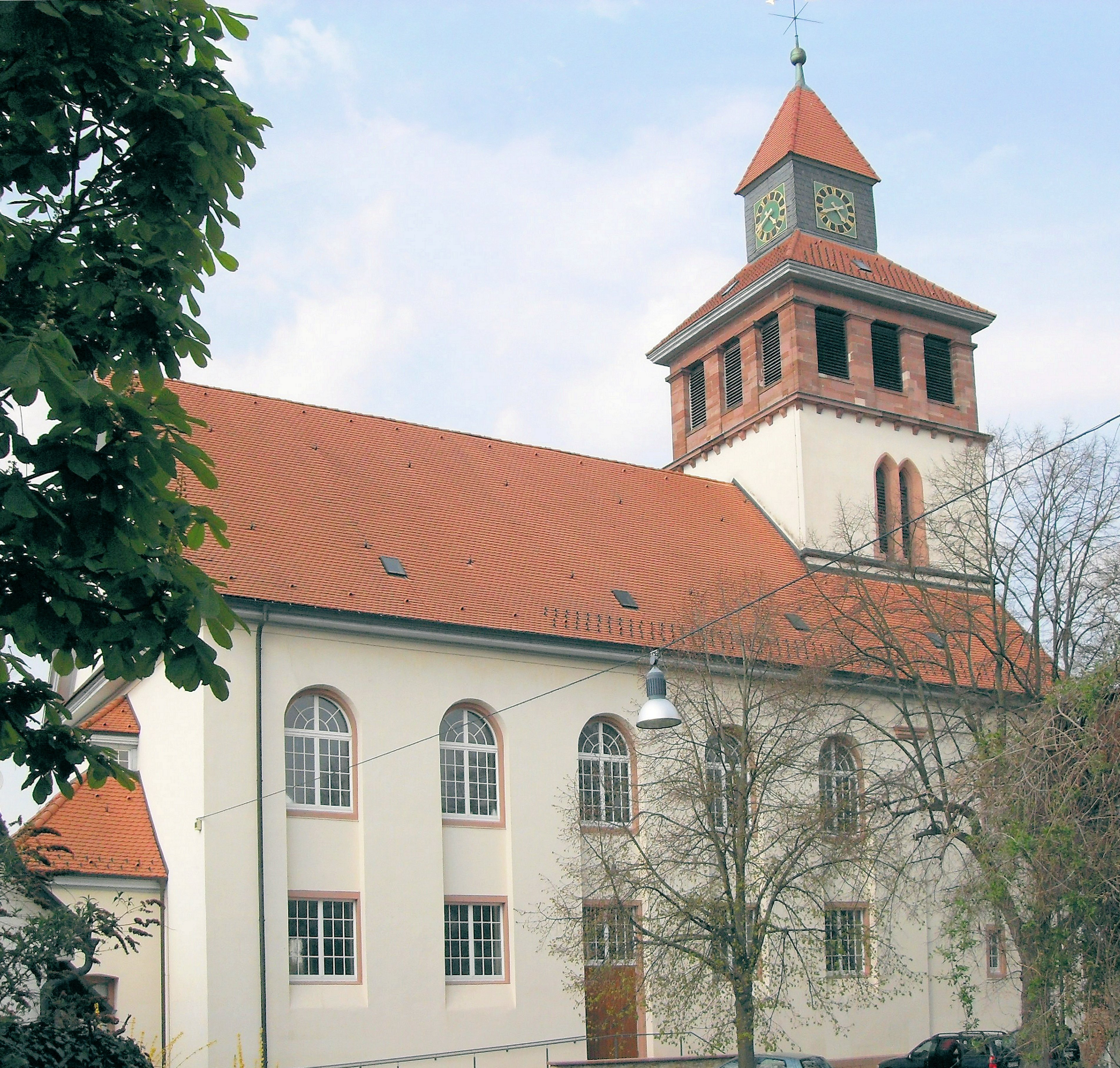
Laurentius Church Binzen

A basilica sancti Laurentii in Binzen was already mentioned in documents in the year 807. Although nothing is known about the early construction history of the current Evangelical Church Binzen, it is assumed that it was a massive stone-built house of worship.

The church became Protestant after 1556 when Margrave Karl II of Baden-Durlach converted himself and his subjects following the Peace of Augsburg.

The Laurentius Church has been modified several times. The most significant and visible change occurred from 1822 to 1824 when the old church - except for the tower - was demolished and rebuilt according to the plans of the Baden architect Friedrich Weinbrenner.

Other cultural monuments are listed in the list of cultural monuments in Binzen.

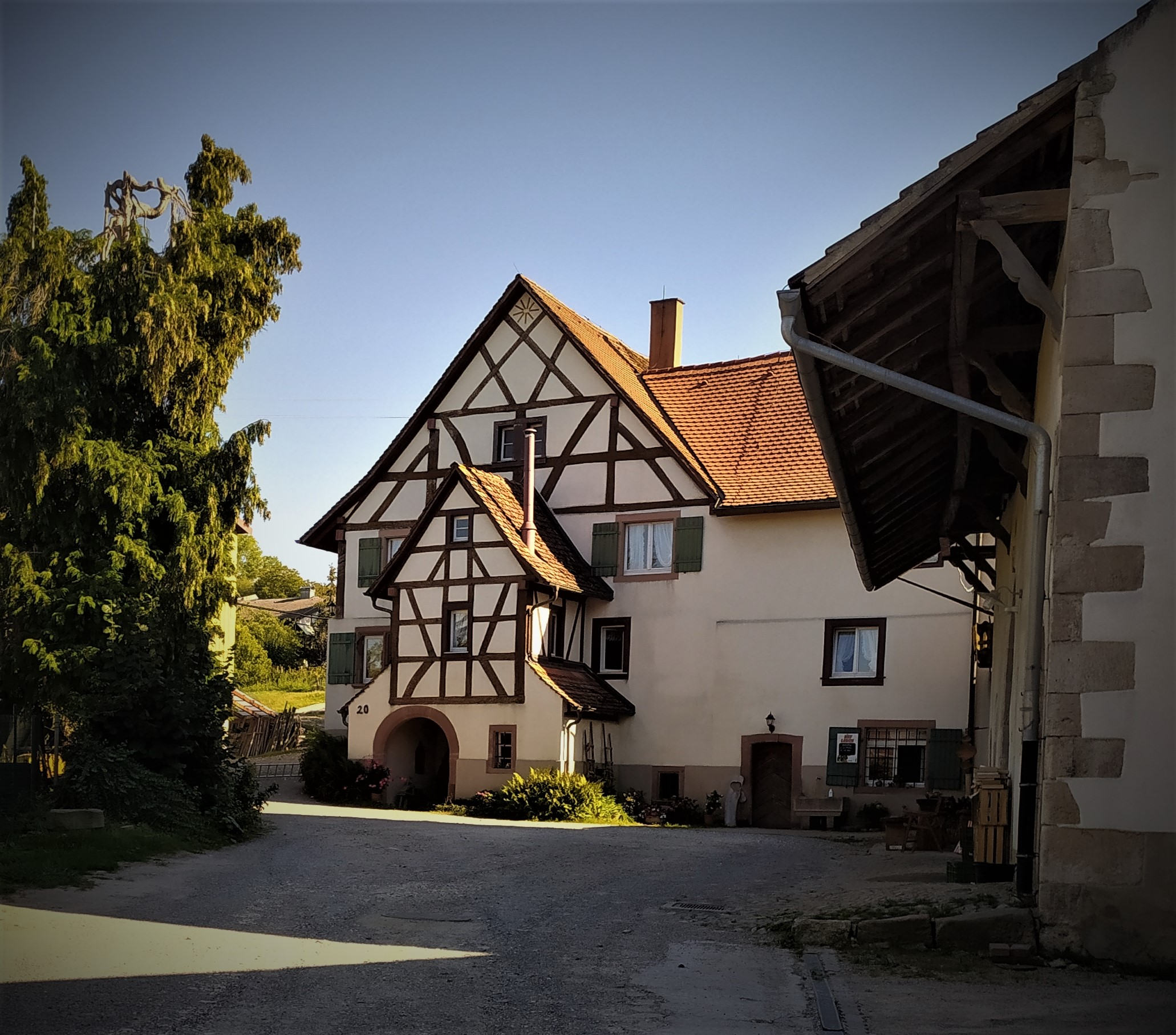
Historical Farmstead in Binzen

The sculpture Dreispitz at the industrial estate of the same name and busy traffic junction gained nationwide fame. The artwork, installed in 2001, faced a government-ordered demolition due to alleged traffic hazards.

=== Music ===
Since 2013, two concerts per year have been held as part of the concert series "Klassik bewegt Binzen" (Classics Move Binzen).

== Economy and Infrastructure ==
Binzen is a wine-growing community; 55 hectares, which is almost 10% of the municipal area, are planted with vines. The main grape varieties cultivated are Gutedel and Pinot Noir, alongside Müller-Thurgau, Nobling, and Chardonnay. Binzen is the headquarters of the Glatt Group of Companies.

=== Transportation ===
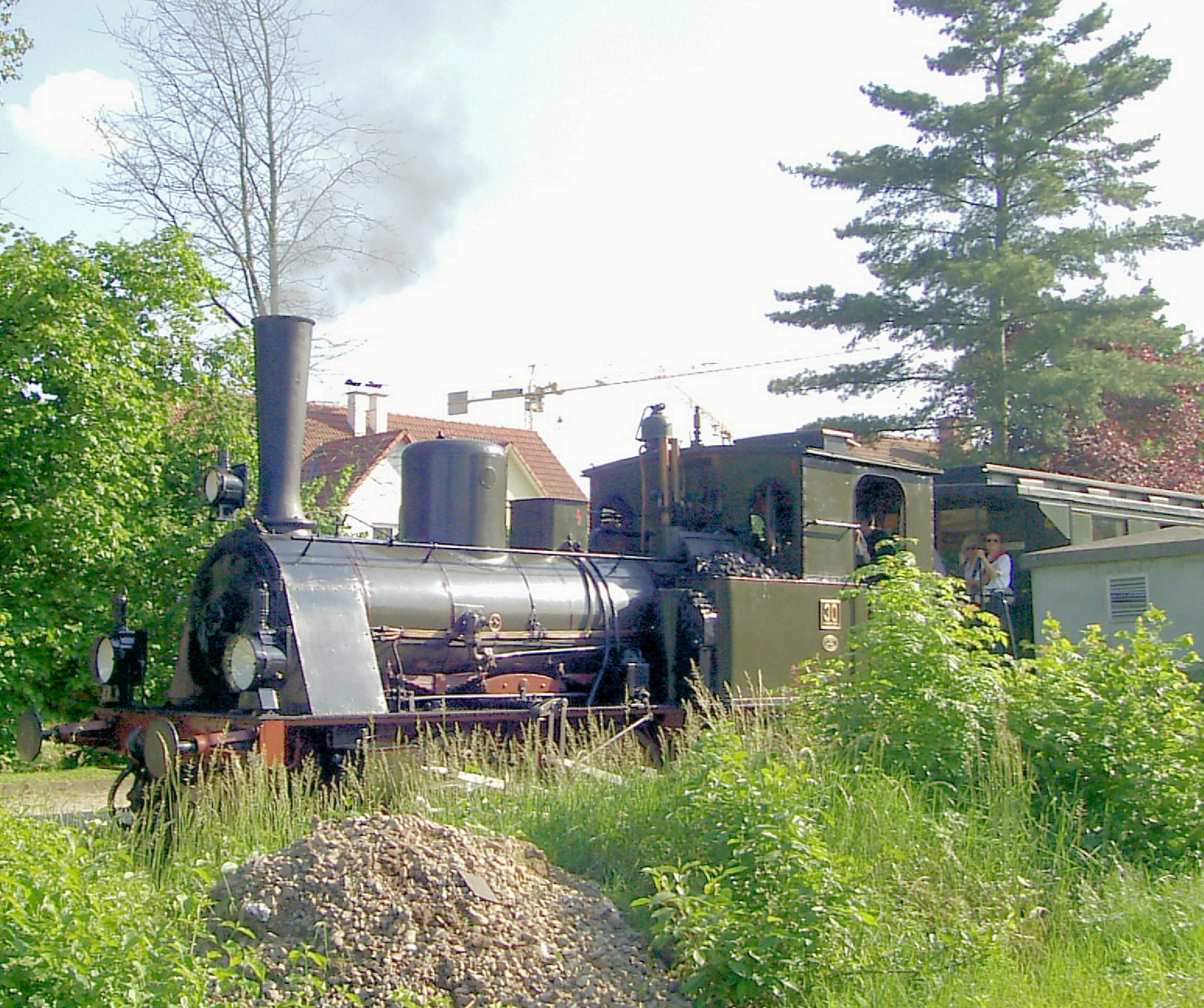
Stop of the locomotive 30 (Chanderli) of the Kandertal Railway in Binzen on the occasion of the 34th Binzen Village Festival on May 16, 2009

Binzen is located directly on the High Rhine motorway A98 (E54) (exit 4, "Kandern") from Weil am Rhein to Stockach. The Lucke Pass provides access both to the motorway exit and to the county road to Rümmingen and Lörrach. At the western municipal border, there is a motorway service area at exit 3 "Binzen".

Binzen is also located on the Kandertal Railway, a branch line that runs from Haltingen on the Rhine Valley Railway to Kandern. Traffic on the line was suspended in 1983 due to track damage caused by a storm. Today, museum operations with a steam locomotive T3 take place on summer Sundays.

=== Education ===
Binzen has been a school location for more than 500 years. Since 1558, all headmasters have been individually identifiable. With the "Mittelpunktschule Vorderes Kandertal," Binzen now has a primary and secondary school with a Werkrealschule (vocational school).
