= Kandern =

Town in Germany

- Town
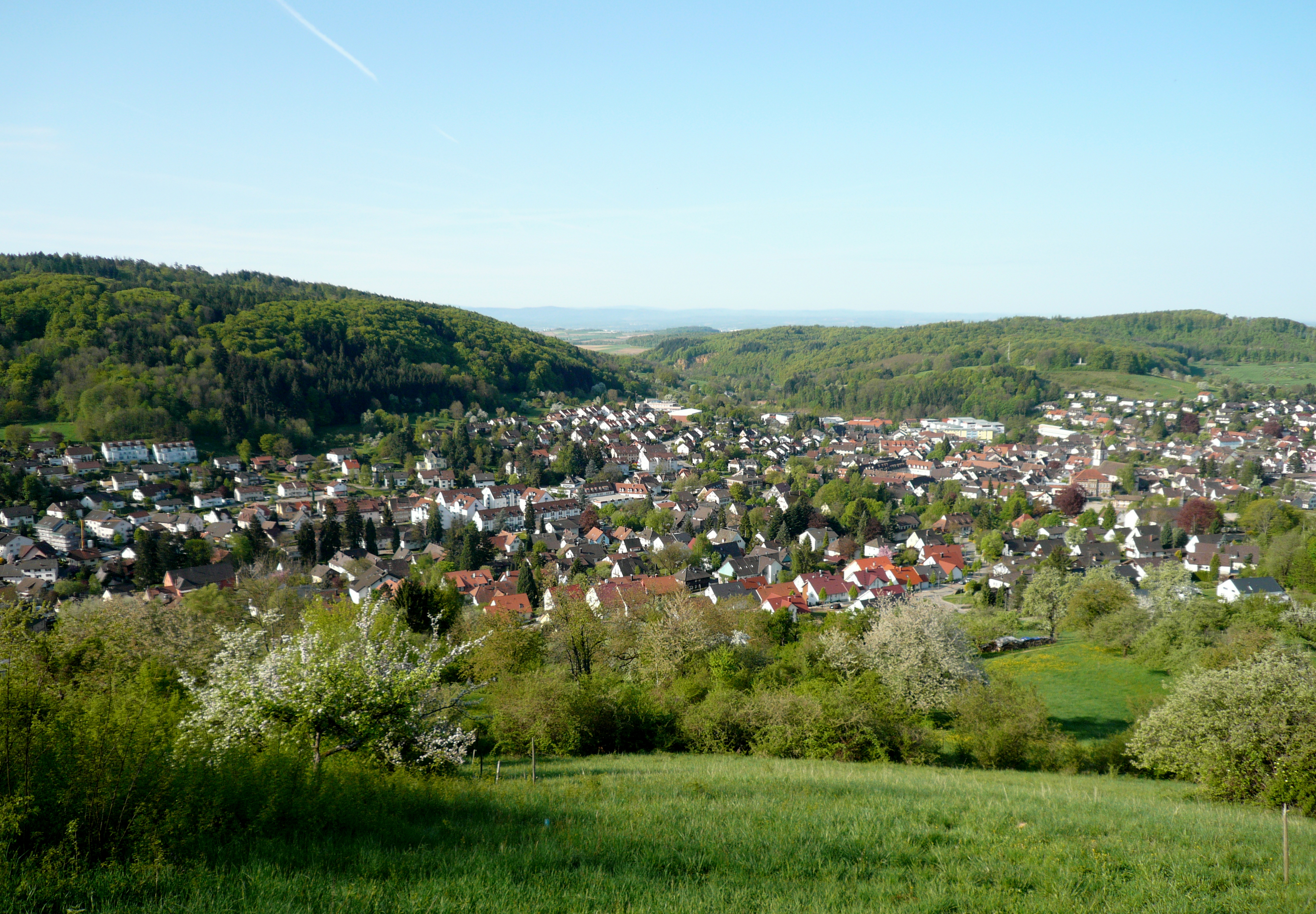

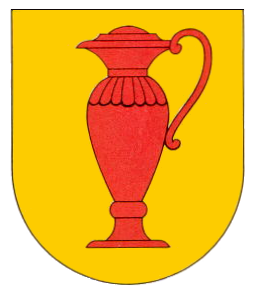
- Coat of arms

- Location of Kandern within Lörrach district
- Interactive map of Kandern
- Location within Germany Location within Baden-Württemberg
- Coordinates: 47°43′N 7°40′E
- Country: Germany
- State: Baden-Württemberg
- Admin. region: Freiburg
- District: Lörrach
- Subdivisions: 6

Government
  - Mayor (2020–28): Simone Penner

Area
  - Total: 62.26 km^{2} (24.04 sq mi)
- Elevation: 352 m (1,155 ft)

Population (2025-12-31)
  - Total: 8,657
  - Density: 139.0/km^{2} (360.1/sq mi)
- Time zone: UTC+01:00 (CET)
  - Summer (DST): UTC+02:00 (CEST)
- Postal codes: 79400
- Dialling codes: 07626
- Vehicle registration: LÖ
- Website: www.kandern.de

Kandern (German pronunciation: [ˈkandɐn]) is a city in southwestern Germany in the state of Baden-Württemberg, in the Kreis (district) of Lörrach. During the Battle of Schliengen, in which the French Revolutionary army fought the forces of Austria, the battle lines of both armies ended in Kandern. It is not far from a tripoint where the three countries Germany, France and Switzerland meet and is one of the smallest cities in Germany.

To many in North America, Kandern is best known as the birthplace of John Sutter, who owned the land that gold was discovered in 1848, which sparked the California gold rush, and the beginning of intensive settlement in California.

Today, Kandern has a large community of English-speaking residents as a result of the presence of Black Forest Academy. This is an English-language institution founded in 1956. Most of the students are from the United States, Canada, and South Korea.

The coat of arms of Kandern is a pitcher on a yellow background. The blazon is Or a covered Jug Gules.

== Geography ==
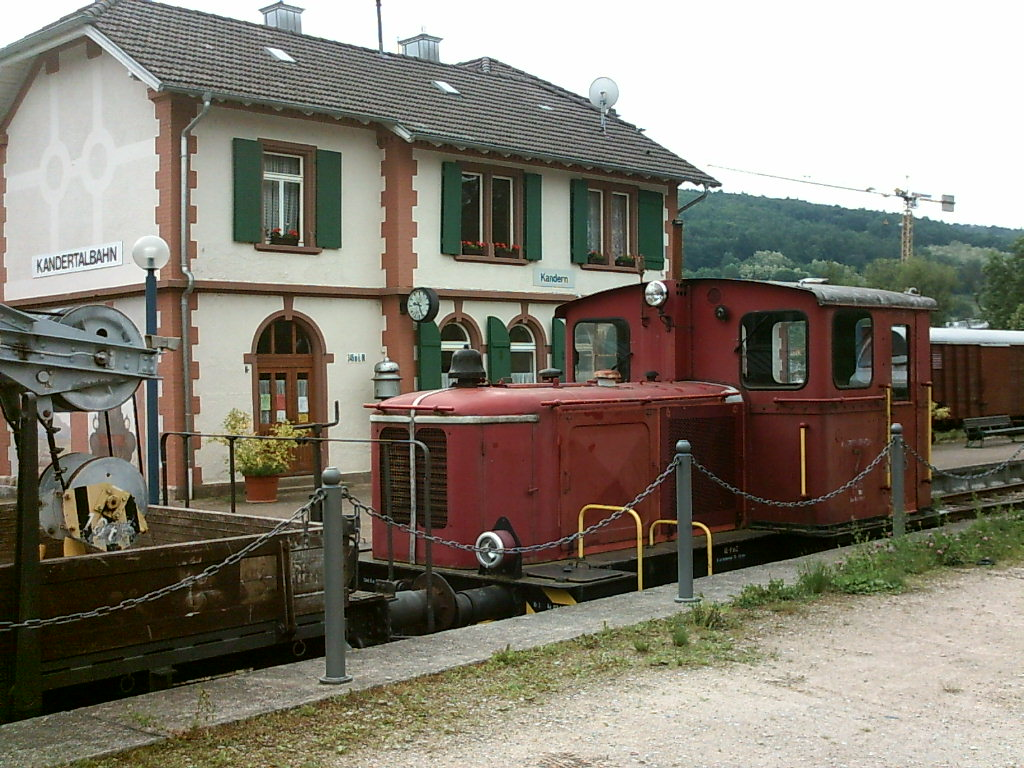
Museum at Kandern railway station

Kandern lies in southwestern Germany, at the foot of the Black Forest. North of Kandern is the Blauen or Hochblauen, one of the highest mountains in the Southern Black Forest. The Hochblauen lies at the end of the Kander Valley and is the source of the Kander. Through Kandern runs the well-known Westweg, a hiking trail through the Black Forest from Pforzheim to Basel. Nearby is the Sausenberg and its castle.

=== Neighboring Communities ===
Schliengen	Müllheim	Malsburg-Marzell
Bad Bellingen		Steinen - Endenburg
Efringen-Kirchen	Wittlingen, Rümmingen, Lörrach	Steinen

=== Subdivisions (Ortsteile) ===
The borough of Kandern consists of the town of Kandern itself, and the following villages:

- Feuerbach
- Holzen
- Riedlingen
- Sitzenkirch
- Tannenkirch
  - Uttnach
  - Ettingen
  - Gupf
- Wollbach
  - Egerten
  - Egisholz
  - Hammerstein
  - Nebenau

== Demographics ==
Population development:

Year	Inhabitants
1990	7,252
2001	7,888
2011	8,027
2021	8,348

== History ==
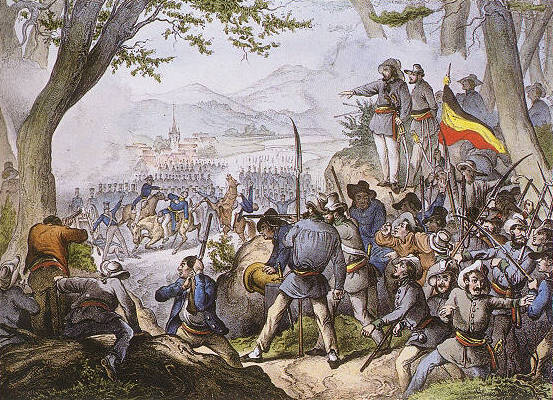
Death of General Friedrich von Gagern in battle near Kandern in 1848

Archaeological finds show that the area that is today Kandern was already inhabited in prehistoric times, by the Celts, and during the Roman period. It was probably the local clay deposits that made the site attractive to the early settlers. The name Kandern is of Germanic origin, meaning on the Kander. Kander is the name of the stream that flows through the town. Its name comes from the Celtic kandera for clear flowing.

Kandern is first mentioned in a document from the Abbey of Saint Martin in Tours, France. The document states that one Gundoson bought iron in loco municipalitum Chantra super fluvium Hantra ("in the area of the town of Kandern on the river Kander"). The next record of Kandern was in 776 A.D. when Lorsch Abbey obtained the title to some land near Kandern. The annals of the abbey from the same period mention deliveries of iron from Kandern, showing that by the 8th century it was already a recognized location. Throughout the Middle Ages, iron working provided Kandern with a certain amount of prosperity and freedom.

The town of Kandern originally grew out of three localities:

- Kandern, in the area of the present-day Lutheran church,
- Minder-Kandern, near the present-day swimming pool, and
- a settlement on the flat valley bottom near the paper mill

Several monasteries owned land in the area, and therefore exercised an influence on Kandern's early history. The most important of these was the Abbey of St. Gallen in modern Switzerland. St. Gallen was a powerful Imperial abbey, and acquired considerable territory around Kandern in the early Middle Ages. As a result of defeat in the Investiture Controversy, St. Gallen had to transfer its interests in the area to other monasteries, including St. Alban's in Basel.

Kandern was the main town of the domains of Sausenburg, which became part of the possessions of the Margrave of Baden in 1503.

In 1810, Kandern was granted the right to become a city, the Stadtrecht, which included among other rights the right to be called a city, and to hold a weekly market. Kandern lost the Stadtrecht due to municipal restructuring during the Third Reich.

In 1848, during the Badische Revolution, a battle between revolutionaries under Friedrich Hecker and Hessian troops under Friedrich von Gagern occurred on the Scheidegg near Kandern. Gagern was killed in the encounter, but the revolutionaries were defeated and scattered.

Until 1972 Kandern was part of Landkreis (rural district) Müllheim. On the dissolution of Landkreis Müllheim, Kandern became part of Landkreis Lörrach.

In 1974, the surrounding villages of Feuerbach, Holzen, Riedlingen, Sitzenkirch, Tannenkirch, and Wollbach joined the town of Kandern, which then had the necessary population to reclaim the Stadtrecht. Kandern and the neighboring villages are now collectively referred to as the City of Kandern.

=== Religion ===
As in all of the Margraviate of Baden, Kandern took part in the Reformation in 1556, and has remained predominately Protestant since.

=== Villages ===
==== Feuerbach ====
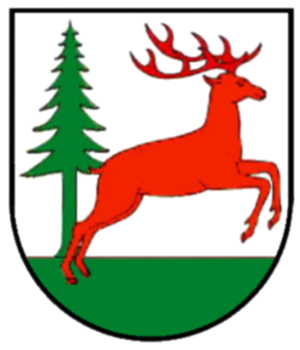

The first documented mention of Feuerbach was in the Liber decimationis of the Bishopric of Konstanz. The village became part of the possessions of the Order of St. John in 1297 and eventually came to be owned by the Margrave of Hachberg in 1470. In 1503 Feuerbach, like the rest of the Markgräflerland, became part of Baden. Feuerbach is a recognized wine-producing municipality with around 12 hectares of vineyards. The modern church was built in 1846 on medieval foundations. Feuerbach's community building houses the village offices, a youth center, the fire department and a community hall for the use of local clubs and individuals.

The shield of Feurbach does not follow any of the themes used by the other Kandern municipalities. It is not a canting coat of arms, nor does it explicitly relate to the industrial tendencies of the citizens. It was in use long before the administrative merger with Kandern and had been officially registered in 1961.

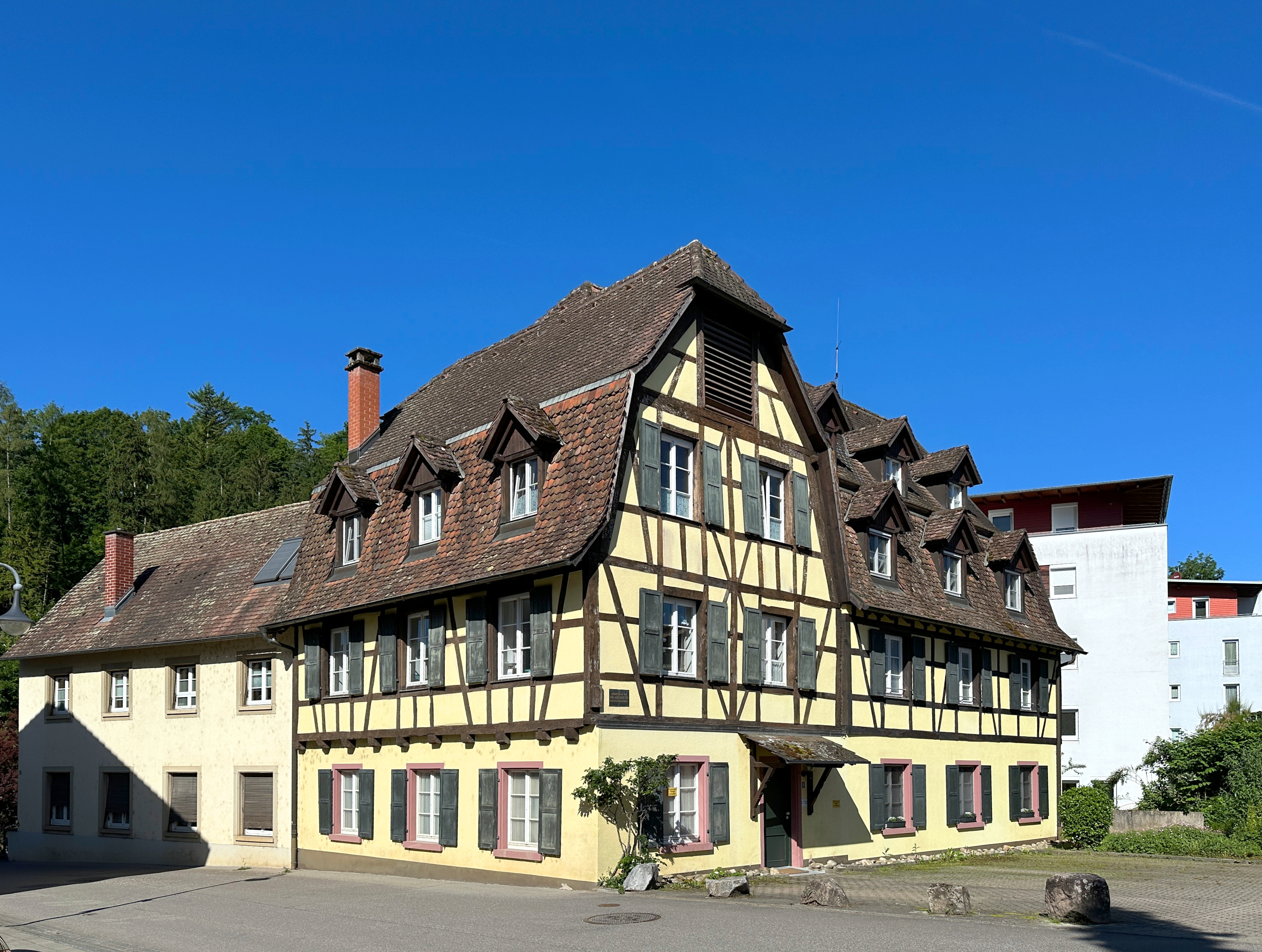
The birthplace of John Sutter in Kandern

==== Holzen ====
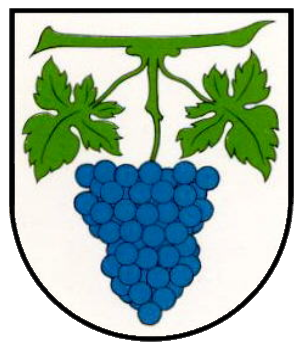

The first documented reference to Holzen was in the year 1249. In recent times, Holzen has become well known for its large stork population. A stork refuge was built in Holzen in 1979 in hopes of re-establishing the large birds in the area, where they used to be common in medieval and early modern times. The storks have spread over a wide area, and are particularly noticeable in their nests on church steeples throughout the Markgräflerland. In addition to the village offices, the Holzen Rathaus (town hall) houses the Kandern Land Registration office and the local youth center. New developments around Holzen complement the traditionally built Altdorf. Wine production is an important part of the local agriculture, with 1473 ares of vineyards in the area around the village.

==== Riedlingen ====
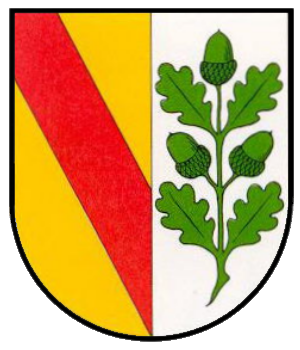

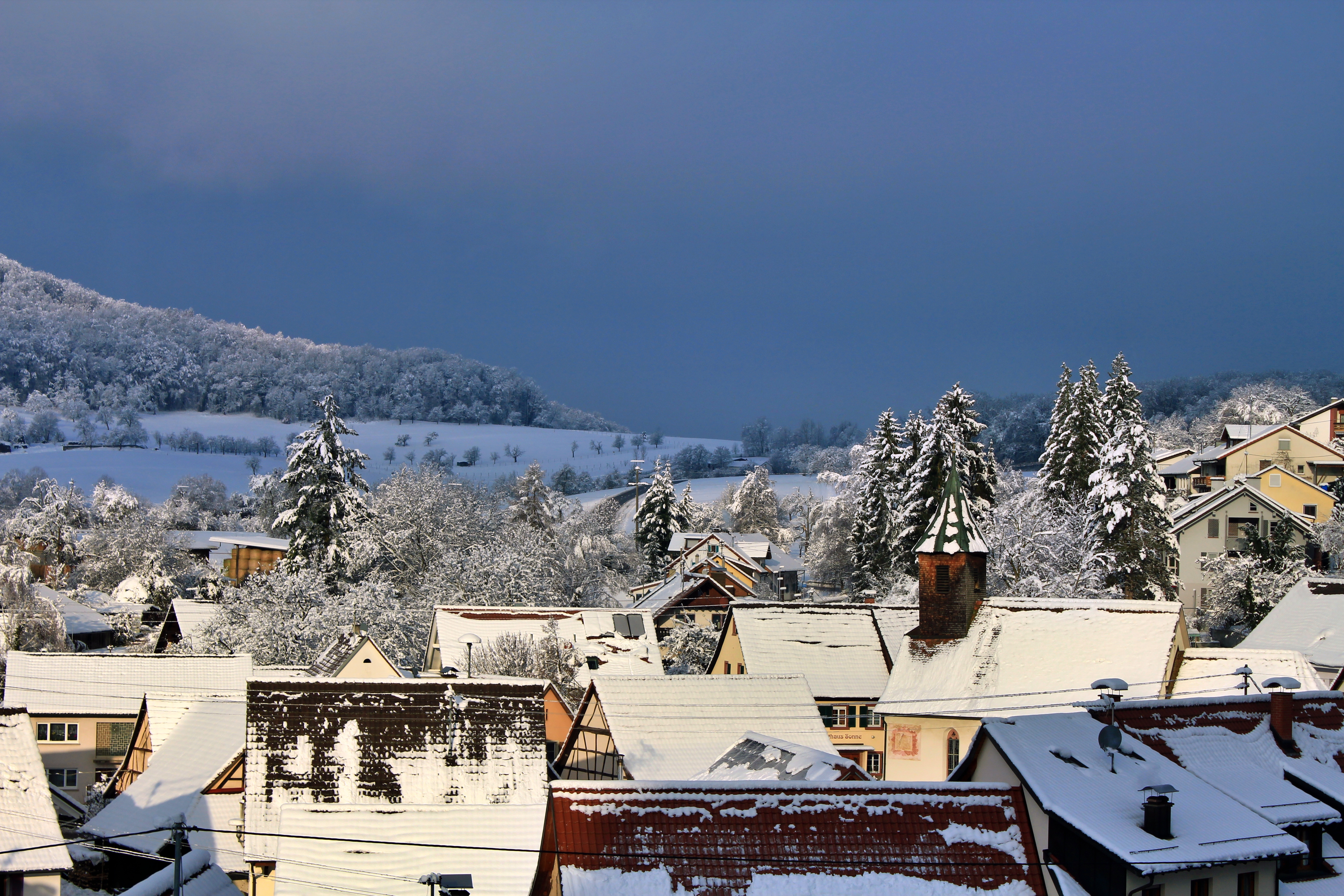
Riedlingen in Winter

The documentary evidence for the village of Riedlingen dates as far back as 972. This village in the valley of the Feuerbach creek was already settled by the early Alamanni tribes in Roman times, as excavation of burials in the area has shown. Here one finds a very traditional village center with a church and old farmhouses. New development has surrounded the old village, particularly on the slopes of the Schorner, a forested hill to the north. Riedlingen is the site of one of Kandern's industrial areas, as well as the Kandern golf course. For two weeks each summer (and occasionally in winter) the "Theater im Hof" offers modern plays in a romantic interior courtyard converted to an open-air theater.

==== Sitzenkirch ====
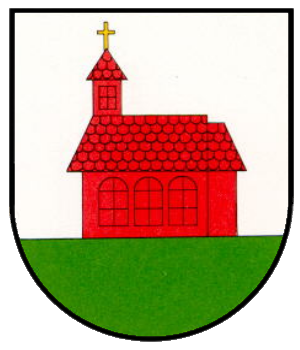

The first documented mention of Sitzenkirch was in 1120, when the village belonged to the Abbey of St. Blasien. Notable sights in the village include a Romanesque church built in 1290 and an overshot millwheel. Until the time of the Reformation there was a small convent for nuns near the church. The village was destroyed during the German Peasants' War of 1525, with only the church surviving. The church and convent remained in the possession of St. Blasien until 1805.

==== Tannenkirch ====
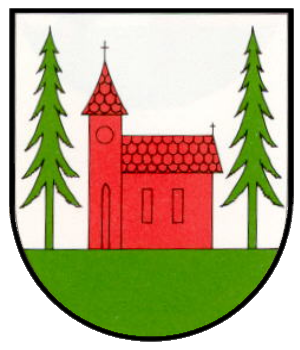

Tannenkirch was first documented in 1179. The village of Tannenkirch itself is composed of four smaller villages; Tannenkirch, Ettingen, Uttnach, and Gupf, the former three of which have grown together and are now coterminous. Due to Tannenkirch's location with good southern exposure, low precipitation, and an almost Mediterranean microclimate it is an ideal location for viniculture. An interpretive trail through the vineyards informs visitors about the traditions of wine growing. In clear weather Tannenkirch has a good view of the Alsace, the Black Forest, the Jura and the peaks of the Bernese Alps. The village church contains medieval frescoes, and a family of storks in the nest on the steeple. During the Middle Ages, the Margrave held court on the nearby Sausenhard. Kaltenherberge, today a riding stable, was originally a post station on the route from Basel to Frankfurt. Tannenkirch has its own kindergarten and grade school. The main commercial activity is agriculture and vineyards (around 2262 are - 22.62 hectares), as well as local tradesmen and an implement dealership.

==== Wollbach ====
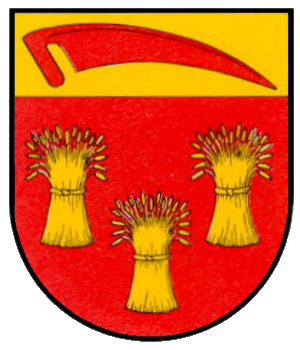

Wollbach was first documented in 767. Wollbach is the largest "suburb" of Kandern by population, and is composed of the villages of Wollbach, Egerten, Egisholz, Hammerstein, and Nebenau. There are three historical mills in Wollbach; the Hofmühle - still in operation today, the Hammersteiner Mühle - today a private house, and the Bruckmühle - currently a restaurant. In the surrounding forest there are remains of iron mines. Public facilities in Wollbach include a kindergarten, grade school, and sports hall. There are two museums in Wollbach, one of the painter Max Böhlen in his former house (today a restaurant), and a historical Lime kiln in Nebenau.

== Politics ==
=== Mayor ===
- 1996–2013: Bernhard Winterhalter (CDU)
- 2013–2020: Christian Renkert (CDU)
- since 2020: Simone Penner (independent)

=== Town council ===
The town council currently consists of 20 members, besides the mayor. The elections of June 13, 2004 had the following results

1. CDU 35.6% - 7 seats (-2)
2. FWV 27.4% - 6 seats (+1)
3. SPD 20.9% - 4 seats (=)
4. GRÜNE 16.1% - 3 seats (=)

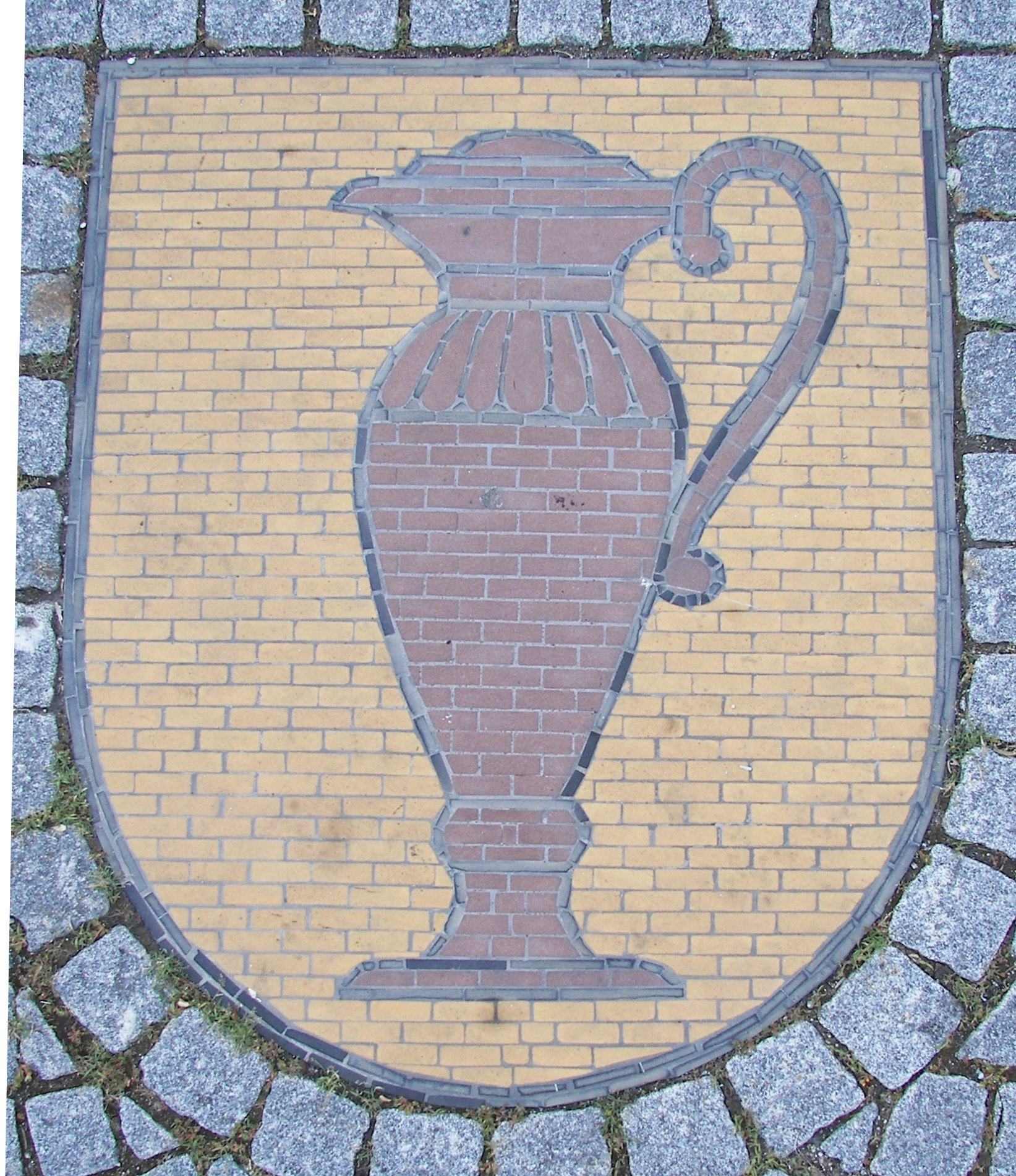
Kandern's coat of arms on the Blumenplatz

=== Coat of arms ===
The coat of arms of Kandern was granted on 11 November 1975. The blazon is Or a covered Jug Gules. The jug, or kanne, alludes to the town's name, and was first used on border stones as a village sign in the 18th century. There are no old seals known from the village. The oldest seals date from the early 19th century and show the shield bearing the jug. Since that time, all seals and images of the arms have shown this symbol, though its size and shape have changed considerably.

=== Twin towns ===
- Soufflenheim in Alsace since 1985.

== Culture and places of interest ==
=== Museums ===
Heimat- und Keramikmuseum Kandern (Homeland and Ceramic Museum)

The museum was opened in 1776 in a stepped gable house from the 16th century. In addition to many documents and items from Kandern's history, the museum has a large collection of local pottery from the medieval times to the present.
The first floor contains a wide variety of utilitarian pottery made in Kandern through the ages. The second floor is dedicated to artistic pottery, including work from Max Laeuger, one of the pioneers of modern German pottery, pieces from the Fayence-Manufaktur Kandern (1927–1938), Richard Bampi, Horst Kerstan, and current artists.
Historical artifacts include a copy of the "Goldenen Sau von Kandern" (Golden Sow of Kandern), a drinking pitcher in the shape of a wild boar commissioned by the Margrave in 1605 to commemorate a successful hunt in the Kandern area. The original is in the Badischen Landesmuseum in Karlsruhe. In addition, the museum has items from the Battle of Kandern, an important battle in the Badische Revolution of

The Bernese painter, Max Böhlen (1902–1971), lived and worked from 1939 in Kandern-Egerten. His house is now a restaurant with a museum which retains the impressions of the artist and a cross - section of his work.

=== Museumscafé Riedlingen ===
The Museumscafe is located in the manor house of the Riedlingen's former tithe barn, built in 1825. The museum contains toy collection including over 50 dollhouses and many stuffed bears.

=== Important structures ===
- Blumenplatz - a marketplace framed by classical, uniform row houses.
- John Sutter's birthplace
- Sausenburg Castle - ruins of a castle from the 13th century.
- Schloss Bürgeln - a former abbey and provost's palace begun in the 10th century.

== Economy and infrastructure ==
Iron ore mining was an important activity in Kandern area until the 19th century, but is no longer practiced.

=== Transport ===
The A 98 autobahn from Weil am Rhein to Stockach and the B 3 federal highway from Buxtehude to Weil am Rhein connect Kandern to the long distance traffic network. The Chanderli heritage railway runs along the route of the former Kander Valley Railway from Kandern to Haltingen. The nearest airport is Basel-Mulhouse-Freiburg Airport, located 26 km (16 mi) south west of Kandern.

=== Education ===
The August Macke School Centre in Kandern consists of a Hauptschule and a Realschule. There are grade schools (grades 1 - 4) in Kandern and Tannenkirch. In addition, there are two communal and two Lutheran kindergartens, and one private Waldorf kindergarten. Black Forest Academy (BFA), an English-speaking private school (grades 5-12) is also located in Kandern. There is also a bi-lingual grade school located in Wollbach (grades 1-4) associated with the Freie Evangelische Schule in Lörrach.

== Notable residents ==
=== Born in Kandern ===
- John Sutter (1803–1880), pioneer

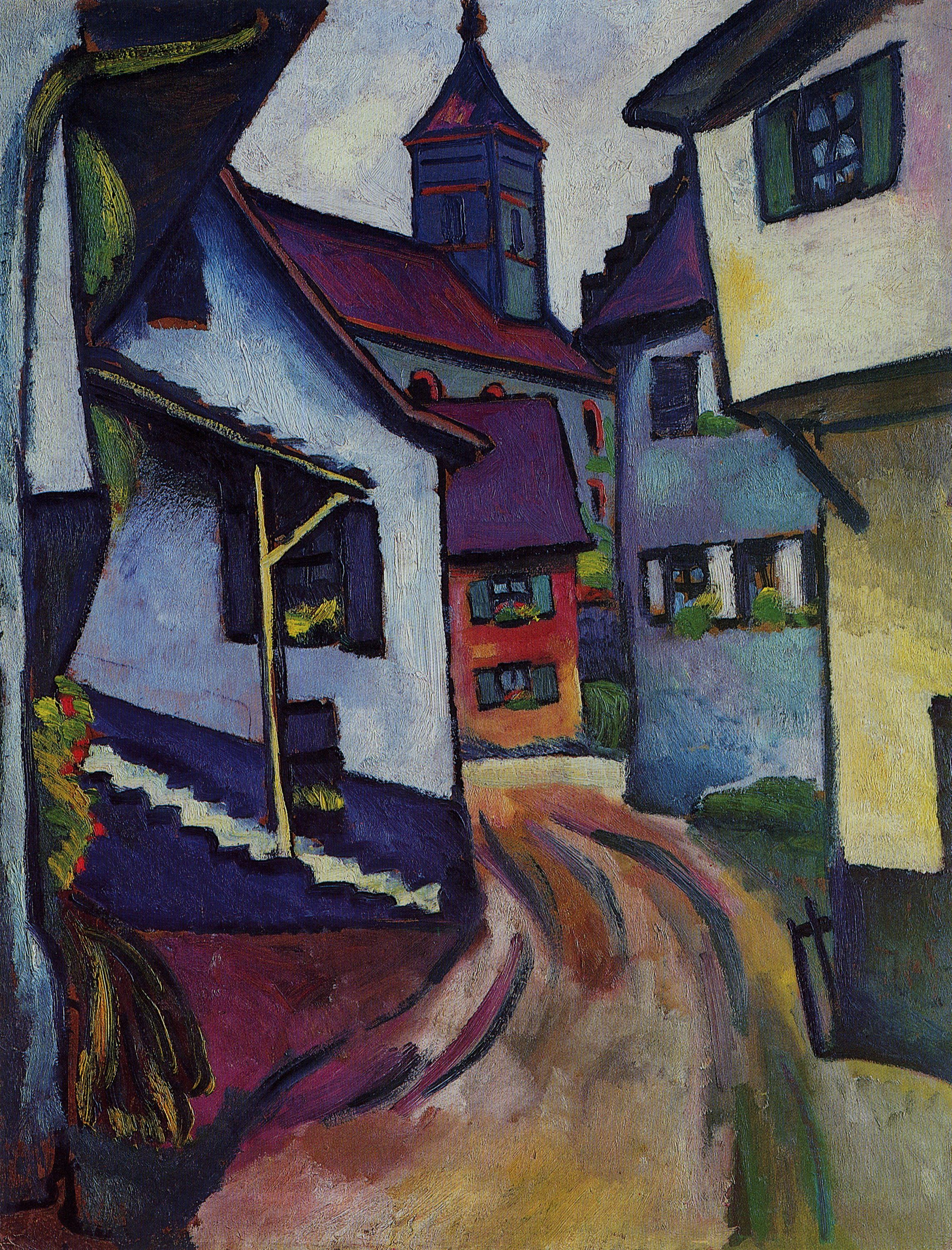
Straße mit Kirche in Kandern by August Macke

=== Resided in Kandern ===
- Adolf Kussmaul (1822–1902), Doctor and medical pioneer, practiced for a time in 1850 in Kandern
- August Macke (1887–1914), expressionist painter, used Kandern streets as a subject
- Max Böhlen (1902–1971), painter who lived and painted in Kandern-Egerten from 1939 to his death in 1971

== Bibliography ==
- Scheer, Volker G.: Kandern. Stadt seit 1810. Ereignisse, Personen und Bilder der Kanderner Stadtgeschichte seit der Stadterhebung und bekannte und bedeutende Personen aus der älteren Geschichte Kanderns, Todtnauberg: Scheer, 2nd revised and expanded edition, 2006, 520 pp., 367 ill., ISBN 3-00-016504-5

== See also ==
- Kander River in Switzerland
