= Fischingen (disambiguation) =

Fischingen may refer to:

- Fischingen, a municipality in the district of Münchwilen in the canton of Thurgau in Switzerland
  - Fischingen Abbey, a Benedictine monastery situated in Fischingen in the Canton of Thurgau, Switzerland
- Fischingen, Baden-Württemberg, a town in the district of Lörrach in Baden-Württemberg in Germany
