= Wollbach (Kander) =

River in Germany

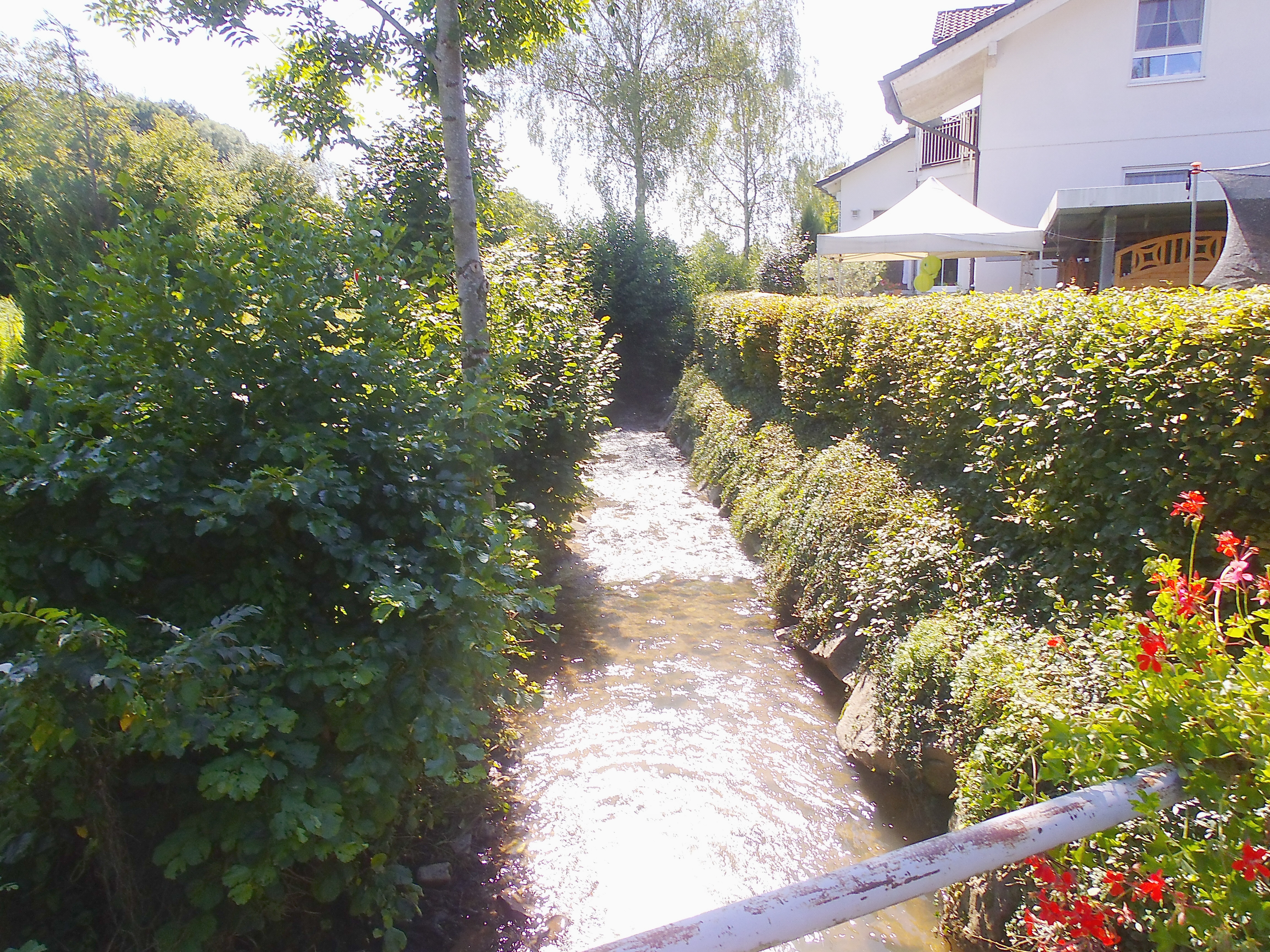

Location
- Country: Germany
- State: Baden-Württemberg

Physical characteristics
- Mouth
  - location: Kander
  - coordinates: 47.6668°N 7.6436°E

Basin features
- Progression: Kander→ Rhine→ North Sea

Wollbach is a river of Baden-Württemberg, Germany. It is a left tributary of the Kander in Wollbach, a parish of Kandern.

== See also ==
- List of rivers of Baden-Württemberg
