= Kander (Germany) =

River in Germany

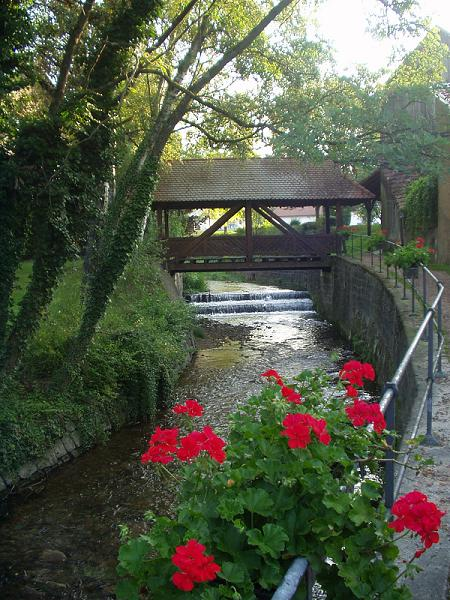
- The river as it flows through Kandern

Location
- Country: Germany
- State: Baden-Württemberg

Physical characteristics
- Source
  - location: Hochblauen, Germany
  - coordinates: 47°46′42″N 07°42′05″E
  - elevation: 1,000 m (3,300 ft)
- Mouth
  - location: Rhine, Germany
  - coordinates: 47.6308°N 07.5691°E
  - elevation: 250 m (820 ft)
- Length: 30.0 km (18.6 mi)
- Basin size: 94 km^{2} (36 sq mi)
- Discharge
  - location: Rhine

Basin features
- Tributaries
  - right: Lippisbach, Feuerbach, Wollbach
- Progression: Rhine→ North Sea

The Kander is a small river flowing from the southern Black Forest westward into the major German revier, the Rhine.

== Geography ==
The Kander rises at the head of the Kandertal on the Blauen in the Black Forest. Within the first 10 km of its course to Kandern, the Kander loses 650m of elevation. The stream has a total length of 30 km and a drop of 750m to its mouth on the Rhine near the community Märkt of the town Weil am Rhein.

== History ==
The name Kander comes from the Celtic word kandera, meaning clear flowing.

== Transport uses ==
Due to the stream's small size it has no transportation function.

== See also ==
- List of rivers of Germany
  - List of rivers of Baden-Württemberg
