= Peterskirche, Blansingen =

Church in Efringen-Kirchen, Baden-Württemberg, Germany

Coordinates: 47°41′33″N 7°32′51″E

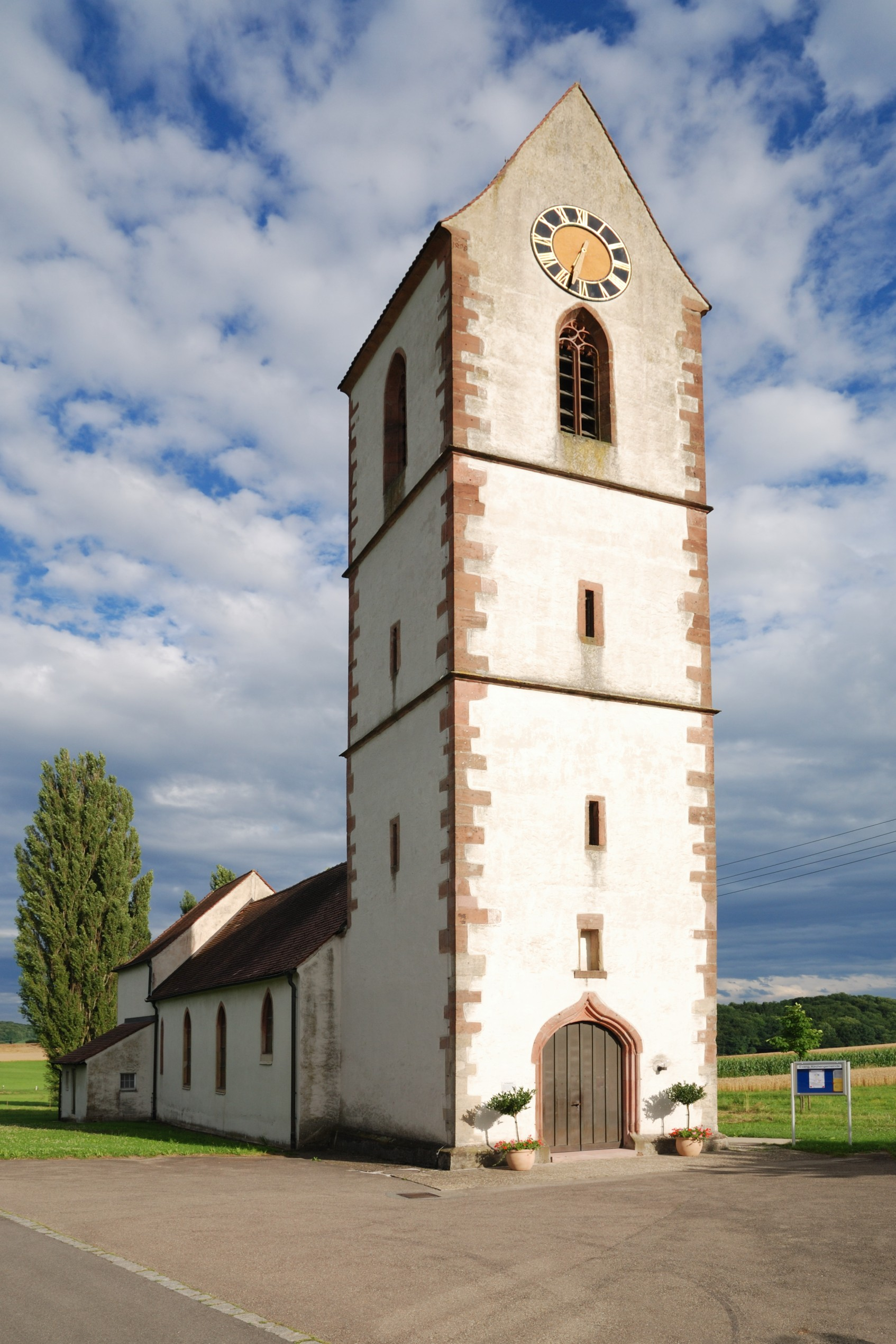
West side of Church with tower

Peterskirche (St. Peter's Church) is a church in the municipality of Efringen-Kirchen, Baden-Württemberg in south-west of Germany. It was first mentioned in 1173. The current late-Gothic religious building was constructed in 1457 and contains a notable series of paintings from the 15th century. The paintings are Fresco-secco style.
