= Vorderes Kandertal =

- Gemeindeverwaltungsverband
- Location of Vorderes Kandertal within Lörrach district
- Interactive map of Vorderes Kandertal
- Location within Germany Location within Baden-Württemberg
- Coordinates: 47°38′N 7°37′E
- Country: Germany
- State: Baden-Württemberg
- Admin. region: Freiburg
- District: Lörrach
- Seat: Binzen
- Subdivisions: 6 municipalities

Area
  - Total: 24.16 km^{2} (9.33 sq mi)

Population (2025-12-31)
  - Total: 9,914
  - Density: 410.3/km^{2} (1,063/sq mi)
- Time zone: UTC+01:00 (CET)
  - Summer (DST): UTC+02:00 (CEST)
- Website: www.gvv-vk.de

Vorderes Kandertal is a Gemeindeverwaltungsverband in the district of Lörrach in Baden-Württemberg, Germany. The seat of the Gemeindeverwaltungsverband is in Binzen.

The Gemeindeverwaltungsverband Vorderes Kandertal consists of the following municipalities:

1. Binzen
2. Eimeldingen
3. Fischingen
4. Rümmingen
5. Schallbach
6. Wittlingen
