= Blauen =

Blauen may refer to:

- Blauen (Badenweiler), a mountain in the Black Forest, Germany
- Blauen, Basel-Landschaft, municipality in the canton of Basel-Country in Switzerland
