= Blauen (Badenweiler) =

Mountain in Germany

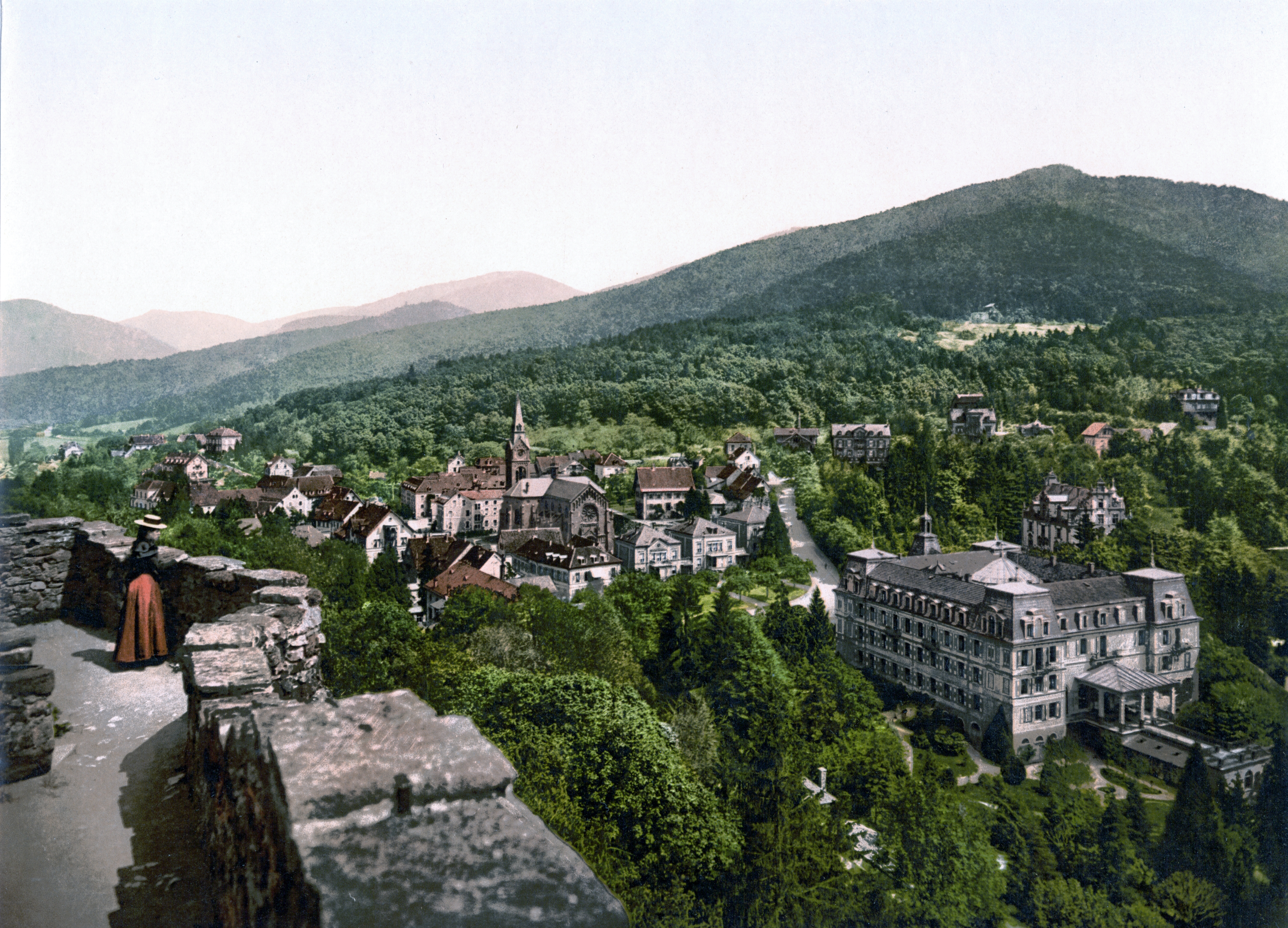
- The Hochblauen as seen from Badenweiler on an old postcard (c. 1900)

Highest point
- Elevation: 1,165 m (3,822 ft)
- Prominence: 813 m (2,667 ft)
- Coordinates: 47°46′39″N 7°42′4″E

Naming
- Language of name: German

Geography
- Location within Baden-Württemberg
- Location: Baden-Württemberg, Germany
- Parent range: Black Forest

Climbing
- Easiest route: Drive K160 (Kandertalstraße) through Marzell or L140 through Friedrichsheim

Blauen or Hochblauen is a 1,165-metre-high (3,820 ft) mountain in the southern Black Forest. The peak lies within the municipalities of Schliengen and Malsburg-Marzell in Landkreis Lörrach and the community of Badenweiler in Breisgau-Hochschwarzwald. It is an ideal viewpoint with views of the Black Forest, Vosges, Jura Mountains, and the Alps.

== Name ==
In the 14th century, the mountain was recorded as the Blauwen or Blawen. Matthäus Merian's Topographia Sueviae in the mid-17th century calls it the Hoche Blawen ("High Blawen"). The parish boundary plan of the first Baden state survey of 1769/1770 distinguishes between the Hoch Blauen ("High Blauen") and the Hinter Blauen ("Posterior Blauen"), a 1,087-metre-high (3,565 ft) sub-peak, 700 metres (2,295 ft) north-northeast of the main summit. As the Blauen M[ons] the mountain is shown on the Black Forest map owned by St. Blaise Abbey dating to the year 1788. And in 1845 in the Topographischen Atlas ueber das Grossherzogtum Baden ("Topographic Atlas of the Grand Duchy of Baden") it is called the Blauen, as in other geographical publications of the 19th century. In addition in 19th century travel literature the name Hochblauen occurs frequently, sometimes with the explanation that this is to distinguish it from the Zeller Blauen, 12 kilometres (7 mi) away. In fact, the name Hochblauen was normal for the latter on as shown on topographic maps of the time, while the mountain near Badenweiler can still be found on maps today as the Blauen.

The name Blauen is borne by various mountains, hills and settlements in Germany and Switzerland. In 1880 in his book on Upper German place names, Oberdeutschen Flurnamenbuch, the cultural historian, Michel Buck, made a connexion between the name Blauen and historical mining activity, by proposing that name was derived from the word Bla = smeltery. However, it could also be derived from the blue colour (German: Blau = "blue") of coniferous forests or the bluish hue of a mountain when seen from a distance.

== Access ==
The High Blauen Road (Hochblauenstraße) was opened to private vehicles in 1928. About half the route is in the county of Freiburg-Hochschwarzwald. In its northwestern section it thus bears the designation K 4948, in the southeastern section it runs under the number K 6314, where the Wollbach highway agency is responsible. Winter clearance of the whole route is undertaken by the Müllheim highway agency by arrangement between the counties. The road runs to the top. Since 2011 during the summer months there has also been a bus route that links the summit on Sundays and holidays via Marzell and Kandern with Basel. In addition, variant A of the West Way, a long-distance path maintained by the Black Forest Club that runs for 280 kilometres (170 mi) from Pforzheim to Basel, goes over Blauen.

Between 1957 and 1980 there was a reallocation of land in the mountain forest which, after comprehensive and expensive survey work, resulted in 42 small parcels of land being consolidated into twelve larger ones. To commemorate this, a monument was erected in 2007 with a brass plate that records the names of all the participants.

Tourist facilities on Blauen first appeared in 1872 when a covered forest inn (Waldschenke) was opened. In June 1875 the first house was opened; it bore the name Krone des Blauen ("Crown of Blauen"). It was expanded in 1890 and again in 1965–1966, in order to handle the increase number of tourists.

The water main installed in 1898 is still used and runs 150 metres (490 ft) down to a spring. Since 1925, when a cable was laid to Blauen from Marzell there has been electricity at the summit. Three years later the first motorised vehicles made their way up the mountain road.

At the summit is the Berghaus Hochblauen (also called the Blauenhaus), an inn with overnight accommodation. Since spring 2013 the inn has been closed. In 2015 it was being modified and should be open in 2016.

=== Towers ===
A steel lattice observation tower was built in 1895 here by the Black Forest Club, replacing a rather low wooden tower dating to 1875. It was inaugurated on 30 August 1895 and fully restored in 1984 with the funding from the Bundespost. The originally 14-metre-high (46 ft) tower has a total height today, including antenna, of 21 metres (69 ft). It is open at all times. In 1985 not more than one hundred metres (330 ft) south-southeast of the observation tower, a transmission tower, the Sender Blauen, was built. It is not open to the public and restricts the view of the Alps from the observation tower.

Northeast of the Hochblauen, at a height of 1,074 metres (3,524 ft), lies what is probably the highest castle site in Baden-Württembergs, Stockberg Castle.

Since summer 2011 there have been discussions about erecting a wind farm on Blauen with three generators to produce electricity.

== Transmission tower ==
Also at the peak stands a 93-metre-high Deutsche Telekom VHF and microwave radio relay tower. The tower is a reinforced concrete Typenturm, built in 1985. The following radio stations are broadcast from this tower: SWR1 Baden-Württemberg (89.2 FM/8.4 kW), SWR2 (92.6 FM/8.4 kW), SWR3 (97.0 FM/8,4 kW), Deutschlandfunk (105.1 FM/10 kW), Radio Regenbogen (101.1 FM/8,4 kW) und baden.fm (106.0 FM/8,4 kW). The tower is also used by the amateur radio repeater DB0YE.

The tower serves mainly the southern Upper Rhine valley as well as a large portion of the Breisgau-Hochschwarzwald and Lörrach rural districts. The stations transmitted from Blauen are also easily received in northwestern Switzerland. Until the end of the 1980s the former SWF broadcast could be heard well beyond the Vosges mountains to the west. Since then the power of the transmissions toward France have been limited by international agreements.

== Gallery ==
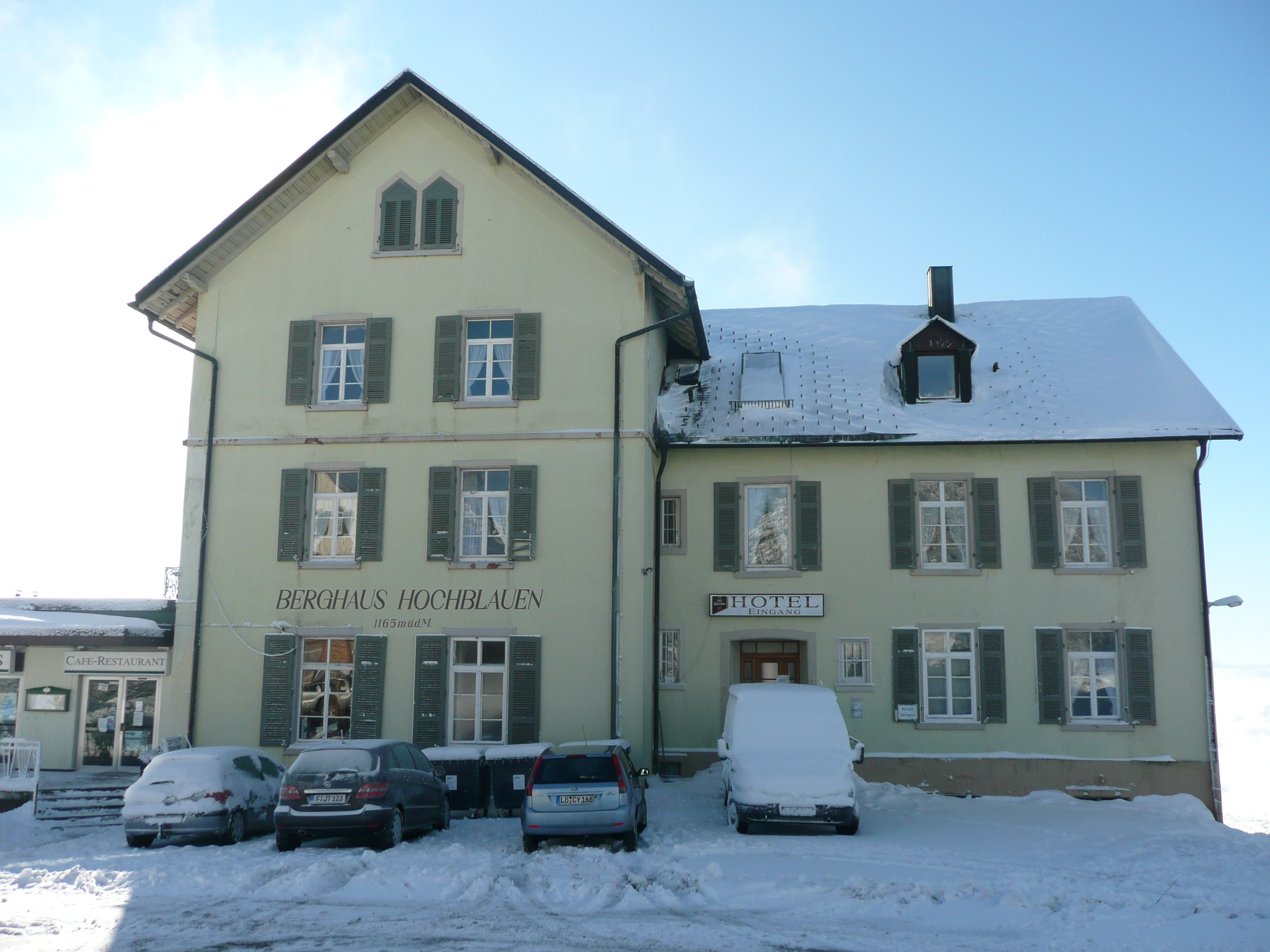
The Berghaus Hochblauen

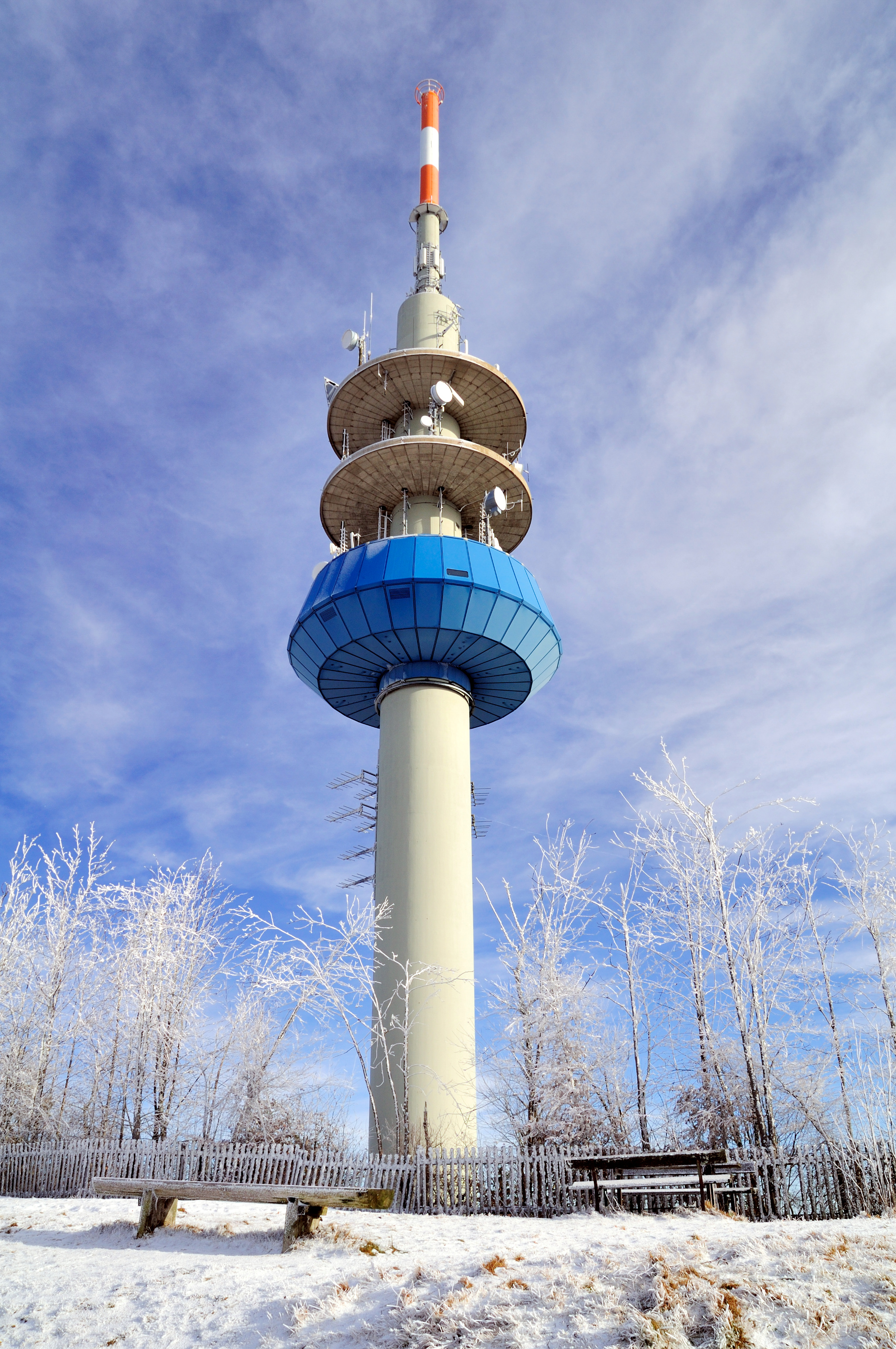
Sender Blauen

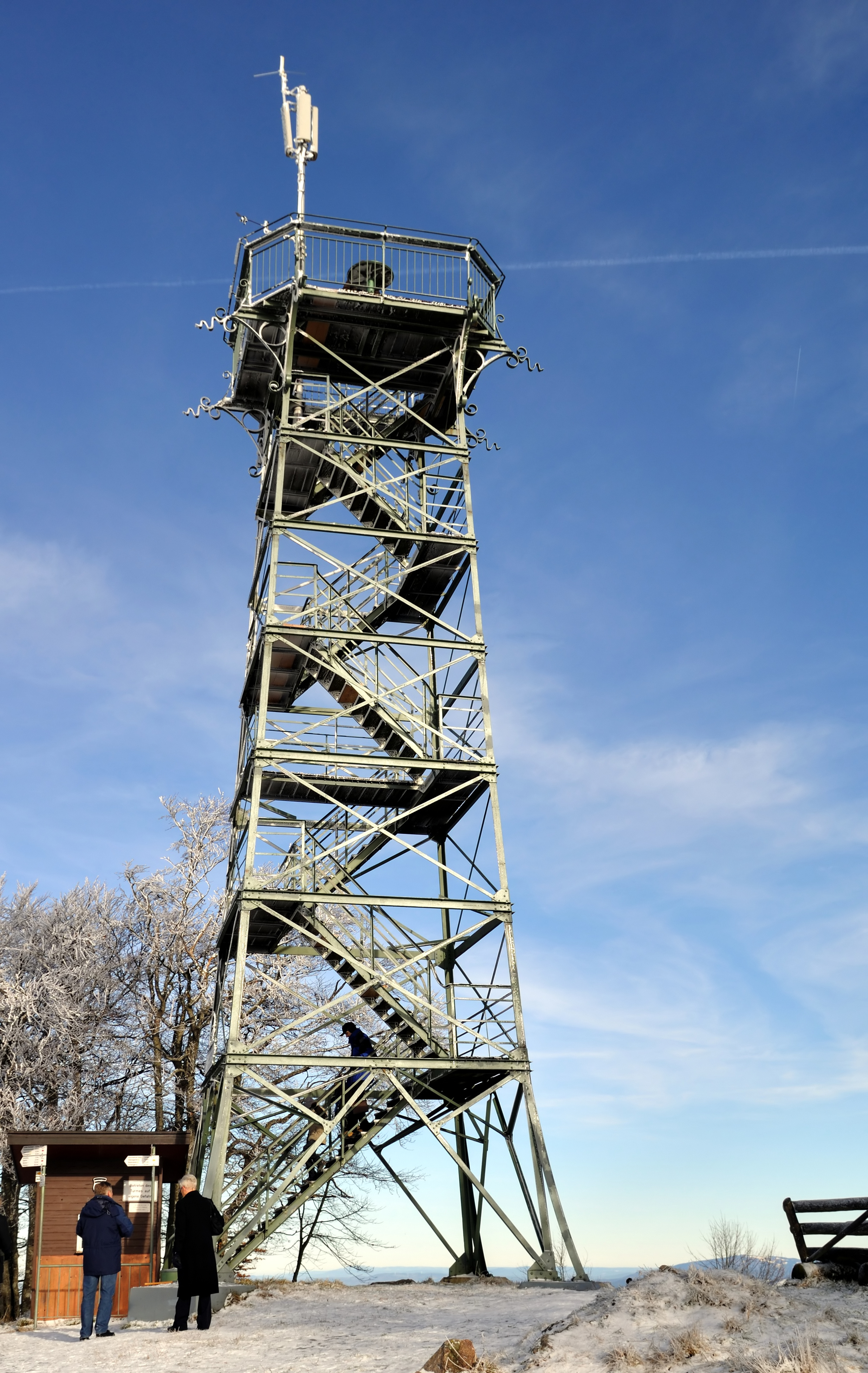
The observation tower in winter

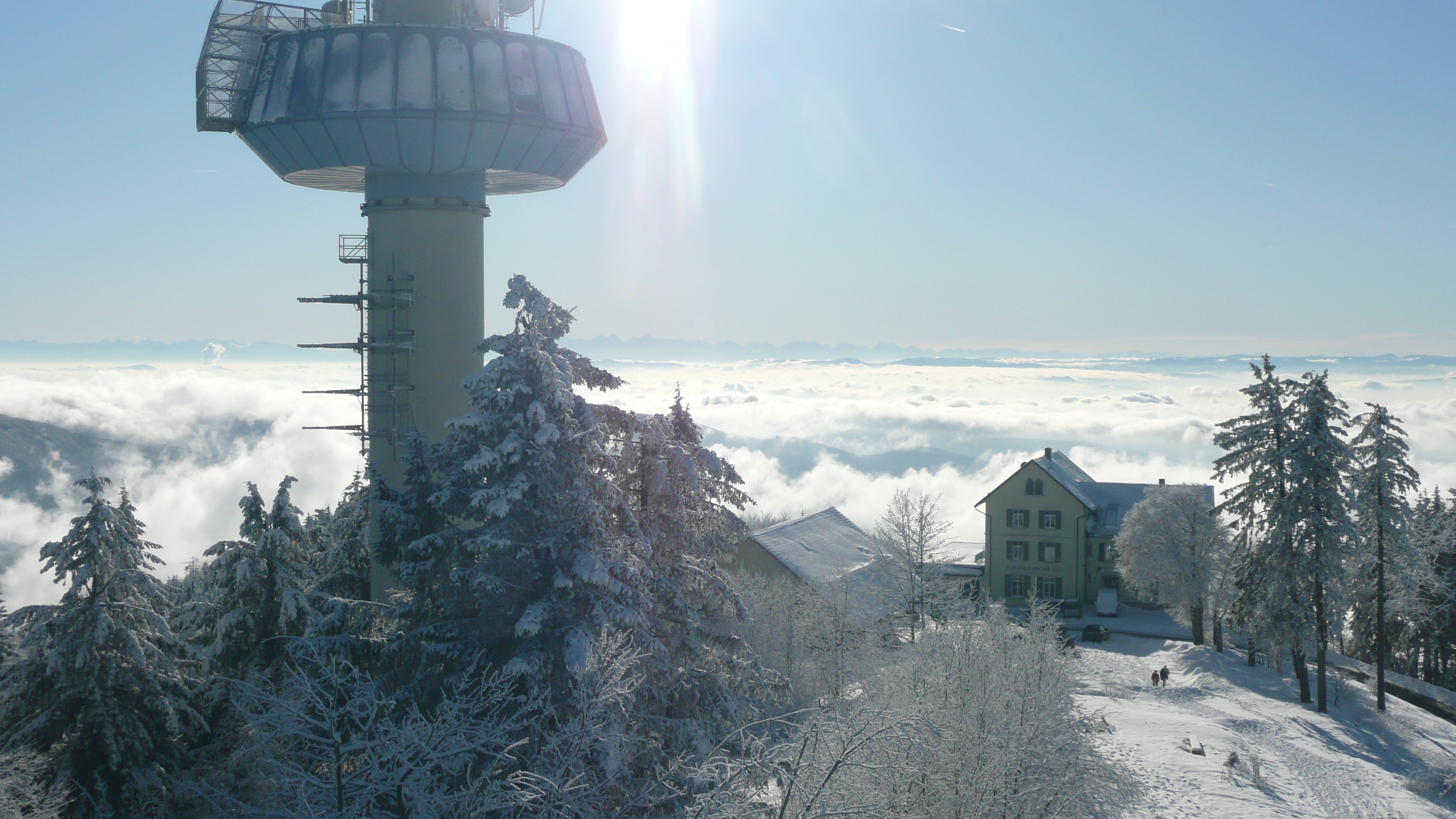
View from the observation tower looking south

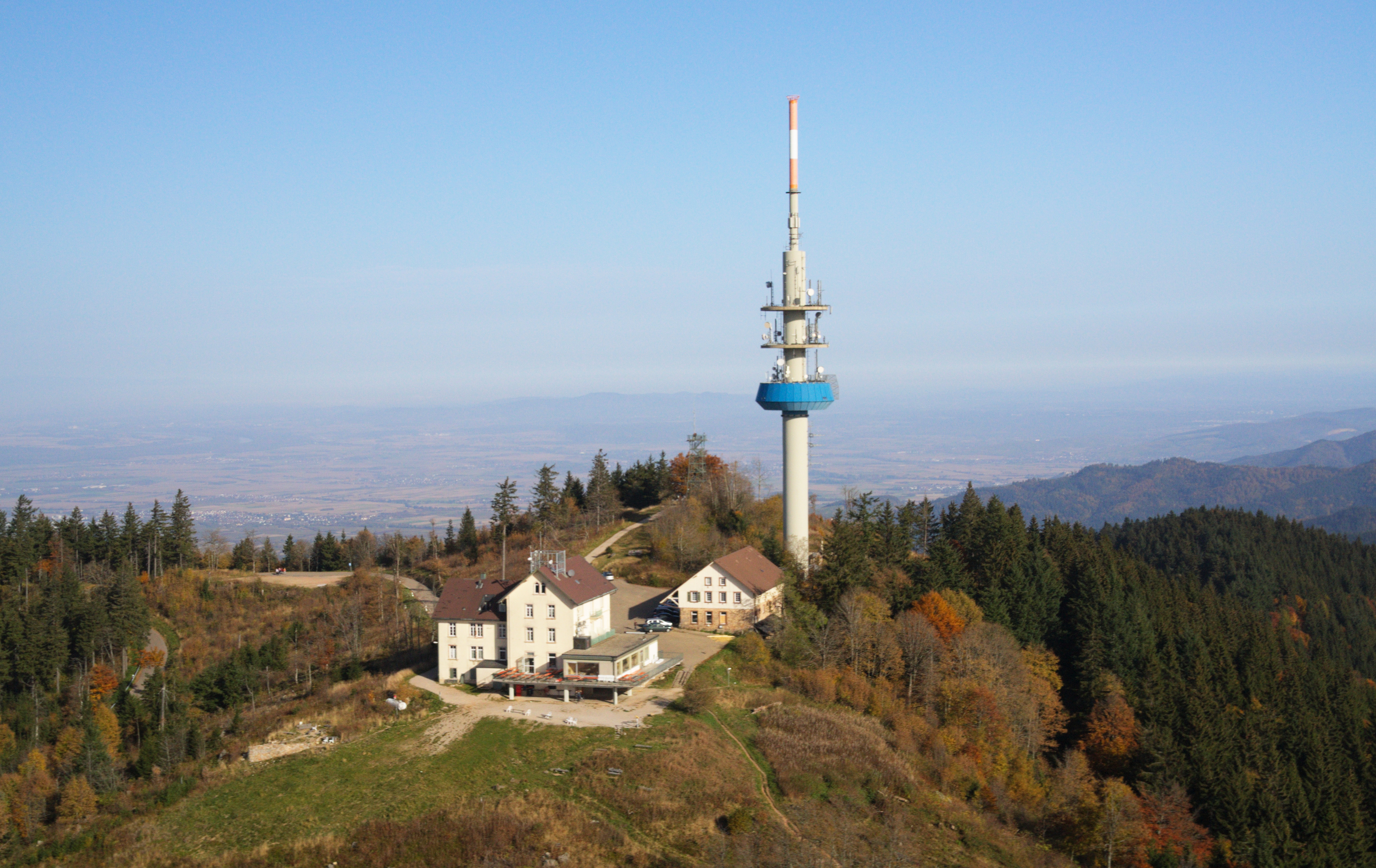
Aerial photograph of the summit of Blauen

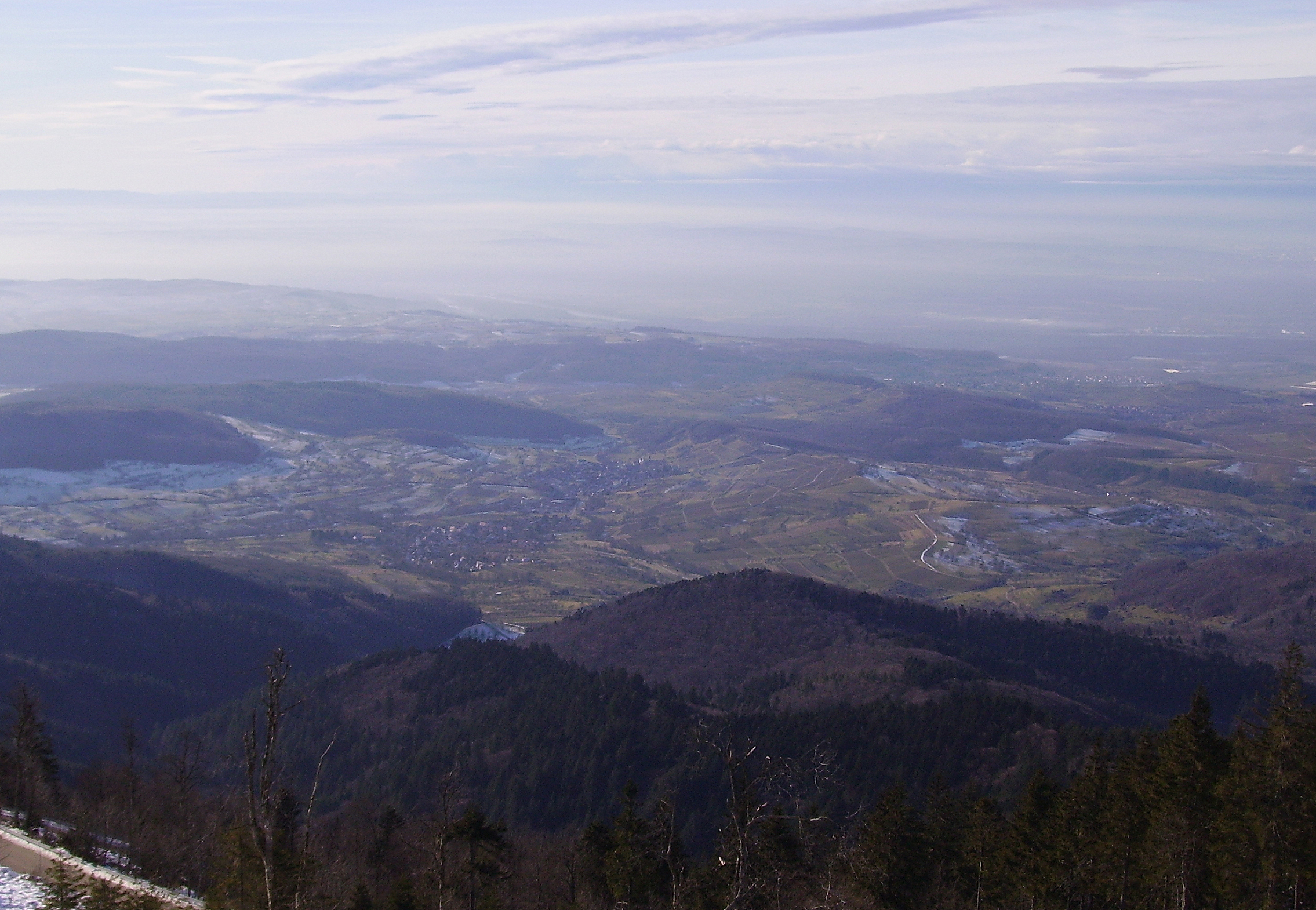
View from the Hochblauen over the Rhine valley

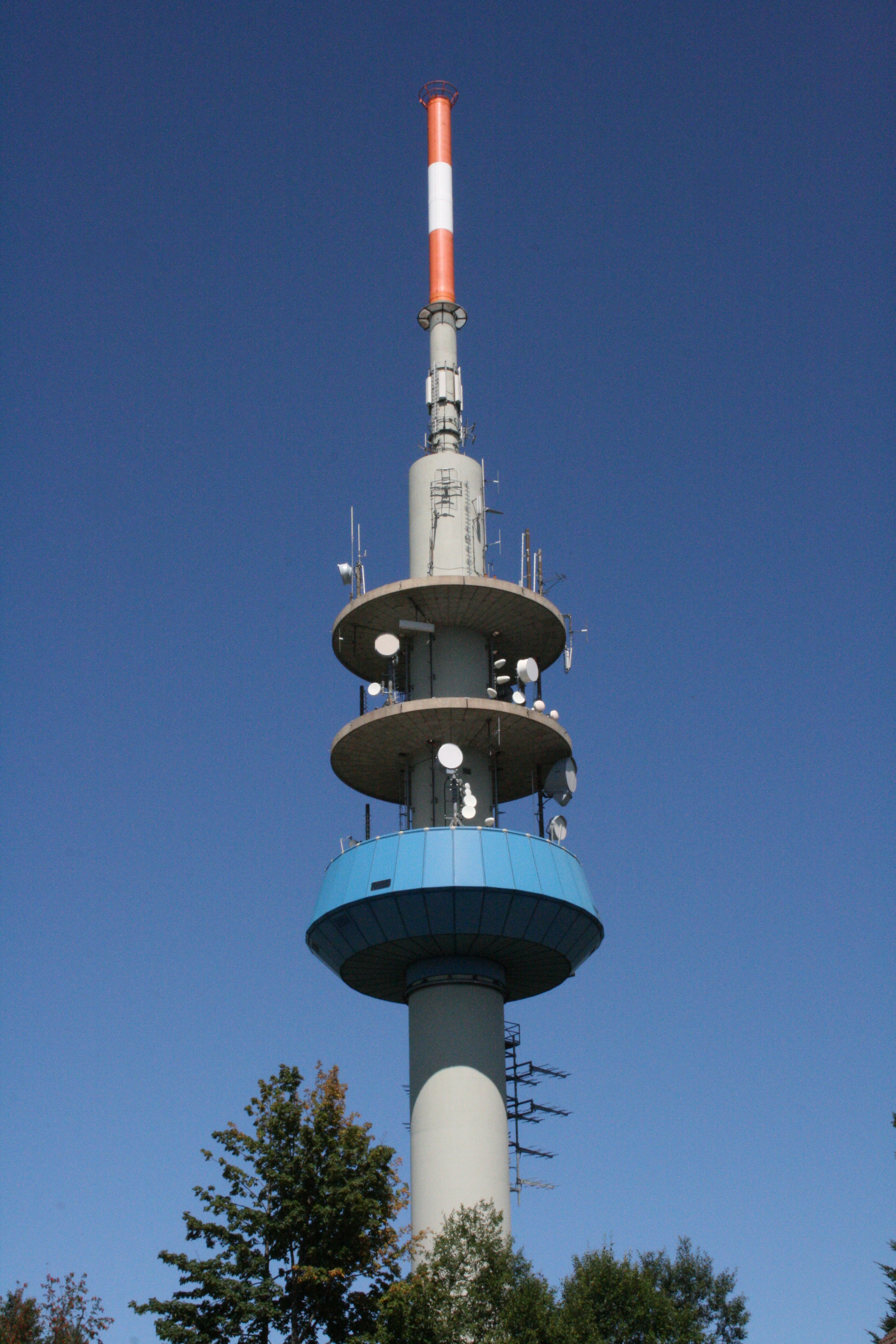
Radio Tower
