= Max Böhlen =

Swiss painter

Max Böhlen (1902–1971) was a Swiss painter. A large part of his work can be visited today in the hunting lodge, which the painter acquired in 1939 in Egerten for his family. His youngest son Andreas Böhlen still lives there and guides visitors through the exhibition rooms themselves.
