= Eimeldingen =

- Municipality
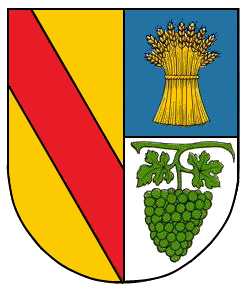
- Coat of arms

- Location of Eimeldingen within Lörrach district
- Interactive map of Eimeldingen
- Location within Germany Location within Baden-Württemberg
- Coordinates: 47°37′50″N 07°35′41″E
- Country: Germany
- State: Baden-Württemberg
- Admin. region: Freiburg
- District: Lörrach
- Municipal assoc.: Vorderes Kandertal

Government
  - Mayor (2016–24): Oliver Friebolin

Area
  - Total: 3.55 km^{2} (1.37 sq mi)
- Elevation: 269 m (883 ft)

Population (2025-12-31)
  - Total: 2,515
  - Density: 708/km^{2} (1,830/sq mi)
- Time zone: UTC+01:00 (CET)
  - Summer (DST): UTC+02:00 (CEST)
- Postal codes: 79591
- Dialling codes: 07621
- Vehicle registration: LÖ
- Website: www.eimeldingen.de

Eimeldingen (German pronunciation: [ˈaɪml̩dɪŋən]; Alemannic German: Eimeldinge) is a municipality in the district of Lörrach, in Baden-Württemberg, Germany.
