= Schallbach =

- Municipality
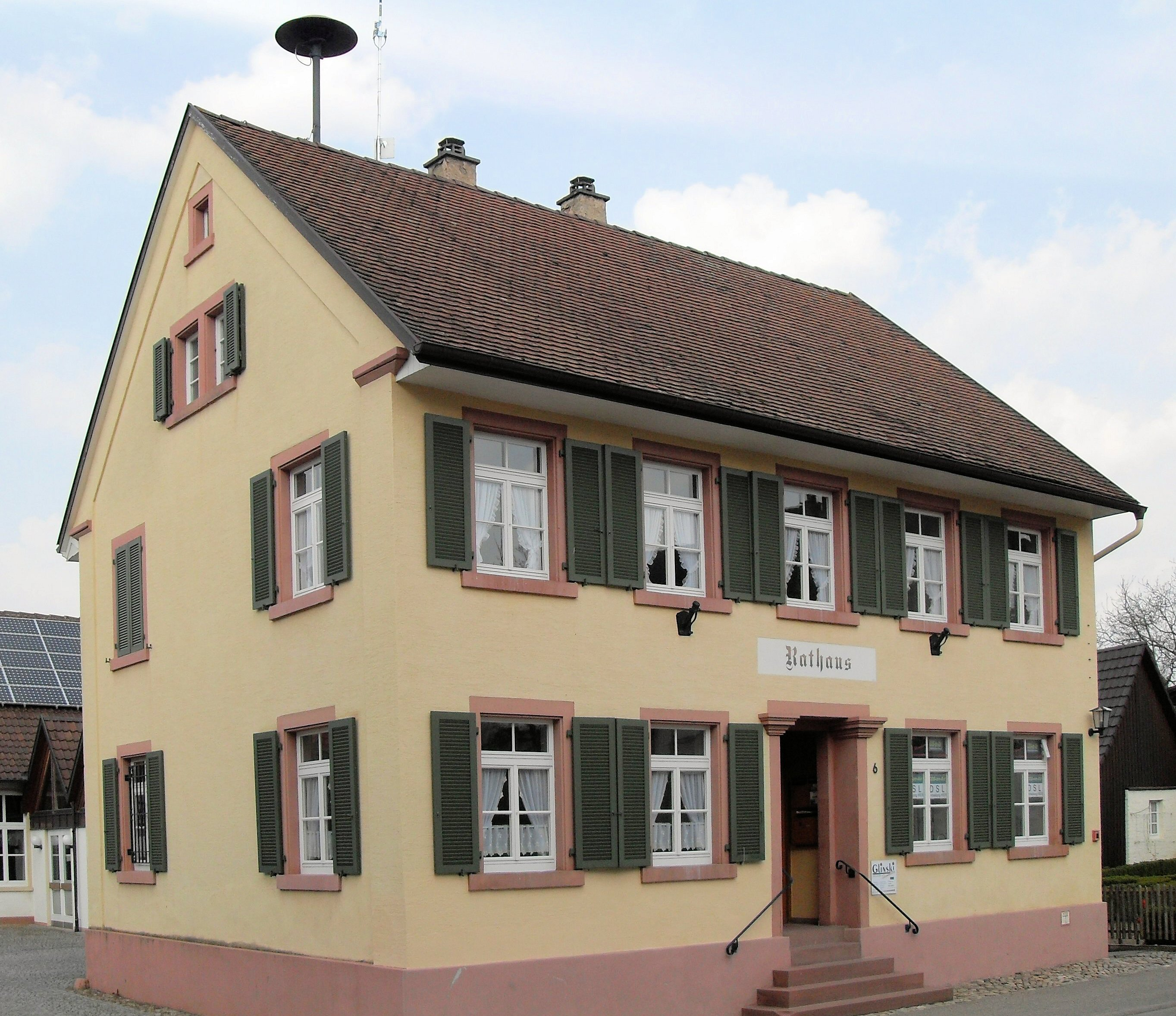
- Schallbach town hall

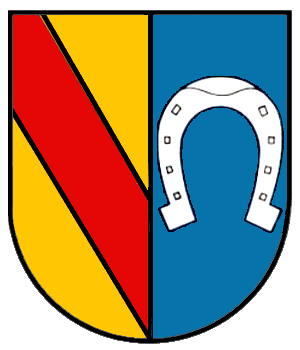
- Coat of arms

- Location of Schallbach within Lörrach district
- Interactive map of Schallbach
- Location within Germany Location within Baden-Württemberg
- Coordinates: 47°39′16″N 07°37′36″E
- Country: Germany
- State: Baden-Württemberg
- Admin. region: Freiburg
- District: Lörrach
- Municipal assoc.: Vorderes Kandertal

Government
  - Mayor (2021–29): Christian Iselin

Area
  - Total: 3.95 km^{2} (1.53 sq mi)
- Elevation: 301 m (988 ft)

Population (2025-12-31)
  - Total: 837
  - Density: 212/km^{2} (549/sq mi)
- Time zone: UTC+01:00 (CET)
  - Summer (DST): UTC+02:00 (CEST)
- Postal codes: 79597
- Dialling codes: 07621
- Vehicle registration: LÖ
- Website: www.schallbach.de

Schallbach (German pronunciation: [ˈʃalbax]) is a municipality in the district of Lörrach in Baden-Württemberg in Germany.
