= Fischingen, Baden-Württemberg =

Fischingen
- Municipality
- Coat of arms

- Location of Fischingen within Lörrach district
- Interactive map of Fischingen
- Location within Germany Location within Baden-Württemberg
- Coordinates: 47°39′N 07°36′E
- Country: Germany
- State: Baden-Württemberg
- Admin. region: Freiburg
- District: Lörrach
- Municipal assoc.: Vorderes Kandertal

Government
  - Mayor (2018–26): Axel Moick

Area
  - Total: 1.89 km^{2} (0.73 sq mi)
- Elevation: 280 m (920 ft)

Population (2025-12-31)
  - Total: 768
  - Density: 406/km^{2} (1,050/sq mi)
- Time zone: UTC+01:00 (CET)
  - Summer (DST): UTC+02:00 (CEST)
- Postal codes: 79592
- Dialling codes: 07628
- Vehicle registration: LÖ
- Website: www.fischingen.de

Fischingen (German pronunciation: [ˈfɪʃɪŋən]; Alemannic German: Fischige) is a municipality in the district of Lörrach in Baden-Württemberg in Germany.
