= Malsburg-Marzell =

- Municipality
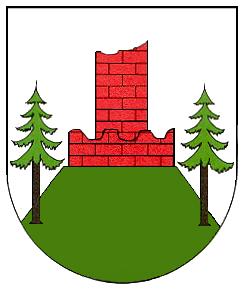
- Coat of arms

- Location of Malsburg-Marzell within Lörrach district
- Interactive map of Malsburg-Marzell
- Location within Germany Location within Baden-Württemberg
- Coordinates: 47°46′15″N 07°43′32″E
- Country: Germany
- State: Baden-Württemberg
- Admin. region: Freiburg
- District: Lörrach

Government
  - Mayor (2018–26): Mario Thomas Singer

Area
  - Total: 24.92 km^{2} (9.62 sq mi)
- Elevation: 495 m (1,624 ft)

Population (2025-12-31)
  - Total: 1,498
  - Density: 60.11/km^{2} (155.7/sq mi)
- Time zone: UTC+01:00 (CET)
  - Summer (DST): UTC+02:00 (CEST)
- Postal codes: 79429
- Dialling codes: 07626
- Vehicle registration: LÖ
- Website: www.malsburg-marzell.de

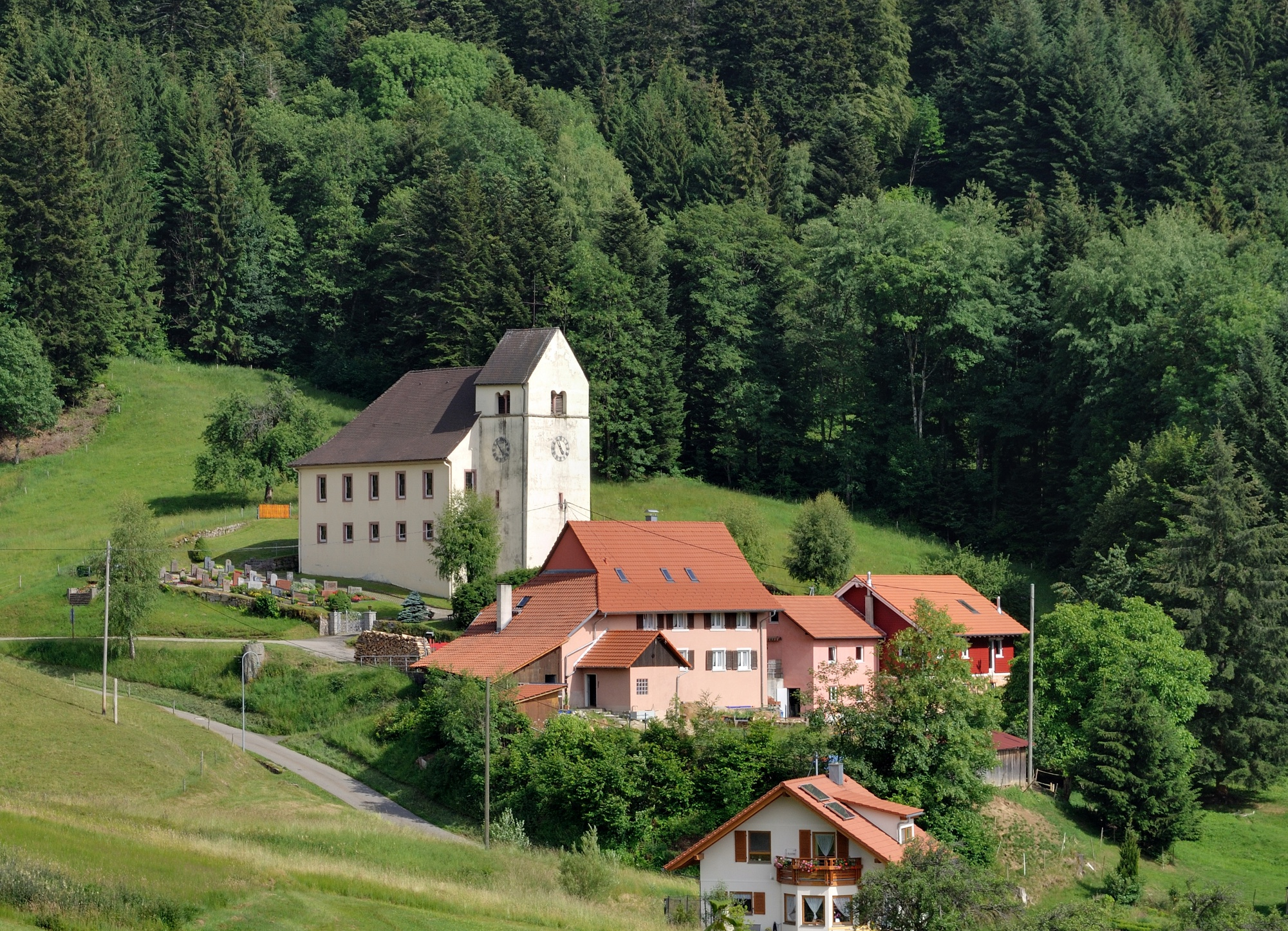
Kaltenbach: Protestant Church in Malsburg

Malsburg-Marzell is a municipality in the district of Lörrach in Baden-Württemberg in Germany. Its coat of arms bears a wooded hill on which rests a castle ruin. This is a reference to the nearby Sausenburg.

In the municipal area southeast of Hochblauen lies what is probably the highest castle site in Baden-Württemberg, Stockburg Castle .

== Demographics ==
Population development:

Year	Inhabitants
1990	1.605
2001	1.528
2011	1.485
2021	1.463
