= Efringen-Kirchen =

- Municipality
- Coat of arms

- Location of Efringen-Kirchen within Lörrach district
- Interactive map of Efringen-Kirchen
- Location within Germany Location within Baden-Württemberg
- Coordinates: 47°39′20″N 7°33′57″E
- Country: Germany
- State: Baden-Württemberg
- Admin. region: Freiburg
- District: Lörrach
- Subdivisions: 9

Government
  - Mayor (2022–30): Carolin Holzmüller (FDP)

Area
  - Total: 43.74 km^{2} (16.89 sq mi)
- Elevation: 258 m (846 ft)

Population (2025-12-31)
  - Total: 8,704
  - Density: 199.0/km^{2} (515.4/sq mi)
- Time zone: UTC+01:00 (CET)
  - Summer (DST): UTC+02:00 (CEST)
- Postal codes: 79588
- Dialling codes: 07628
- Vehicle registration: LÖ
- Website: www.efringen-kirchen.de

Efringen-Kirchen is a municipality in the district of Lörrach in Baden-Württemberg, Germany.

== Fortifications ==
During World War I fortifications were built at Istein; these were destroyed at the end of the war. In 1936 plans were drawn up to turn the location into the "Gibraltar of the West" with two kilometres of underground passages linking gun emplacements and bunkers. The site was to host an underground garage for over 100 tanks, 3600 men and as part of the Siegfried Line it would dwarf similar Maginot Line fortifications. Work began in 1937 and Hermann Göring visited in the spring of 1938. By 1939 several installations were complete but as the war progressed advantageously for the Germans in 1940 the site remained unfinished.

== Communities within Efringen-Kirchen ==
- Blansingen
- Efringen
- Egringen
- Huttingen
- Istein
- Kirchen
- Kleinkems
- Mappach
- Maugenhard
- Welmlingen
- Wintersweiler

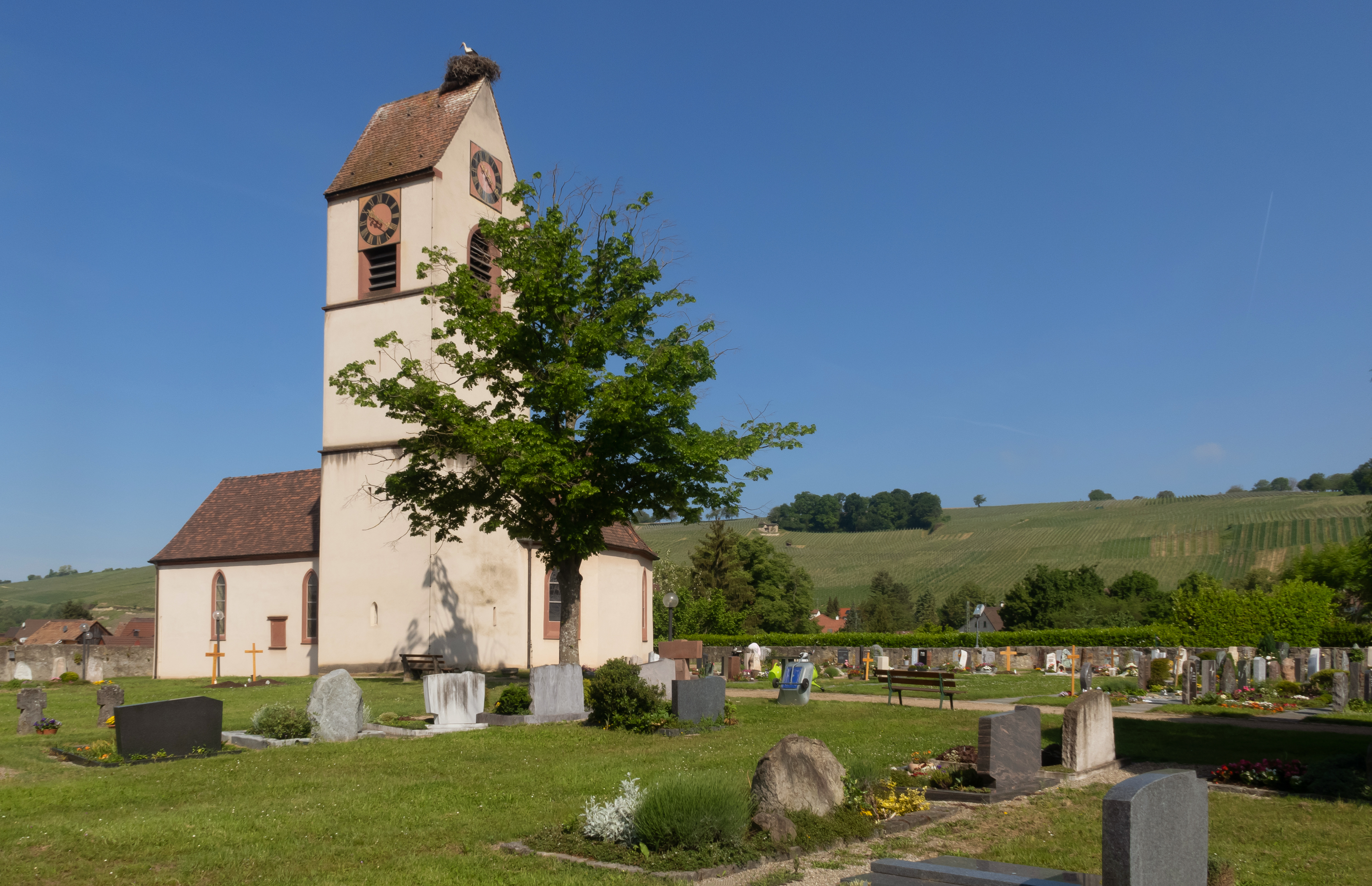
Efringen, reformed church

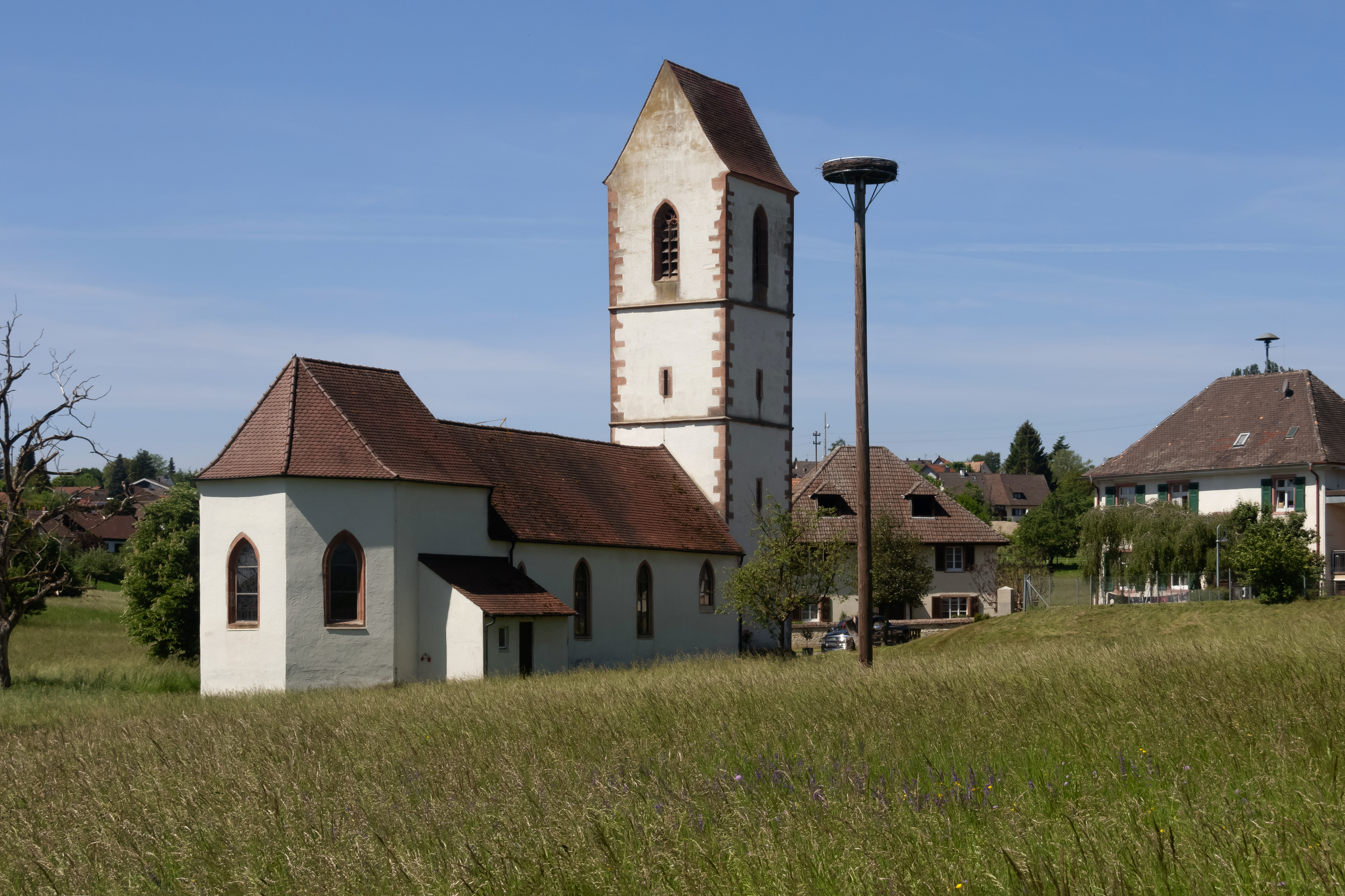
Blansingen, church: the Peterskirche

== Religion ==
=== Churches ===
- Peterskirche, Blansingen
