= Rümmingen =

German municipality in Lörrach, Baden-Württemberg, Germany

- Municipality
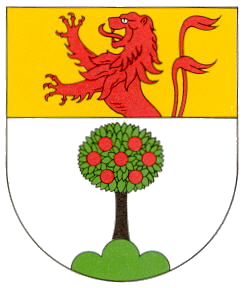
- Coat of arms

- Location of Rümmingen within Lörrach district
- Interactive map of Rümmingen
- Location within Germany Location within Baden-Württemberg
- Coordinates: 47°38′26″N 07°38′36″E
- Country: Germany
- State: Baden-Württemberg
- Admin. region: Freiburg
- District: Lörrach
- Municipal assoc.: Vorderes Kandertal

Government
  - Mayor (2024–32): Joana Carreira (Ind.)

Area
  - Total: 4.46 km^{2} (1.72 sq mi)
- Elevation: 291 m (955 ft)

Population (2025-12-31)
  - Total: 1,895
  - Density: 425/km^{2} (1,100/sq mi)
- Time zone: UTC+01:00 (CET)
  - Summer (DST): UTC+02:00 (CEST)
- Postal codes: 79595
- Dialling codes: 07621
- Vehicle registration: LÖ
- Website: www.ruemmingen.de

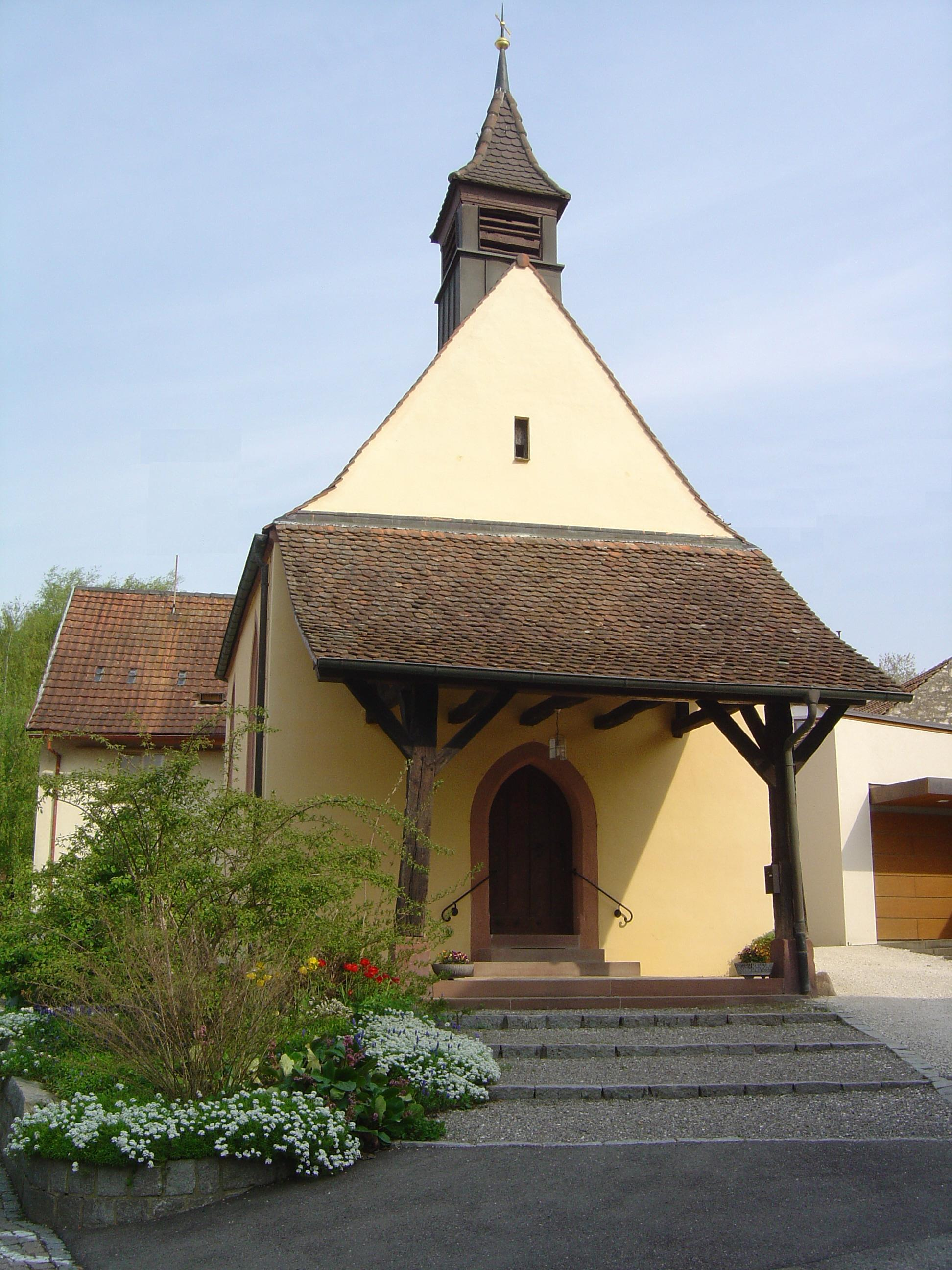
Gothic Chapel in Rümmingen

Rümmingen (German pronunciation: [ˈʁʏmɪŋən]; Alemannic German: Rümmige) is a municipality in the district of Lörrach in Baden-Württemberg in Germany.
