= Grütt Landscape Park =

Green space in Lörrach in Germany

- Grütt park
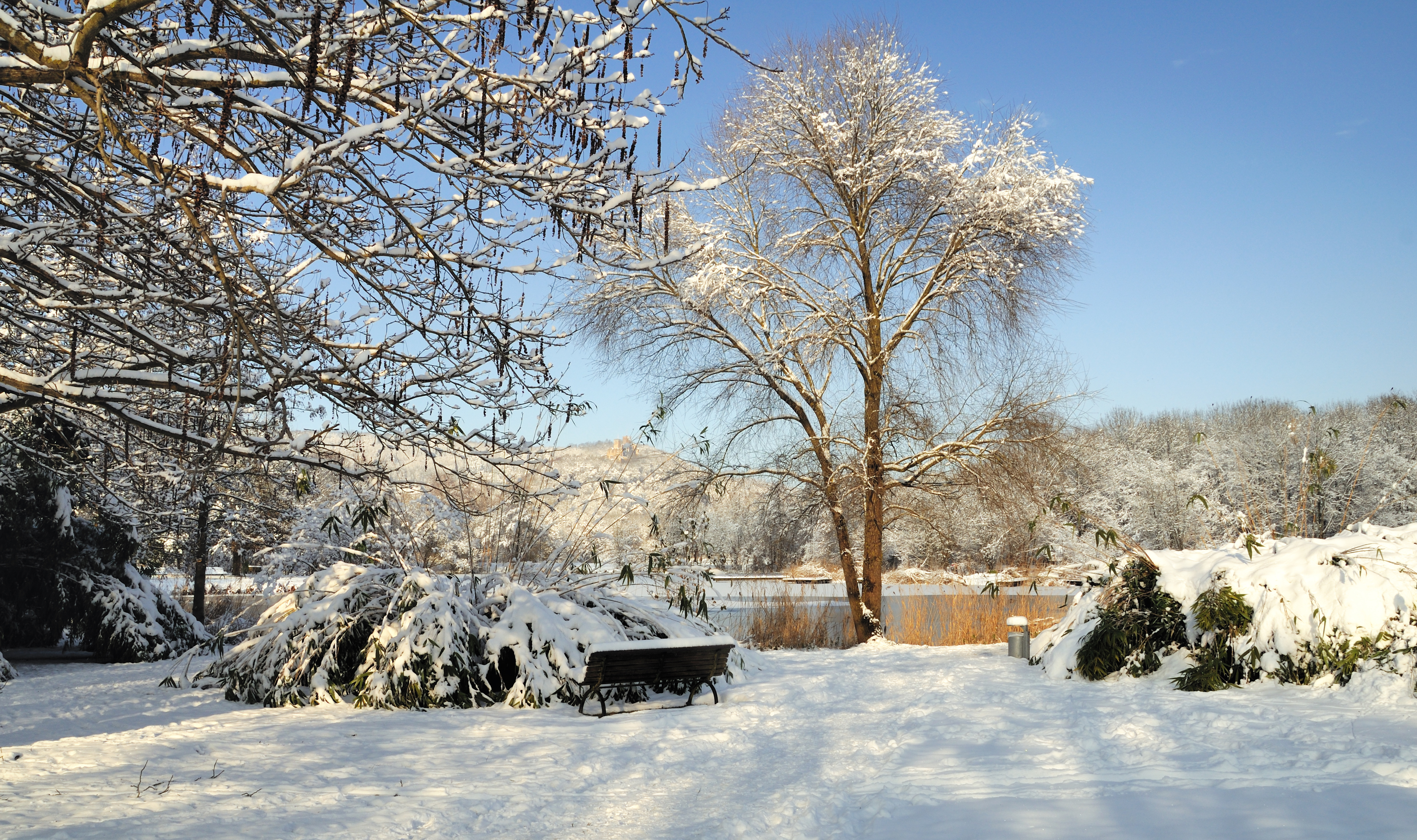
- Grütt park in winter
- Interactive map of Grütt Landscape Park
- Location: Lörrach
- Coordinates: 47.629°N 7.672°E
- Area: 51 hectares (130 acres)
- Open: 1983

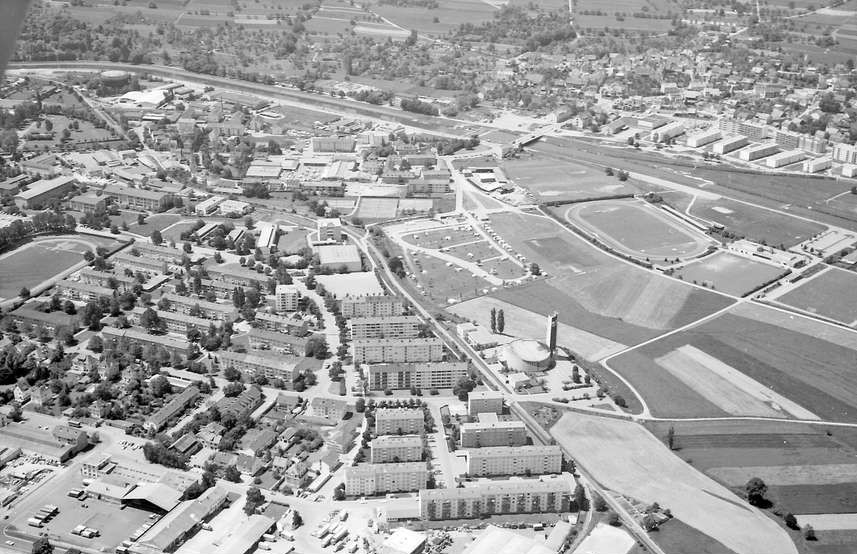
View from the east (1972) of the old stadium, the Grüttpark (on the right), the Grüttpark stadium and the northern part of Lörrach

The Grütt Landscape Park (also Grüttpark) is a 51-hectare green space in Lörrach. In 1983, the Landesgartenschau took place on the newly designed site. The largest park in Lörrach is considered a local recreation area for the town and surrounding area. (→ Green and park areas in Lörrach) At the same time, large parts of the park area are a water conservation area with several deep wells. In total, the area covers around one square kilometer. The near-natural Binnengewässer including their bank vegetation are legally protected biotopes.

The leisure facilities at Grüttpark include playgrounds, sports fields, barbecue facilities, a café and walking and cycling paths. On the edge of the park grounds are exhibition halls, various leisure facilities, the Grüttpark Stadium and other sports facilities. The park is divided into two sections by the Wiesentalbrücke, which is part of the A 98 highway, and a transverse span to the highway, which are connected by a footbridge and a pedestrian and bicycle underpass. The park is the location of several Kunstwerke im öffentlichen Raum.

== History ==
=== Before designing the park ===
Before the parking opening in 1983, the Grütt was part of an area with only a few accessible paths Floodplain landscape. The name Grütt is derived from the word rütten, which means to clear. The river lowlands and the alluvial forest in this gain had been cut down in earlier times, the Wiese with a multitude of tributaries meandered through the area. After the river straightening in the years 1806 to 1823 by the Baden hydraulic engineer Johann Gottfried Tulla, meadows and predominantly agricultural fields were created in the floodplain, with the loss of a rich biodiversity.

From November 1920 to July 1921, the Lörrach airfield with passenger and mail traffic was located on the edge of today's Grüttpark. Due to a directive resulting from the Peace Treaty of Versailles, it was closed down. The orphaned airfield was last used on March 24, 1954, for a flight day. The site has since been completely built over. On January 7, 1925, a plane crash occurred at the Lörrach airfield in which the pilot died. A memorial on the north-western edge of Grüttpark commemorates the accident and the airfield. It was inaugurated on October 10, 1988, by the then Minister of Defense Manfred Wörner.

The area between Brombach and the city center of Lörrach has been used for the municipal water supply since 1967. The first deep well in Grütt was put into operation in 1968 after extensive water pipeline construction work had been carried out in advance. In the following years, the supply with deep wells was expanded in stages and thus a fundamental decision was made for the city's water supply and the supply network was further expanded.

After 1960, the southern part of Grütts began to develop into a sports ground. As the tennis club had to make way for the swimming pool extension, new tennis facilities were built on Arndtstraße in 1961. A year later, the shooting club also moved to Grütt, as the old site on Hünerberg has to make way for the new housing development. However, the move of the TSV Rot-Weiss Lörrach, whose sports fields were previously located on Brombacher Straße, approximately at the junction with Schwarzwald Straße, was decisive. Also due to the space requirements of the growing town, the sports club received a generously designed stadium area with a running track, grandstand, restaurant, gymnastics hall and sanitary facilities. On November 5, 1966, the Grüttpark-Stadion was opened, which at the time was still called the Rot-Weiß-Stadion. This was the first time that the modern stadium also met competition requirements.

=== Application for the State Garden Show ===
On September 29, 1978, the then Lord Mayor Egon Hugenschmidt gave three reasons for Lörrach's candidacy for the State Garden Show:

Firstly, the permanent designation of the approximately 100-hectare site as a green area was intended to create a compensatory measure for the A 98 and the new B 317. The adverse effects on the landscape in Lörrach could thus be compensated for. Secondly, a cross-border green space along the river Wiese and the Langen Erlen in Riehen and Basel created a link to the neighboring state. Thirdly, due to the special location in the border triangle France-Switzerland-Germany, the opportunity to present itself.

The 300th anniversary of the granting of the city charter in 1682/83 would have been a suitable date for the state garden show. Together with external consultants and water management representatives, the urban planning department formulated the objectives for the competition area, which also serves as an important water catchment area for the city. For example, the isolation of the watercourses, such as ponds and streams, and the positioning of the buildings would be important. As a local recreation park, the northern districts Brombach, Haagen, Hauingen and Tumringen were to be connected to the southern core of the city and the existing deficit of green spaces was to be reduced. On March 27, 1979, six months after the application, Baden-Württemberg awarded the contract to Lörrach over 30 competitors.

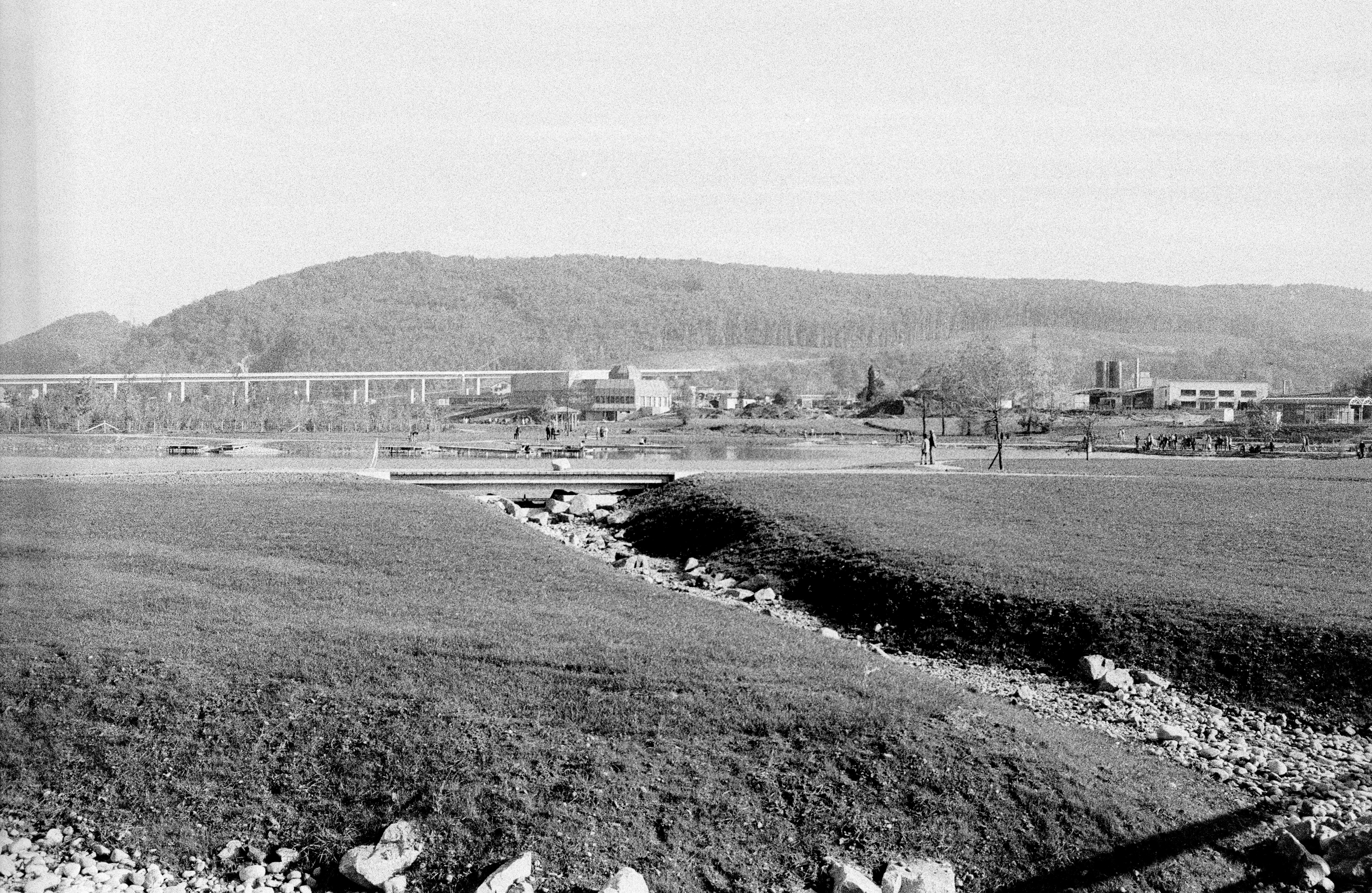
Grüttpark 1982 before the opening of the State Garden Show

=== Competition, planning and construction ===
Following the successful application, the state and the city announced an open ideas and realization competition for the garden show on 22 August 1979. Of the 15 entries submitted, three had to be rejected due to deficiencies, leaving the jury with twelve entries to judge. Under the chairmanship of garden and landscape architect Horst Wagenfeld from Düsseldorf, the first three prize winners were awarded on January 18 and 19, 1980. The first prize went to Bernd Meier, landscape architect from Freiburg im Breisgau, E. Riedel, landscape architect from Lahr, Manfred Morlock, architect from Schallstadt and Hubertus Bühler, architect from Freiburg.

The city council factions of the CDU, SPD and Freien Wähler supported the project from the outset. The Greens and an interest group of Conservationists and committed citizens criticized that the concept was too park-like and did not meet the requirements for a water protection area. Furthermore, the use by agriculture and horticultural plantings would result in additional fertilizer use. In addition, the transportation structures associated with the State Garden Show made the project seem implausible from a nature conservation perspective.

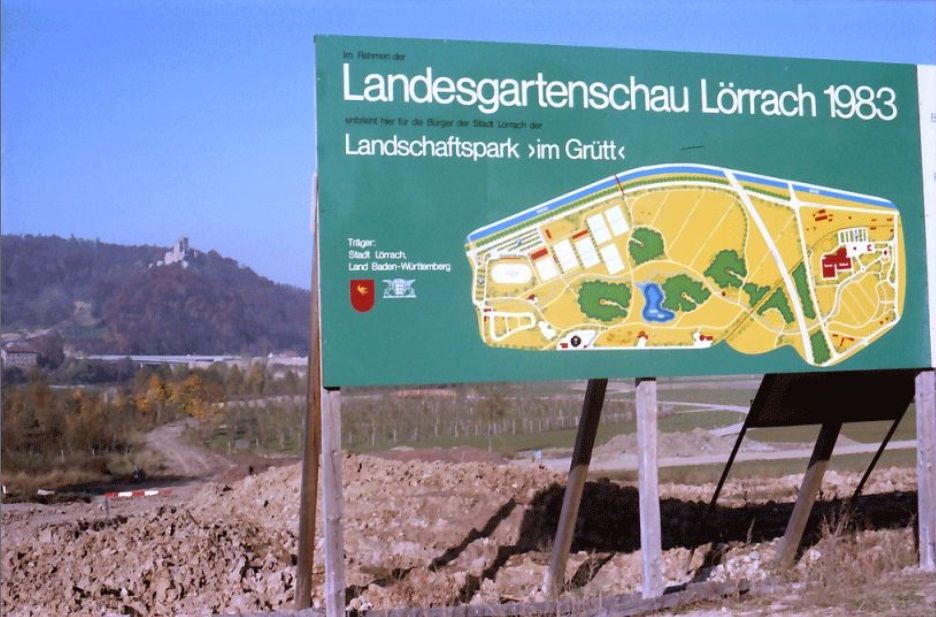
Sign for the 1983 State Garden Show

A journalist from outside the town was chosen for the advertising and public relations work. In retrospect, the failure to advertise with the coach companies was seen as a serious omission, which meant that few visitors found their way to Lörrach via travel companies. There was a complete failure to arrange press work in neighboring Switzerland in good time. This turned out to be a mistake. The engagement with the journalist was terminated and two local journalists were entrusted with the task on a part-time basis.

In August 1982, a jury of experts selected the logo by Basel graphic designer Francis Rusterholz for the National Garden Show. It consists of three interlocking graphic elements in shades of blue and green. On the left it bears the blue letter "L", in the middle a stylized arch in dark green represents Lörrach's geographical proximity to the Rheinknie, on the top right a light green leaf symbolizes the park and nature. The signet was used on all posters, banderoles, stickers and other advertising media; it was also the logo of the newly founded Landesgartenschau Lörrach 1983 GmbH.

On September 2, 1981, the groundbreaking ceremony took place at the Landesgartenschau site. Mayor Hugenschmidt and Mayor Edmund Henkel drove a crawler vehicle on this day as a symbolic start to the construction work. In December of that year, the excavation work for the Grüttsee and the course of the stream was completed. The fallow land, which had previously mostly been used for agriculture, was renaturalized and a system of paths was created for walkers. The trees donated by the local population were planted on March 20, 1982, Arbor Day by committed citizens.

=== State Garden Show 1983 ===
==== Opening and general data ====
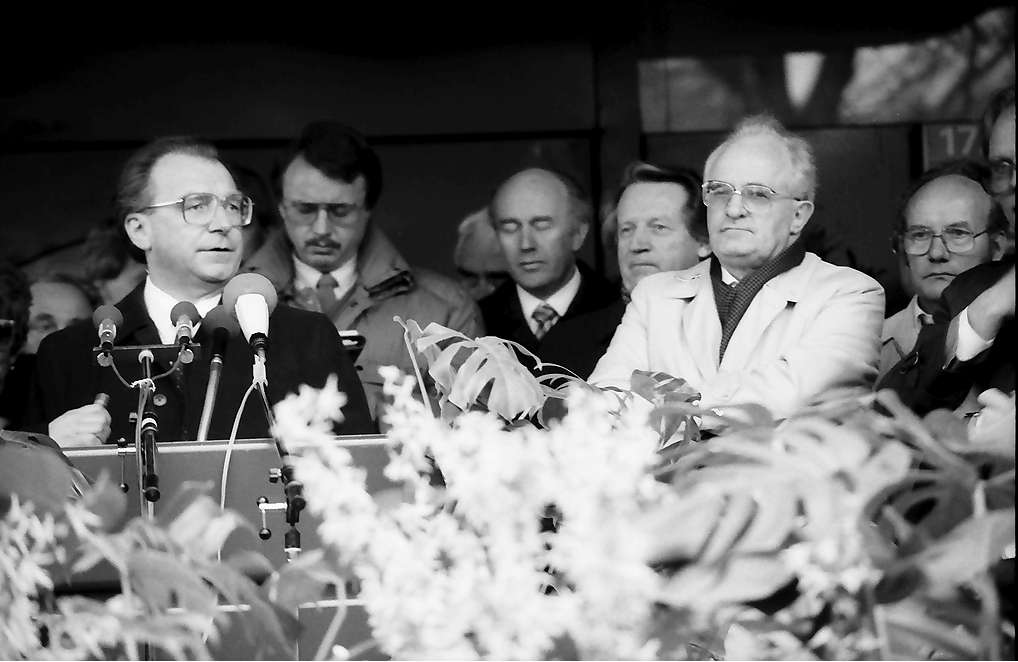
Lothar Späth (left) and Egon Hugenschmidt at Lörrach town hall during the opening ceremony

On April 15, 1983, on the occasion of the 300th anniversary of the town's charter, the State Garden Show was ceremoniously opened in the presence of the then Minister President Lothar Späth and the Lord Mayor Hugenschmidt. The Deutsche Bundesbahn had a special train (Gartenschau-Kurier) run from Karlsruhe to the station in Lörrach-Haagen to the exhibition grounds especially for the opening. After a ceremony at Lörrach Town Hall, the VIPs boarded this special train at Lörrach Central Station together with a delegation in traditional costume and were driven to the garden show grounds. A curiosity was that the high-ranking political guest Späth cut the obligatory ribbon at the opening ceremony on the garden show grounds, but did not visit the garden show at all. He flew back to Stuttgart and promised to visit the garden show at a later date. Späth is said to have traveled to Lörrach very late a few weeks later, so that he was once again unable to take a stroll through the exhibition, but that was as far as it went.

The State Garden Show lasted until October 16, 1983, and attracted 1,045,000 visitors. This figure was around 400,000 visitors short of expectations. The horticultural show began with heavy continuous rain, followed by an unusual heat wave. Apart from the weather, inept advertising and a misjudgement of the Swiss public are blamed for the shortfall in visitor numbers.

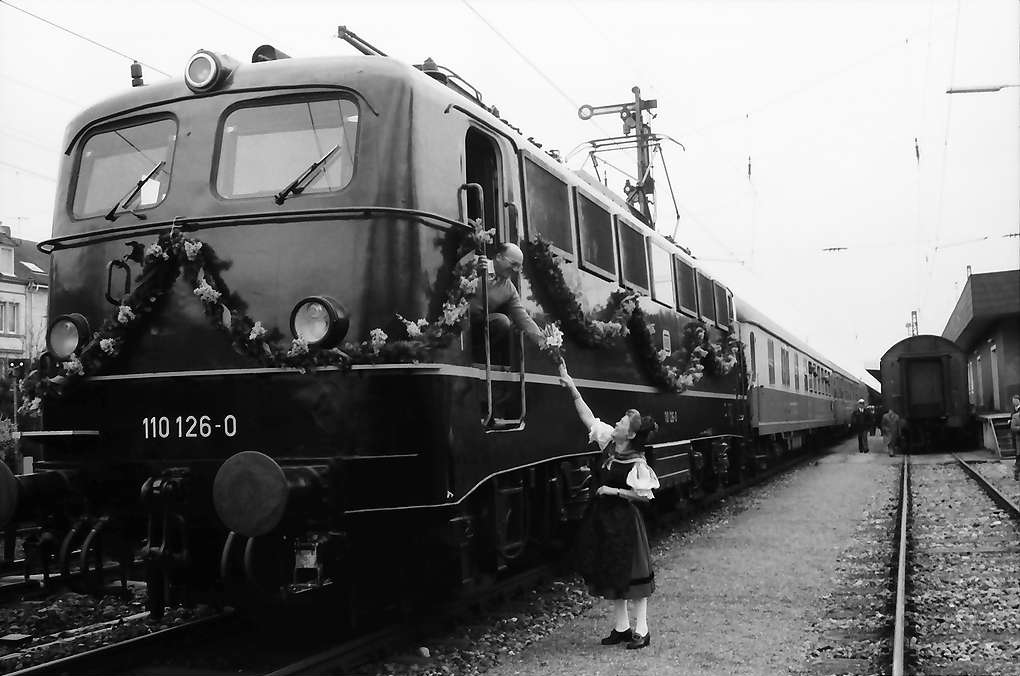
Decorated special train Garden Show Courier

The motto of the garden show was the Alemannic "Chumm go luege" - "Come, look at it"; presented by the goose "Lörli" as mascot. The design of the green spaces can be traced back to the town planning director Klaus Stein, among others.

In addition to the Gartenschau-Kurier, the Blütenexpress was the second special train that ran from Heidelberg or Offenburg to Lörrach and back during the State Garden Show. The names of the two special trains were determined by a competition organized by Landesgartenschau GmbH.

The German Federal Post Office issued a large circular postmark on April 15 to mark the start of the event, drawing attention to the State Garden Show on first day covers. At the same time, four special garden show postcards and two historical postcards with motifs of Lörrach at the turn of the century were also issued.

==== Infrastructure ====
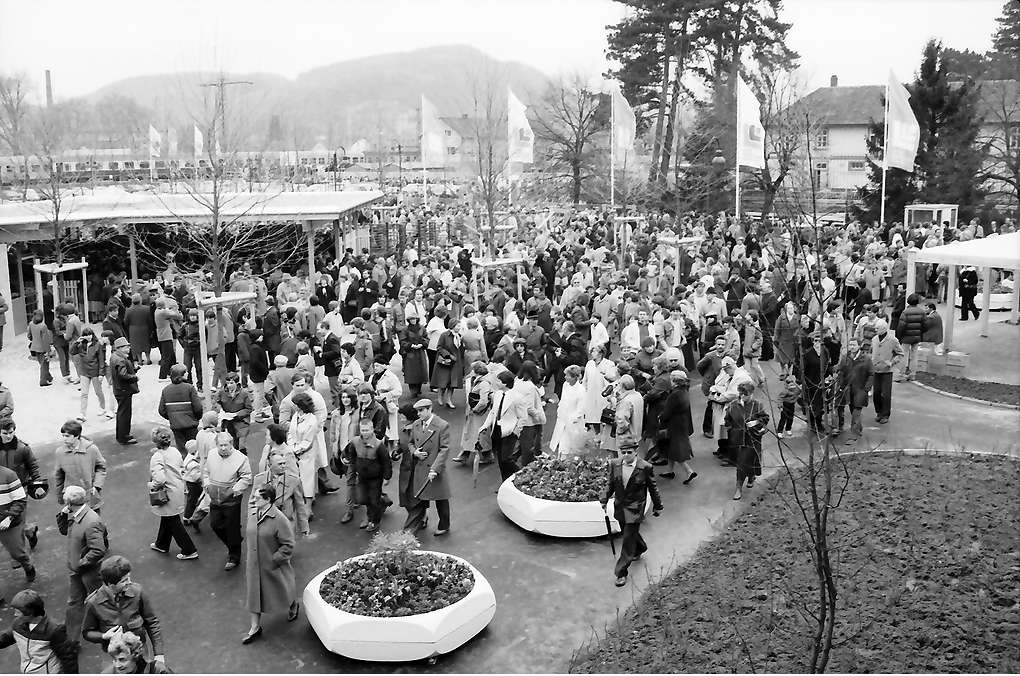
Flow of visitors at the main entrance

At the State Garden Show in Lörrach, only the eastern section was fenced off and subject to a charge. The main entrance was in the northeast, at today's sports and leisure center. At the western entrance (the "Grütt" entrance), to the east of the waterworks, there is now a meadow.

In addition to the possibility of coming to the Landesgartenschau by train, the LGS organization provided around 1600 car and 40 coach parking spaces on the site.

There were eight restaurants in the park area, five of which were enclosed. A total of 1000 covered and 600 outdoor seats were available to visitors.

An electrically operated, rubber-tired exhibition railroad from the manufacturer Intamin connected the main entrance with the western edge of Grüttpark, around 3.5 kilometers away. The underpass at the "Grütt" entrance was originally too steep for the exhibition railroad, so it had to be flattened.

A temporary building at the main entrance served as an information and press office. In addition to telephones, there was a letterbox, a dog storage facility, wheelchair rental and toilets. Eight toilet blocks were scattered around the site. One disabled toilet was located at the main entrance. Emergency services, paramedics, security and police were also stationed there. Twelve workers were assigned to a crew leader to maintain the gardens. After the end of the Landesgartenschau, eight of these workers remained with the municipal horticultural department as gardeners.

==== Exhibitions and campaigns ====
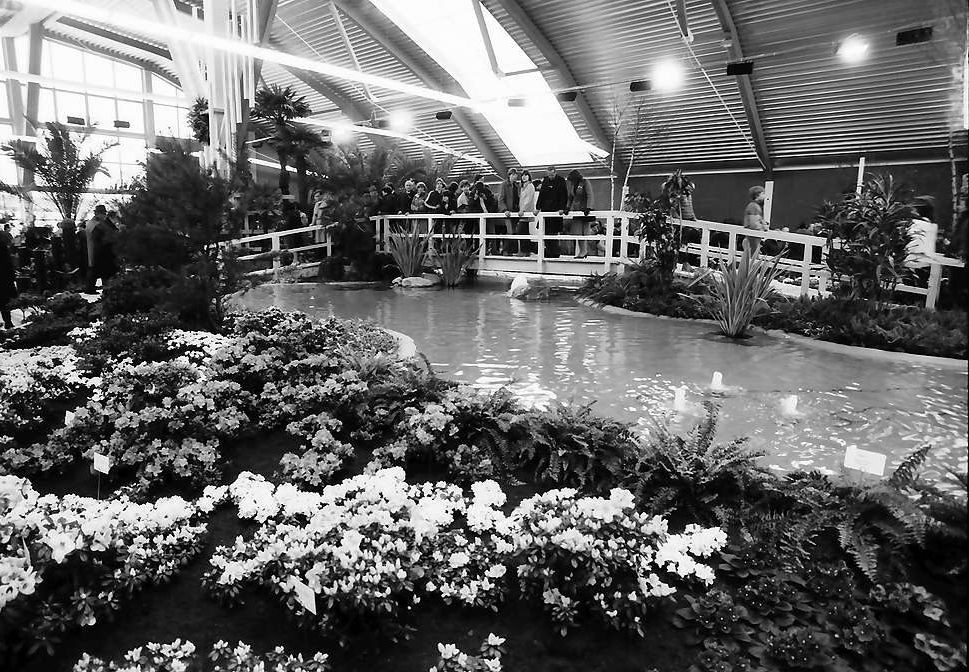
Flower hall on opening day

In the north-eastern part of the garden show grounds, the Bund für Umwelt und Naturschutz Deutschland (BUND) created a biotope. The indoor shows and events on various topics took place there on 2000 square meters. In addition to a permanent program, 26 special horticultural shows were held every two weeks. The "Treffpunkt Baden-Württemberg" focused on horticultural exhibition themes, including Ikebana: Ikebana and Bonsai, berry and cherry variety show, Floral Objects and Textile Pictures - Floral Objects. Other exhibitions included land consolidation and its benefits, biotope protection, landscape policy, human protection from water, flood protection and the presentation of the BUND nature conservation campaign Save the frogs.

The design concept of the park attempted to create a landscape connection with the surrounding area. There was a series of exhibitions on the subject of "Water in the new waterworks" in the "Baden-Württemberg meeting point" and in the ice rink. The topic of agriculture and forestry was addressed with a nature trail. The farmers whose fields (around 20 hectares) had been leased during the garden show planted the areas with maize, rape, cereals, clover and summer flowers. The topic of viticulture was represented by a recreated historical vineyard and a modern vineyard. Old and new grape varieties, cultivation methods and yields from the past and present were compared.

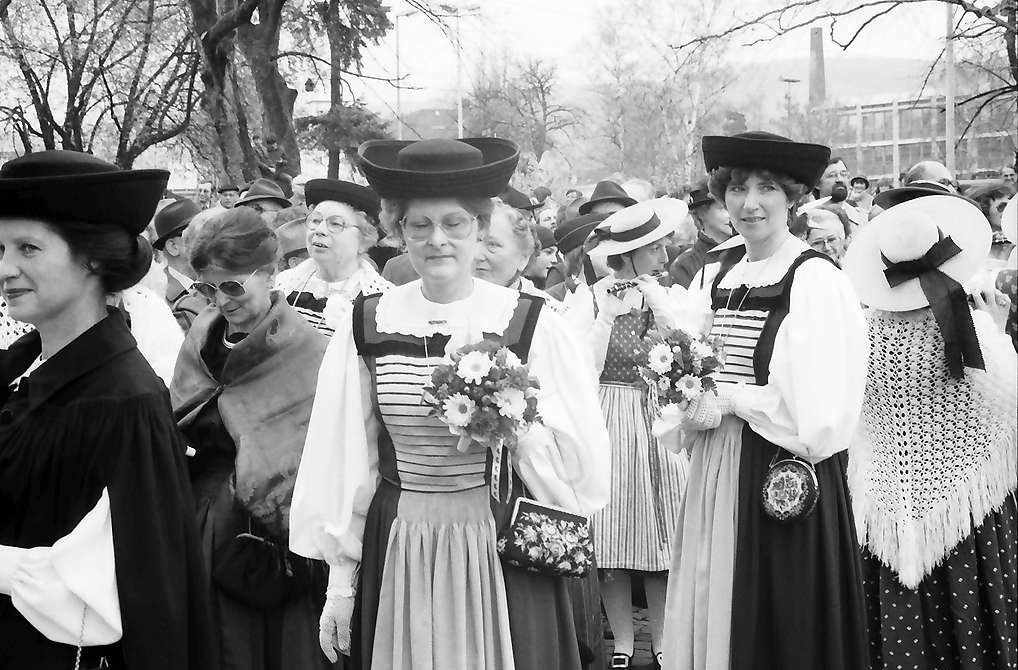
Traditional costume parade at the State Garden Show

In addition to a series of Sculptures and other art installations, there was an action weekend Young artists introduce themselves and the contribution "Arts and crafts in Baden-Württemberg" as well as art exhibitions in the Villa Fehr and at Burg Rötteln on the subject of art.

The State Garden Show also covered other topics in a series of exhibitions, including: Solidarity with the Third World, Healthy and fit in old age, Stay healthy - become active, The museums of the region introduce themselves, two action weekends of the Countrywomen, Federal Association for Self-Protection, Traditional costume dolls for the district costume festival and the Pupil competition of the state parliament of Baden-Württemberg "Mach' mit".

==== Events and programs ====
There were various events and information for both lay and professional visitors. On Thursdays, the "Baden-Württemberg Meeting Point" offered lay visitors weekly changing lectures, films, slide (photography) shows on the topics of gardening, fruit and vegetable growing, pest control and nature conservation such as floristry. For the specialist public, there was a fenced exhibition area in the center at the gardener information point for professional exchange. In addition, several horticultural conferences were held in Lörrach during the garden show year.

Special activities for children and young people were held on Wednesdays. In addition to an afternoon of games on the playground at the "Treffpunkt Baden-Württemberg" and "Grütt-Treff", there were roller skating discos in the ice rink, youth afternoons, children's parties, fairy tale afternoons, puppet shows, vacation programs and a children's circus.

In addition to the activities and programs directly on the garden show grounds, other institutions also took advantage of the increased number of visitors for special events. For example, an Oldtimer car Rallye took place from May 6 to 8, 1983. The Landesbausparkasse organized a multi-day bicycle race for amateurs from 11 to 17 June, which ran from Mannheim to Lörrach. The final stage from Bonndorf to Lörrach ended at the sports facilities in Grütt. The award ceremony was held at the Landesgartenschau grounds. In addition, the Baden Gardeners' Day took place on June 28 and 29 and the Landesgymnaestrada gymnastics festival was held from September 16 to 18.

On July 20, 1983, the 500,000th visitor to the Lörrach State Garden Show was honored.

==== Costs and conclusion ====
Not all of the required areas were owned by the city; parts were leased for the duration of the event. The costs for this amounted to DM 7.4 million. One external development measure was the construction of a temporary platform at Haagen station. The investment budget was handled within the city's capital budget. Together with the state subsidy of 5 million DM, the total costs amounted to 17,569,518 DM (equivalent to today's purchasing power of 17811500 Euro). Costs for accompanying construction measures amounted to a good DM 8 million. The costs can be roughly broken down into three main items:

Structures, including meadow footbridges	3.043.740 DM
Landscaping, horticultural plants, plants	12.328.789 DM
Incidental building costs	2.196.989 DM
	17.569.518 DM

This was offset by income from ticket sales of DM 2,855,185 and from rent, commissions and donations of DM 1,887,061. The shortfall to be borne by the city of Lörrach amounted to around DM 5.3 million.

In addition to 25,000 season tickets, 350,000 individual tickets and 450,000 special tickets were sold. The regular admission price was 7.50 DM, children aged 6 to 14 had to pay 3 DM, and a family ticket cost 17 DM. From 5:30 p.m. onwards, the evening price was reduced by a good half.

The verdict on the State Garden Show was consistently positive. The park is useful for the people of Lörrach, according to the trade magazine Heim + Garten, and described the Landesgartenschau's offer in a multi-page article. With regard to the cost issue, the newspaper came to the conclusion that the funds for securing the greenery on the highway bridge would have had to be used anyway. The additional expenditure was justified solely by the permanent greenery created. Despite the lack of a record number of visitors, the trade journal Deutscher Gartenbau stated in its August 1983 issue that the participants deserved high praise. It was a progressive solution not to have designed the entire site as an exhibition park in the planning and the separation of the exhibition section from the landscape park was also successful. For a town like Lörrach, which has no overall green planning concept, the creation of this landscape park is a remarkable achievement that would not have been possible in this form without the garden show. The garden subscription magazine Mein schöner Garten called the State Garden Show in Lörrach the "little sister of the IGA", which took place in Munich in the same year. As benevolent and laudatory as the trade press was about the event in the long-term context, the local press was critical of the immediate financial impact of the garden show. The Oberbadische Volksblatt denounced that the calculated deficit had almost doubled and that the figures should be withheld from the public. A "clearance sale" of inventory used during the garden show was probably intended to limit the disaster. The last day of the Landesgartenschau was October 17, 1983.

=== After the end of the Landesgartenschau ===
After the end of the garden show, the exhibition area in the east was converted into a public park on October 1, 1983. The meadows of the park were left partially natural as a water protection and water catchment area. As the municipal youth associations rejected the "Grütt youth club", it was converted into a municipal kindergarten (currently: Waldorf kindergarten).

The SV Weil and FV Lörrach-Brombach have been organizing an international youth soccer tournament since 1972. The age groups of the U10 to U14 juniors play both in the hall and on the field. In addition to the sports hall of the Markgrafenschule in Weil am Rhein, most of the games take place in the Wintersbuckhalle adjacent to the Grütt to the south and on the artificial turf pitches at the Grüttpark stadium. Participants in the traditional soccer tournament include Young teams from FC Barcelona, Juventus Turin, Chelsea FC, Bayern Munich, Borussia Dortmund and FC Basel. The sponsorship of the sporting event has been taken over by a real estate company from Lörrach for several years.

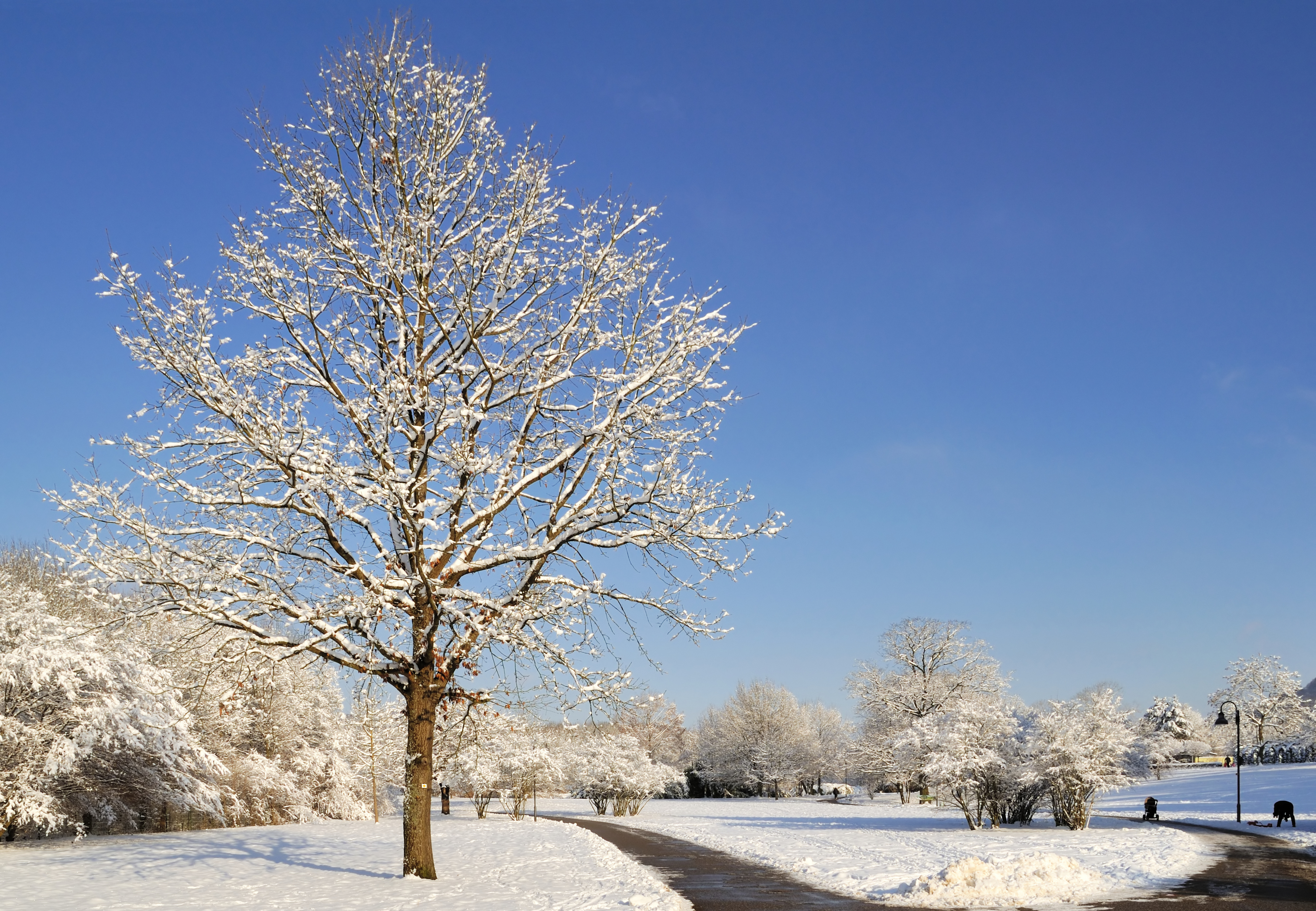
Grüttpark in winter 2010

From 2005 to 2015, the regional metal open-air concert Baden in Blut took place on the green spaces in the northern part. As the number of visitors has risen steadily in recent years and pollution has increased, the city of Lörrach no longer permitted the festival in the water protection area. The "Day of the Horse" has been a riding show organized by the riding club since 1925. It was originally a horse market and took place at various locations in Lörrach. It was held in Grüttpark until 2013. With several thousand visitors, it has a kind of folk festival character.

Since 1997, the TuS Lörrach-Stetten has been organizing the "Grüttlauf" in Grüttpark with an 800-metre course for small children and a ten and five-kilometre main run. The start and finish is the Grüttpark Stadium. Around 500 runners took part in the event in 2019.

On June 17, 2023, an action day was held to mark the 40th anniversary of Grüttpark, at which sports clubs and Lörrach institutions presented themselves. In addition to the events, free guided tours were also offered.

== Description and use ==
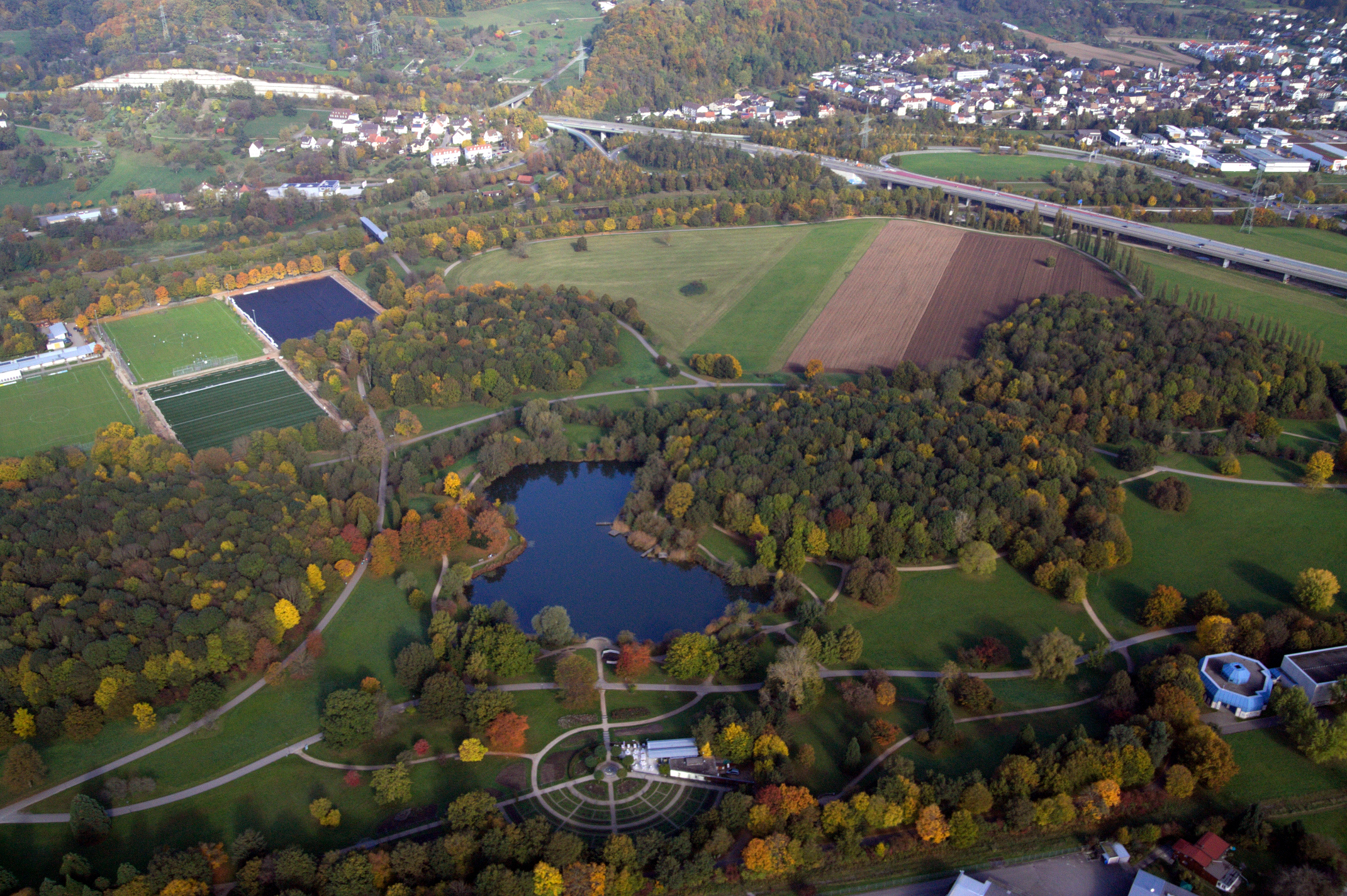
Aerial view of the central part of the park with the rose garden, the Grüttsee lake and the Tiefenbrunnen protection forests. On the far right of the picture is the waterworks

The landscape park in the northern part of Lörrach's town center serves as a local recreation area today. In addition to paths for walkers and cyclists, a nature trail with ten stations leads through the park. A section of the Hebel-Wanderweg also runs through the Grüttpark; one station is located on the southern shore of the artificial Grüttsee lake. The partly asphalted and partly gravel path network in the park covers over ten kilometers.

The park is flat, with virtually no natural or artificial hills. Most of the park lies at an altitude of 300, the Grüttsee has an altitude of 294. Only at the edges do some paths lead in gentle ramps to the park area, which is somewhat lower compared to the urban area. The 51-hectare park is divided into the following areas:

Lawns and planting areas	42 ha
Water surfaces	2 ha
Paths and squares	5,5 ha
Building areas	1,5 ha

On the eastern edge of the Grüttpark is an allotment garden site with an area of around 8000 square meters. The plots are leased to an association. The management of the huts with electricity and water connection is the responsibility of the town.

=== Facilities and buildings ===
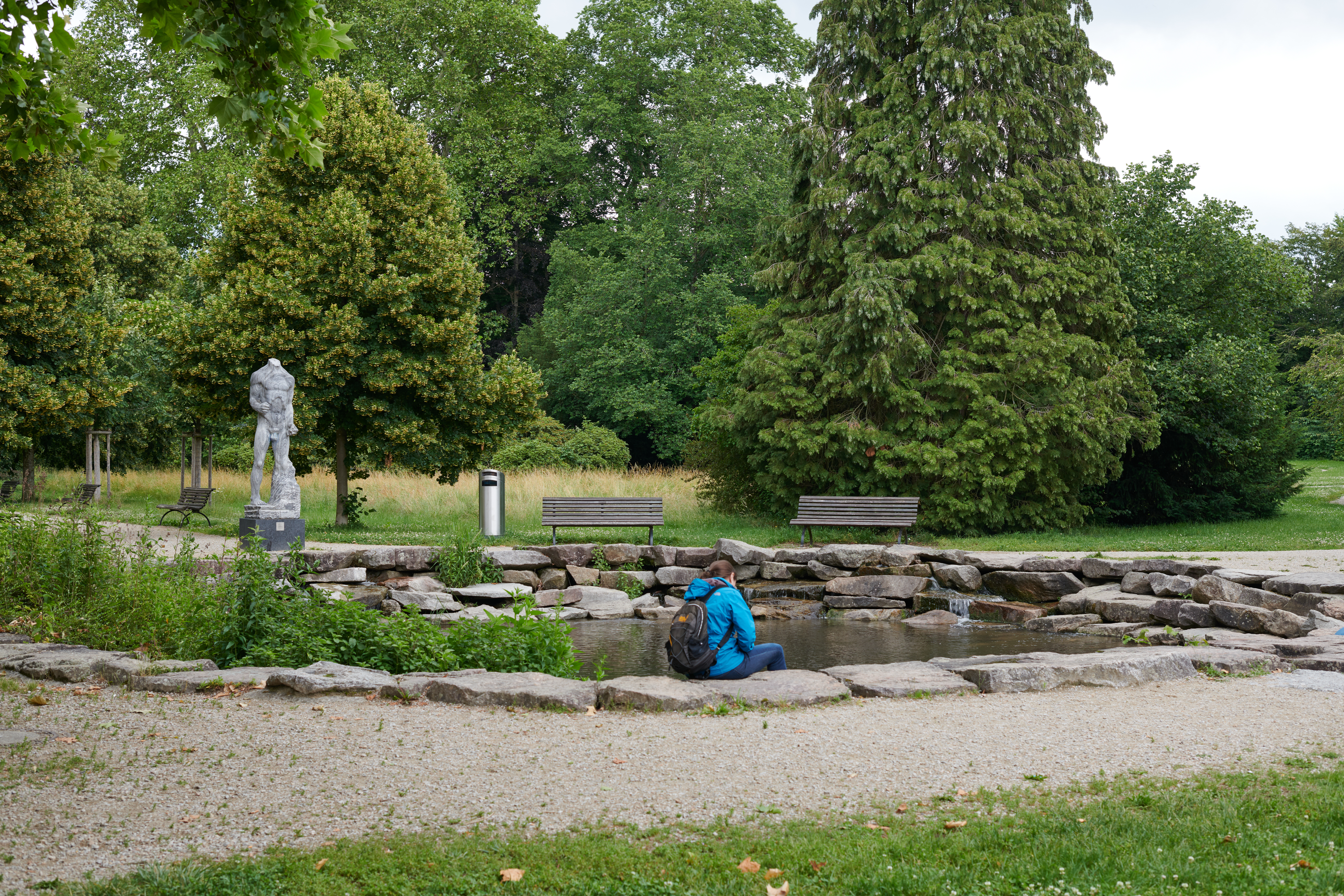
Spring pot

The Grüttbach flows through the park and the Grüttsee. Both bodies of water were created artificially. The Grüttbach springs from an artificial, accessible spring trough. The stream flows almost through the entire park from north-east to south-west. Small footbridges and bridges cross it. There are four shelters designed as pavilions in the park. A Kneipp facility along the course of the stream was installed in 1982/83 as an accompanying measure for the garden show.

At the western end is a campsite established in 1970 with caravan sites, tennis courts and soccer pitches. The Grüttpark Stadium, built between 1964 and 1966, is also located there. There is a restaurant near the main entrance to the stadium.

The St. Peter's Church is located in the southern area next to an adventure playground. The modern church with its 42-metre-high bell tower stands somewhat exposed and is visible from almost the entire park. The kindergarten to the west of the church belongs to the Catholic parish. Near the Grüttparkstadion is a Waldorf kindergarten, which was rebuilt from 2020 to 2022. To the east of the church is a Rosengarten; next to it is a café.

Other small children's playgrounds are located in the eastern part of the park. With a rope raft for children just 50 meters south of the spring pot, you can use your own muscle power to pull yourself across the Grüttbach to the opposite bank.

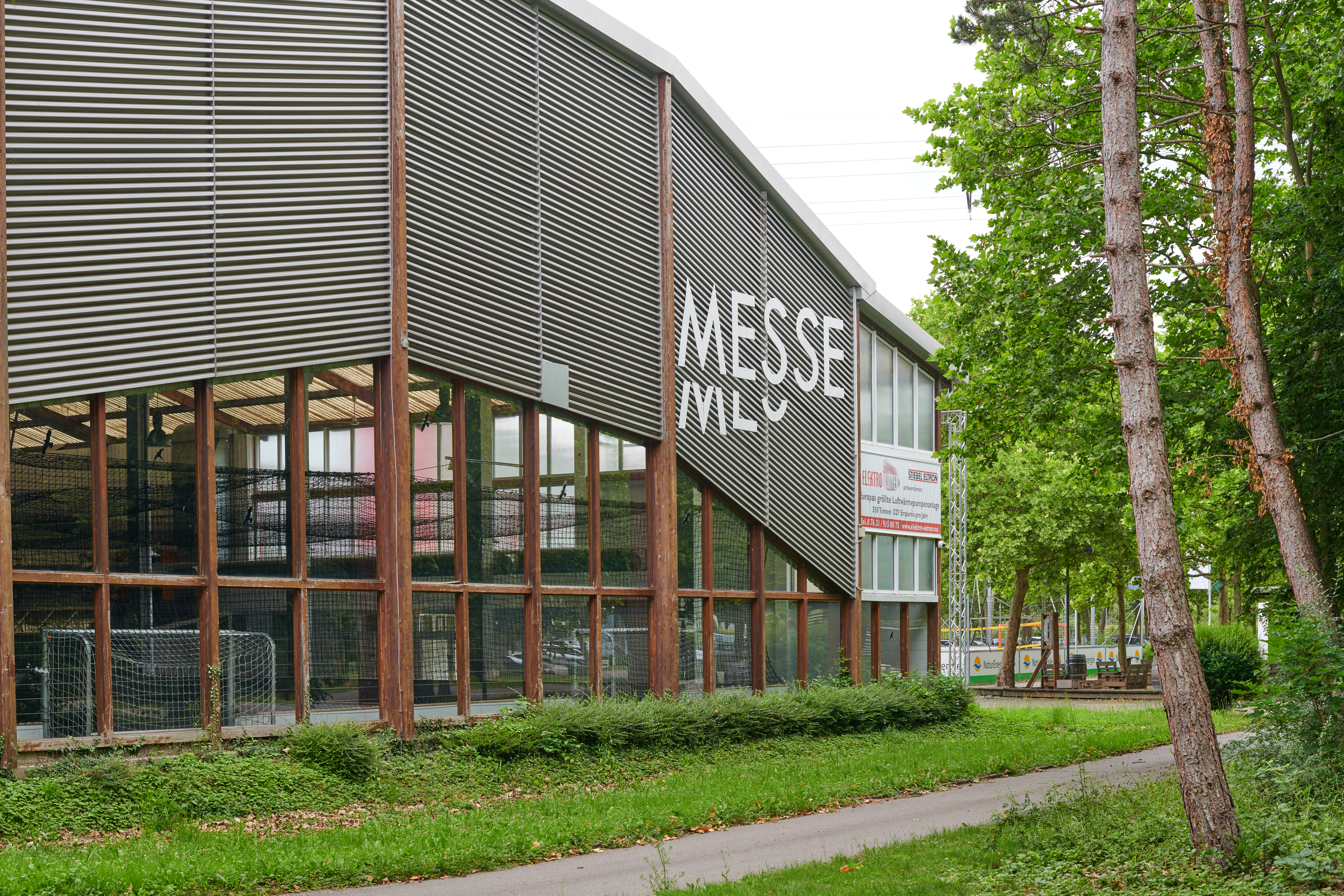
Exhibition halls

Three power lines run through the Grütt Landscape Park, some of which are part of the supra-regional Stromtrassen. The tall overhead line pylons are located in the eastern part of the park above the Wiesental valley.

The largest building complex at Grüttpark is the sports and leisure center and the exhibition halls on the north-eastern edge of the site. In addition to a hotel, there are several sports halls that enable the indoor practice of tennis, badminton, squash, soccer, bowling and skittles. In the outdoor area there are facilities for beach soccer and beach volleyball. The building also houses a Taekwon-Do school and a fitness studio. To the north-west of the leisure and exhibition center is the Villa Feer, built in 1900 on the park grounds. It was privately owned until 1983 and was converted into a restaurant by the town of Lörrach for the State Garden Show. The house has no longer been owned by the town since 2005, but is still used as a restaurant. The clubhouse of the Jazzclub Lörrach with the club pub Jazztone is housed in an outbuilding of the villa - the former farm wing. During its 60-year existence, internationally renowned jazz artists have performed here. The jazz club was also established in the course of the 1983 State Garden Show.

In 1984, one year after the State Garden Show, the first REGIO trade fair was held on the exhibition grounds in Grütt, at that time with five halls. The fair now has three permanent halls, which can be extended by temporary tent halls if required. The REGIO trade fair is the largest trade fair in Lörrach. It has an exhibition area of 29,000 square meters and is attended by over 400 exhibitors. The exhibition halls are located in the immediate vicinity of the sports and leisure center. The fairground adjoining the halls to the north is used for circus guest performances or other open-air events outside of trade fairs.

=== Grüttsee and Grüttsbach ===
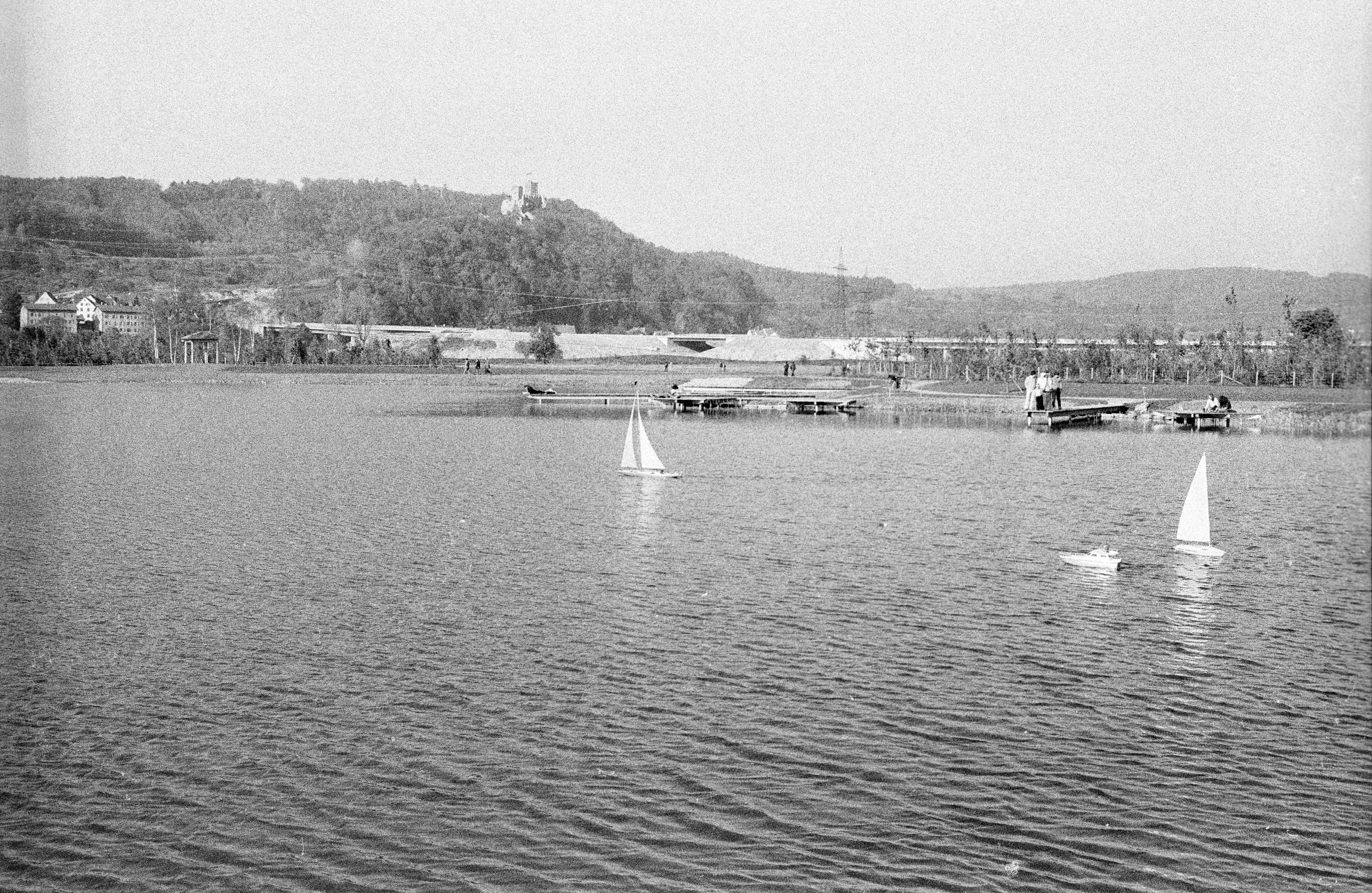
Grüttsee 1982: with still very sparse shore vegetation

The water system of the Grütts is fed by the Heilisau springs, among others. The springs at an altitude of around 340 meters are around 50 meters higher than the park and are fed into the park from the underground streams to the north and discharged again to the south. The Grüttbach, which flows from north to south and is around 2 kilometers long, emerges from an

In the middle of the park is Lake Grüttsee, which is around 12,000 square meters in size and only a few meters deep. Its lake level is at 294 height. Originally, a second, approximately 3100 square meter lake ("model boat lake") was planned for the State Garden Show so that the Grüttsee would not be disturbed by leisure activities. For ecological reasons, this second shallow lake was later omitted from the planning. According to the environmental protection ordinance, swimming, boating, surfing, fishing, the use of model boats, ice skating and walking on ice is prohibited in Lake Grüttsee.

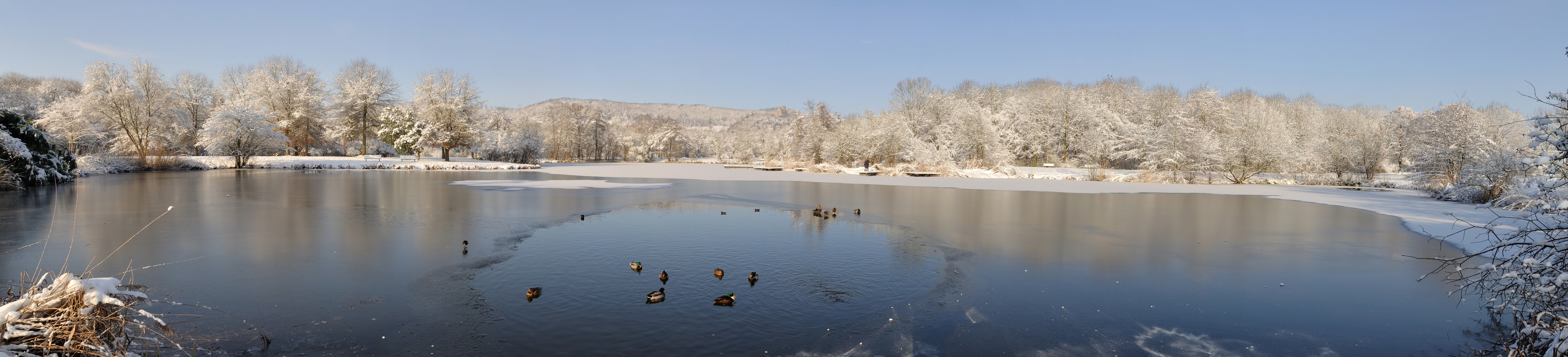
Lake Grüttsee in winter with a view of Rötteln Castle (2010)

The Grüttsee reached its maximum level after about 27 days of supply at the beginning of September 1982.

=== Rosarium ===
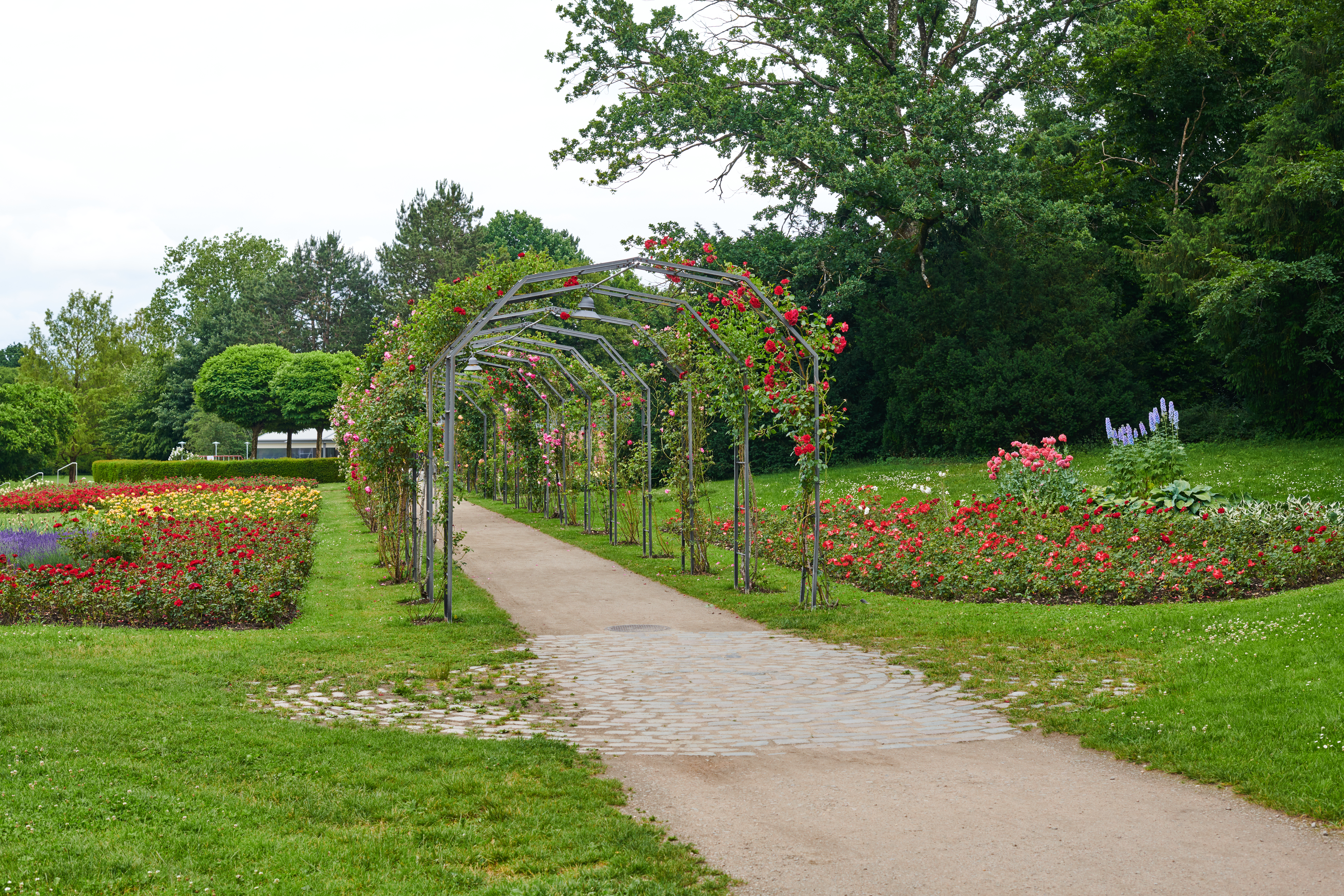
View of the rose garden

South of the Grüttsee lake, on the edge of a low terrace, lies the Rosengarten, which covers around 1 hectare and was designated as a site on the basis of the municipal conservation order. The Rosarium contains around 2,500 rose bushes of 170 species and varieties, creating various formations. Around 7500 roses of 30 species have been planted on the slope towards the lake. The different classes of roses are served by different climbing supports and scaffolding. The main walkway under a rose arch leads to the rose garden café. The beds are square, rectangular and round. In the center of the rose garden is a fountain by the Freiburg artist Bollin. The square is surrounded by ten spherical acacias. From there, star-shaped paths lead to the semi-circular flowerbeds. The beds, which display a variety of colors and shapes in summer, are separated by green lawns. The rose garden is bordered by yews, oaks, hornbeams and Japanese ornamental cherries towards the residential buildings.

=== Flora ===
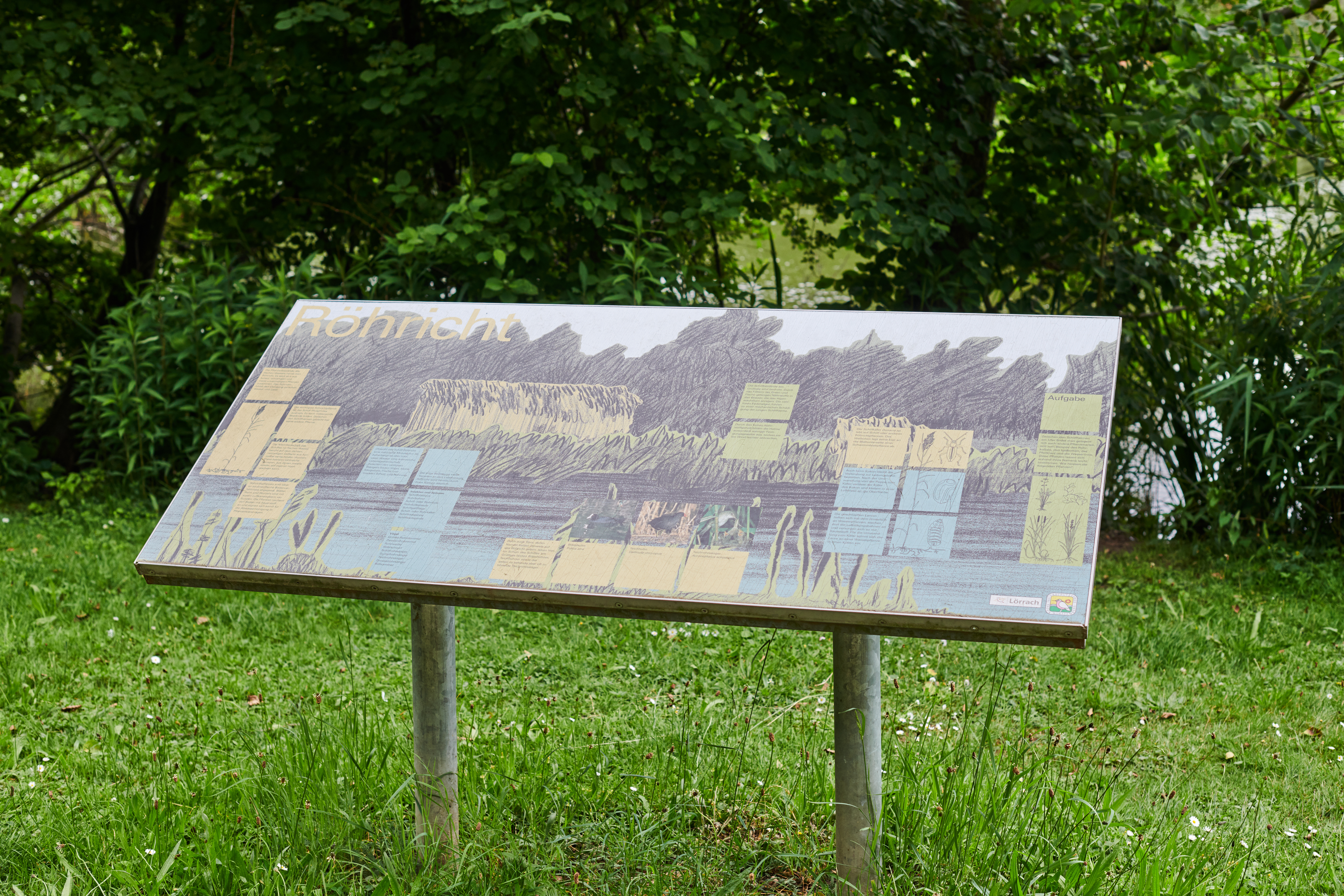
Station and information board of the nature trail at Lake Grüttsee

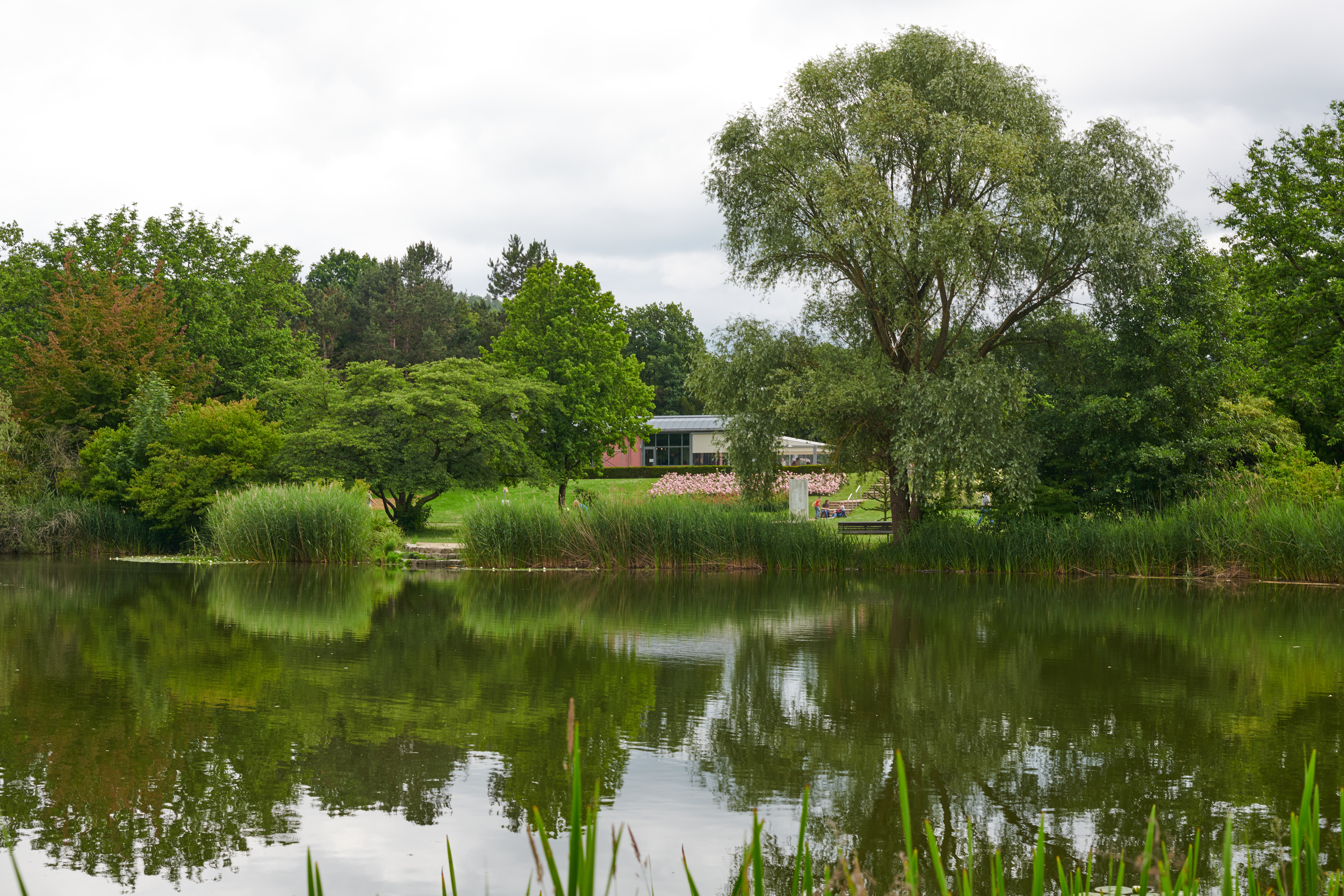
Shore vegetation of the Grüttsee

The Grütt Landscape Park, which natural area still belongs to the Markgräfler Hügelland or the foothills of the Dinkelberg, is characterized by extensive meadows. The lawn and plant areas make up over 80% of the total park area. Plants surround the water, particularly around the Grüttsee lake and at the source of the Grüttbach stream. At Lake Grüttsee, the water area merges into the land area through reedbeds. Native and exotic trees and shrubs make up the plant diversity of the park. Along the path towards the waterworks there are several redwoods (e.g. giant sequoia, primeval sequoia). There are currently around 60,000 trees and shrubs from around 60 species in the Grüttpark - at the State Garden Show there were around 25,000. In addition to the native poplars and alder trees, there are bitter orange trees, bald cypresss, medlars, snake skin maples and ginkgos in the Grütt.

Both the near-natural course of the Grüttbach stream and the Grove at the Grüttsee lake as well as two smaller peripheral areas are protected in accordance with 30 Federal Nature Conservation Act (BNatSchG) and 33 of the Baden-Württemberg Nature Conservation Act (NatSchG) on October 20, 1993, by the state of Baden-Württemberg as Biotope, a total of around 1.32 hectares of protected area. The renaturalized stream is between three and four metres wide and is only paved with stones in a few places. It contains small steps and gravel banks in places. The planted Galeriewäldchen, mainly consisting of gray alders, are very interspersed with gaps, so that they are not Riparian forests. The following plant species are mainly found in biotopes: black alder, gray alder, yellow iris, reed canary grass, sal willow and common snowball.

The following areas in the park are under special protection:

Biotop-Nr.	Biotop	Area (ha)	Number of subareas
183123360004	Near-natural stream course Landesgartenschau grounds	0,5081	10
183113360012	Near-natural stream in the Landesgartenschau grounds (west)	0,0859	2
183123360060	Grove at the Grüttsee	0,2733	1
183123360061	Sedimentation area at Lake Grüttsee	0,1162	5
183123360062	Field grove on Lörracher Straße	0,1363	1
183123360063	Rainmatten" grove	0,2017	2

=== Sculptures and other installations ===
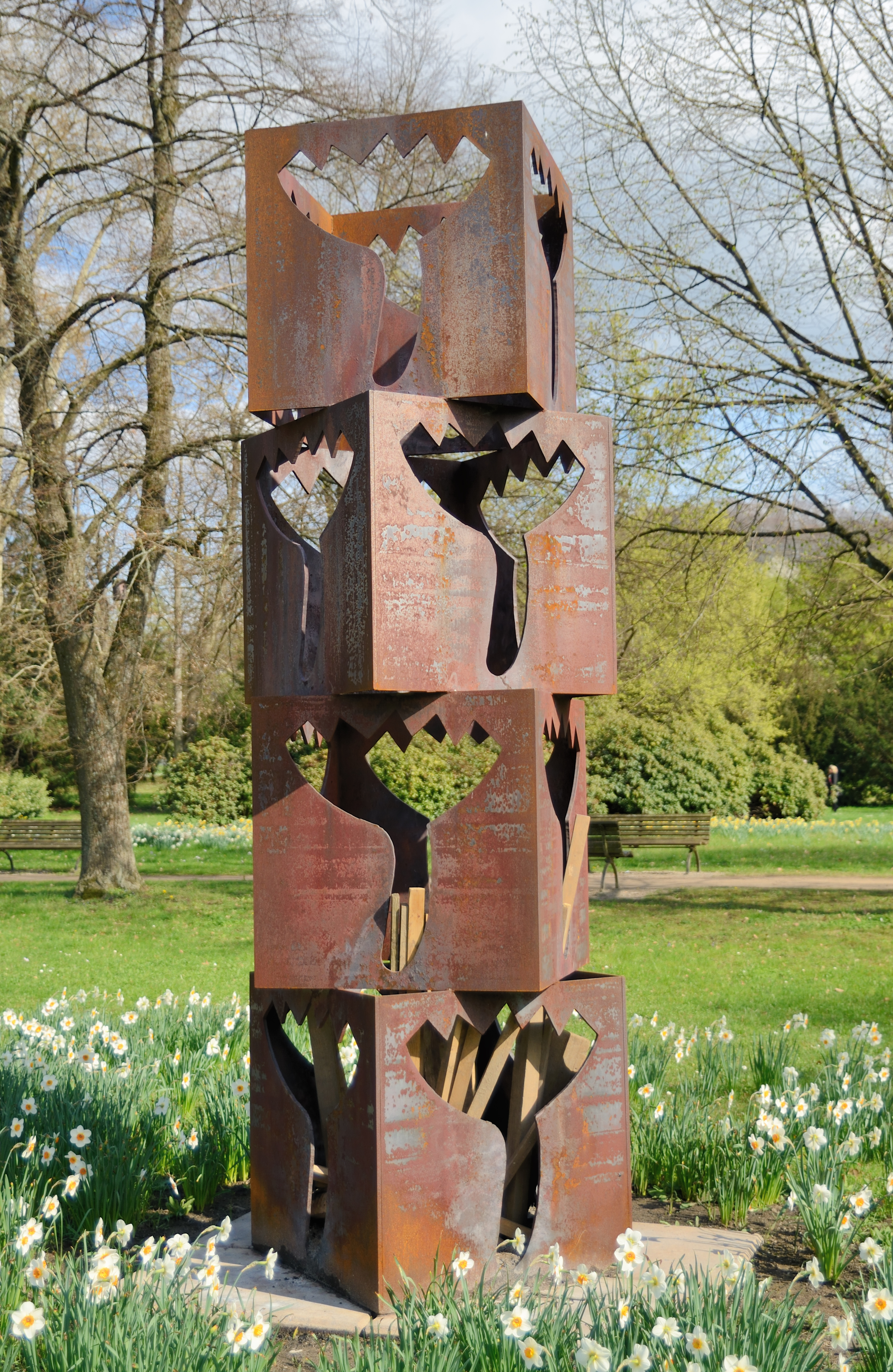
Feuer-Tulpen-Turm

Sculptures, other work of art and other installations are located in the park, particularly in the eastern section.

- The sculpture Guardian of Water by Konrad Winzer from 1983 stands at the artificial spring of the Grüttbach stream. On the bank, the 2.50 meter high and 1200 kilogram heavy work of art made of Wachau marble points out the worthiness of protecting the element of water.
- The bronze sculpture on a stone plinth, Encounter of Forms, was created by Herbert Bohnert from Lörrach-Haagen between 1982 and 1983.
- Four piled-up cubes punched out with stylized tulip motifs form the sculpture Fire Tulip Tower by Max Meinrad Geiger from Inzlingen. The work of art is filled with logs and lit twice a year, at the summer and winter solstice. The fire spectacle is often accompanied by music.
- On the eastern edge of Grüttpark there is a lawn labyrinth with seven circuits along an axis. It was created from May 7 to 29, 2001 as part of the REGIO girls' project Herzklopfen by pupils and supporters in two weeks of collaborative work. With a diameter of 20 meters, it contains a 300 meter long and 70 centimeter wide path, which was created by deep spade cuts and filled with granite chippings.
- A statue of Francis of Assisi stands at a central crossroads in the southern part of the park, not far from St. Peter's Church. The stone sculpture by an unknown artist bears the inscription "Praised be you Lord through all your creatures" - a quote attributed to Francis of Assisi.
- The southern entrance gate to the Grütt Landscape Park, consisting of three parallel wooden frames several meters high and overgrown with plants, was designed by Manfred Morlock from Schallstadt.
- In the middle of the rose garden, a water feature by artist Jörg Bollin stands in the center of concentric paths.
- Also in the rose garden, on the edge of the outer semi-circular perimeter, are three fountain sculptures made of Carrara marble, designed by Hans-Peter Wernet from Freiburg.
- On October 10, 1988, a memorial stone was dedicated in memory of the Lörrach Airfield, which was demolished in the mid-1950s, and the plane crash in Grütt on January 7, 1925. A bronze inscription plaque and a three-bladed propeller are attached to the natural stone. The memorial is located near the entrance to the Grüttpark stadium.
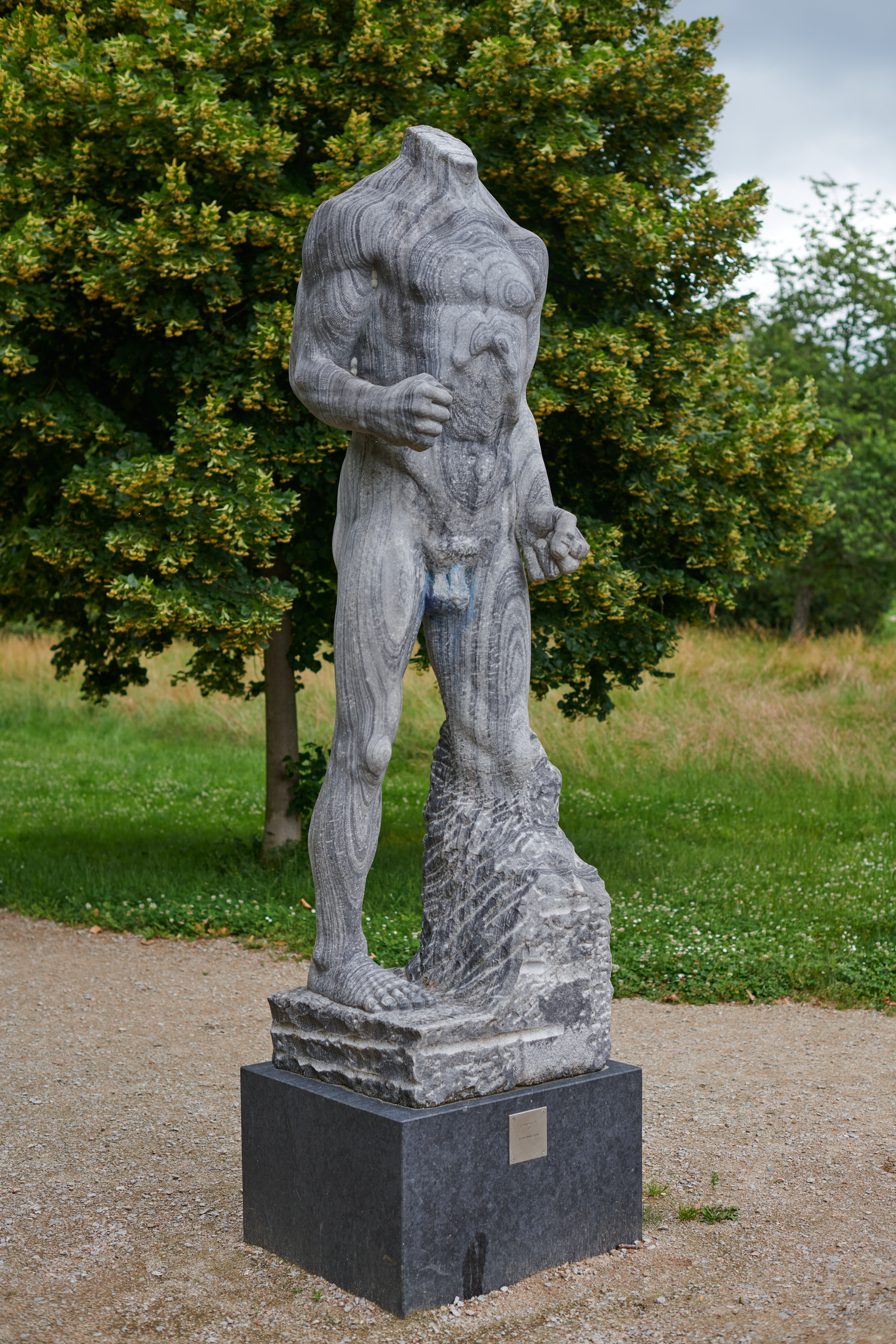
Hüter des Wassers

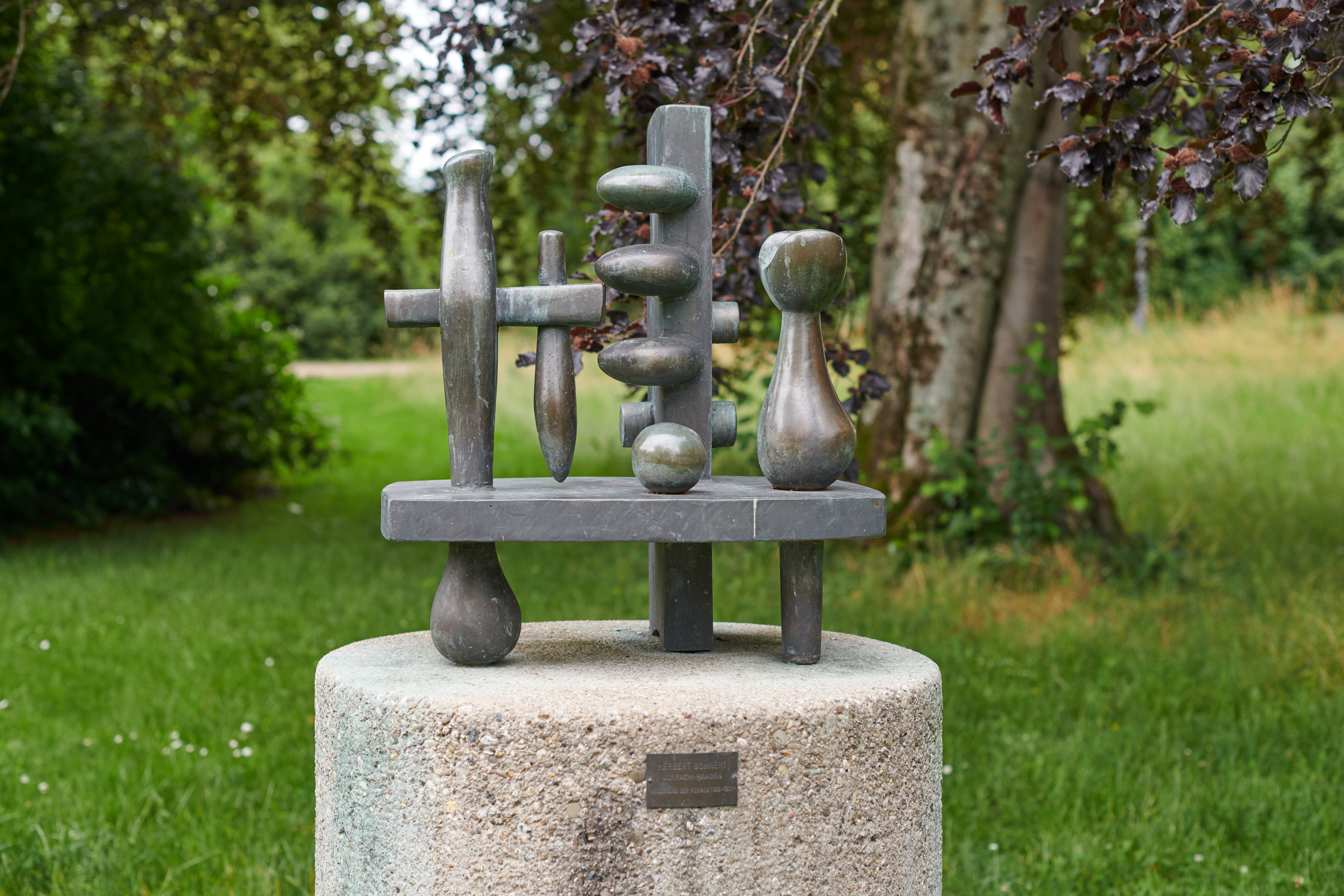
Begegnung der Formen

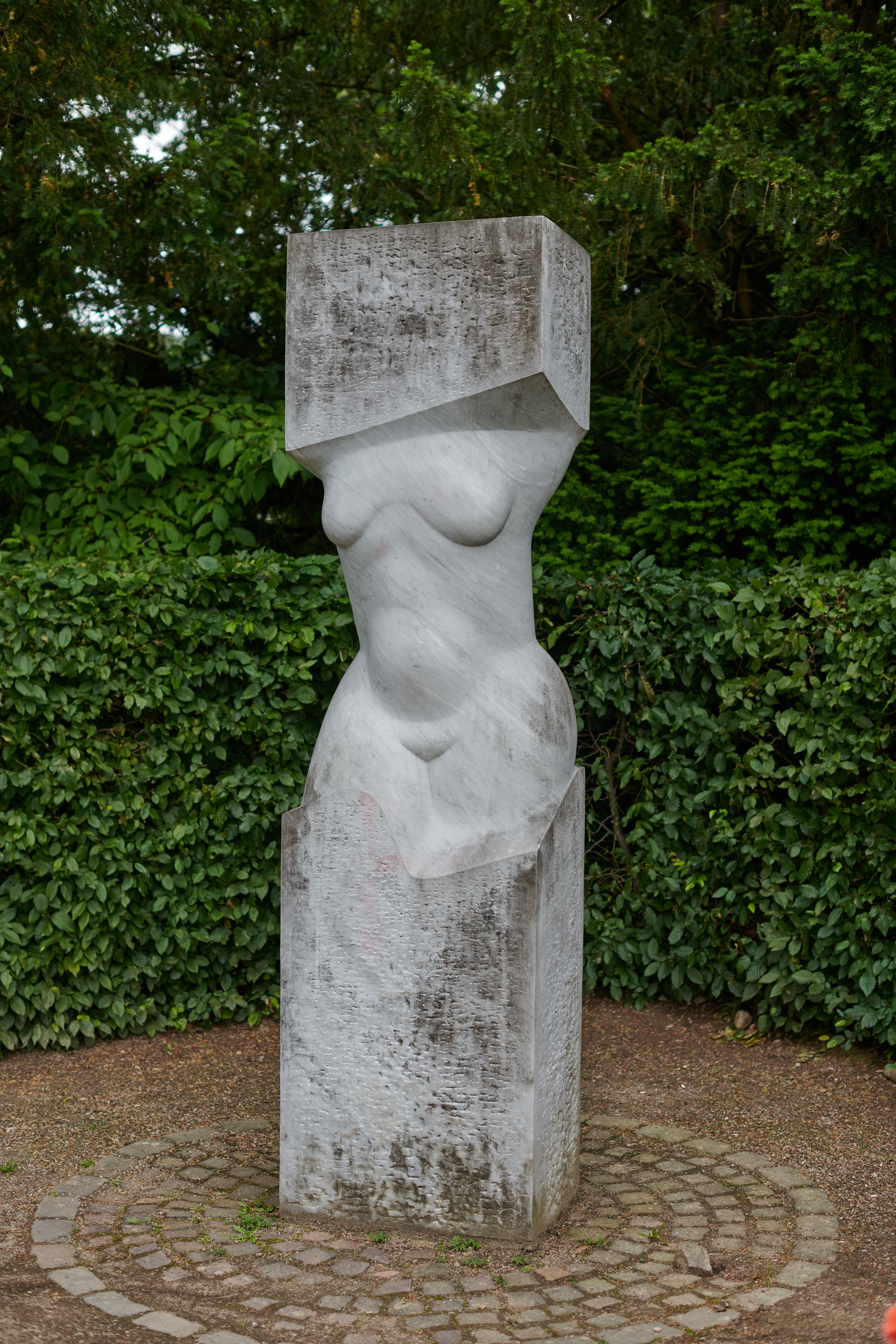
Brunnenplastik am Rosarium

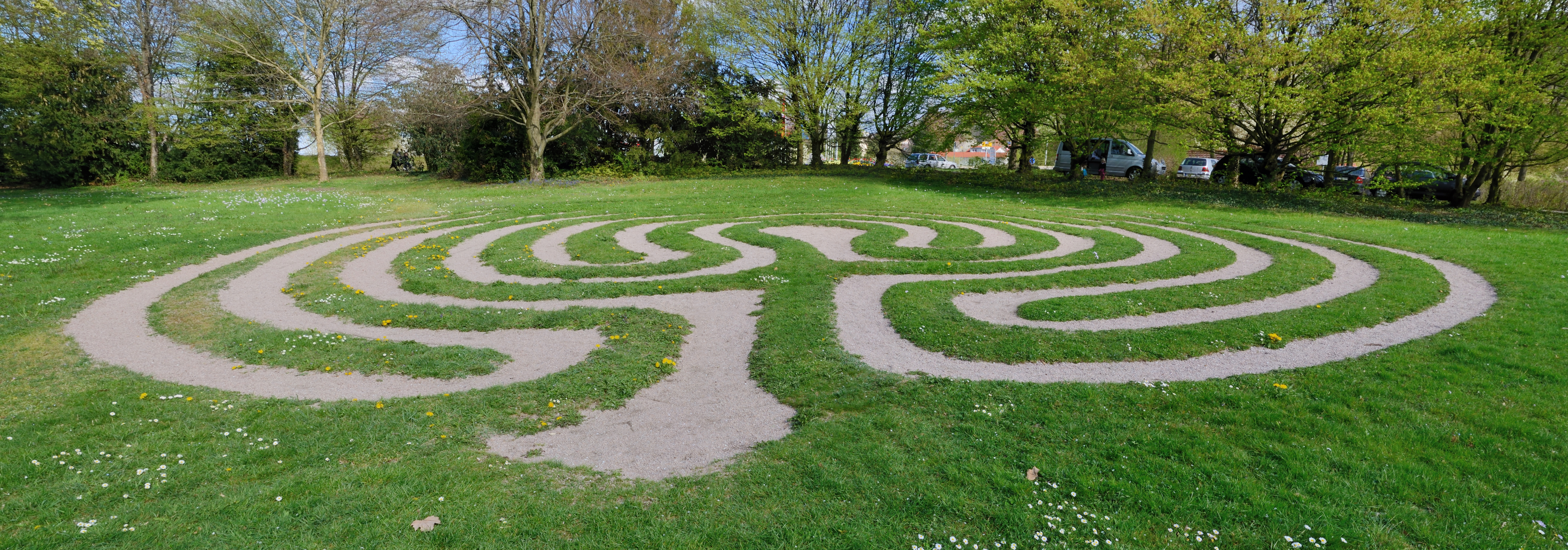
Rasenlabyrinth

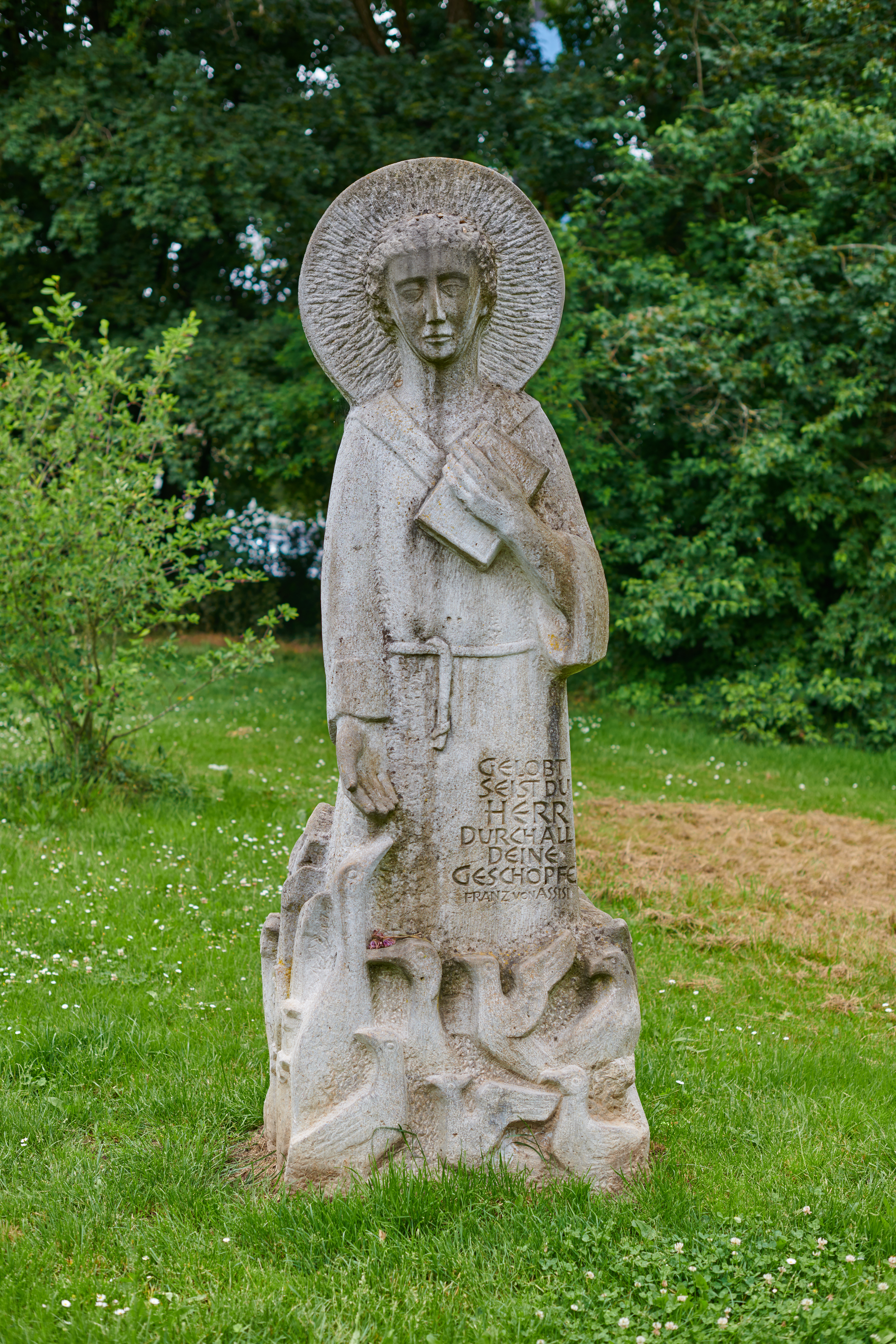
Statue des Franz von Assisi

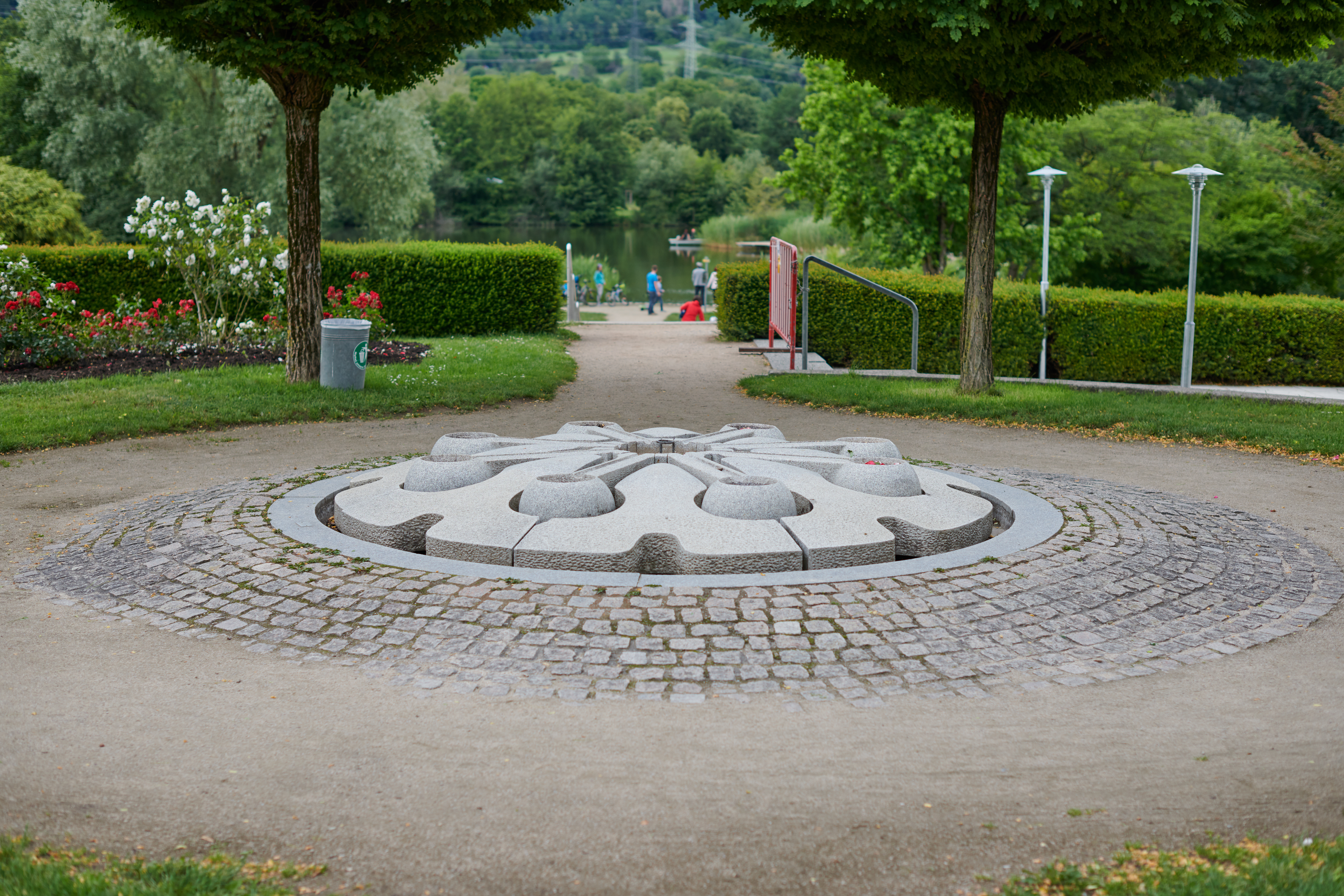
Wasserspiel Rosarium

=== Water supply ===
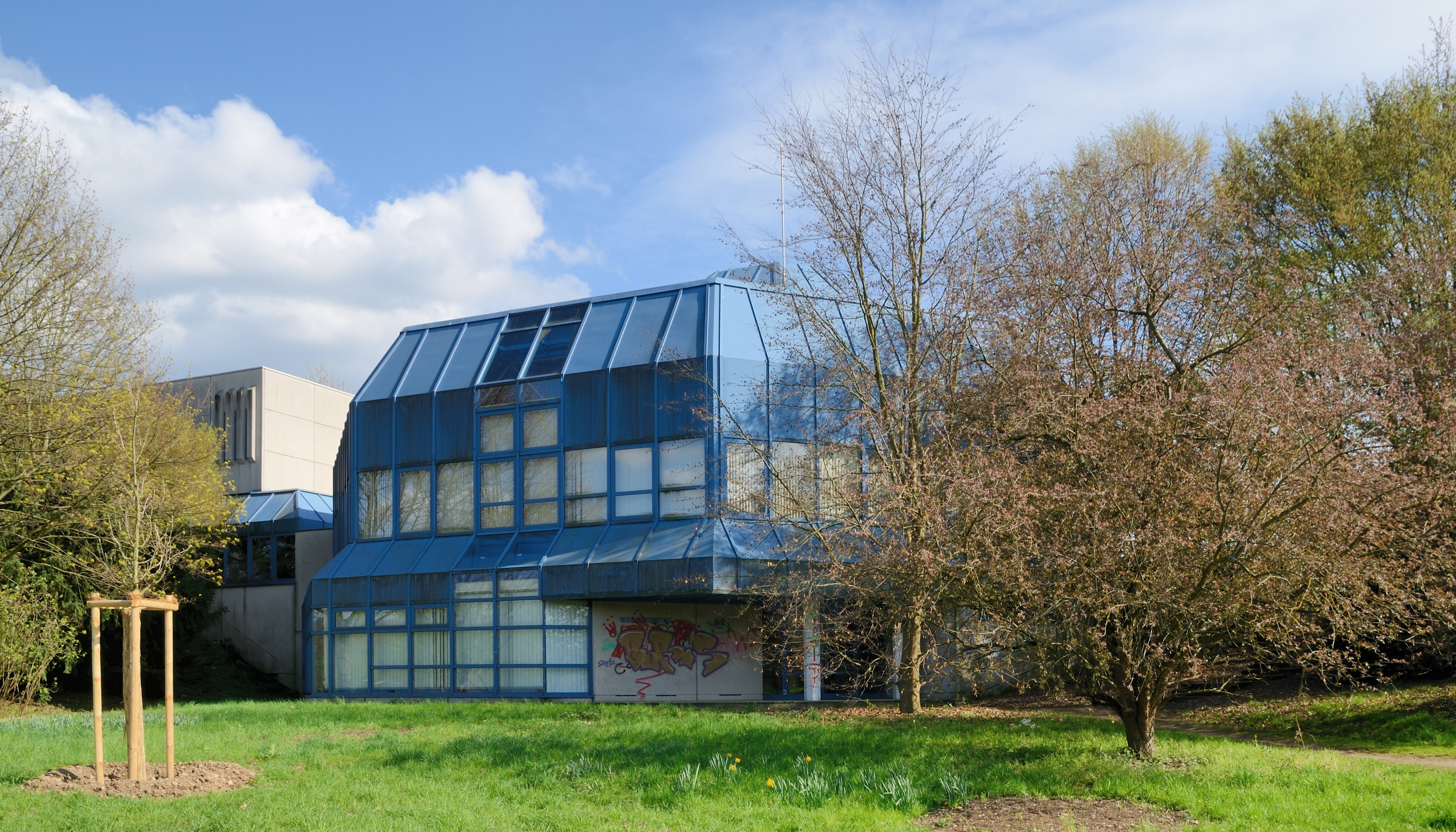
Lörrach waterworks: the filter building on the left, the operations building in the middle (blue)

Built in 1982 on the southern edge of the park, the waterworks prepares around 3.2 million cubic meters of water per year for the städtische Versorgung. The water comes from four deep wells distributed throughout the park, which pump their water up to a depth of 20 meters. The entire city of Lörrach has seven of these deep wells. This makes the Grütt of central importance for the city's water supply. The Lörrach waterworks with its striking blue façade cladding was initially put into operation at the end of 1982 on a trial basis and on April 29, 1983, inaugurated by the then Lord Mayor Egon Hugenschmidt, replaced the hundred-year-old predecessor building in Tumringer Straße, which has been used for events ever since. The purpose of the 10.9 million euro shell of the waterworks is to extract, treat and distribute water in the city. During the Landesgartenschau, events on the subject of water were held at the waterworks.

=== Traffic routes ===
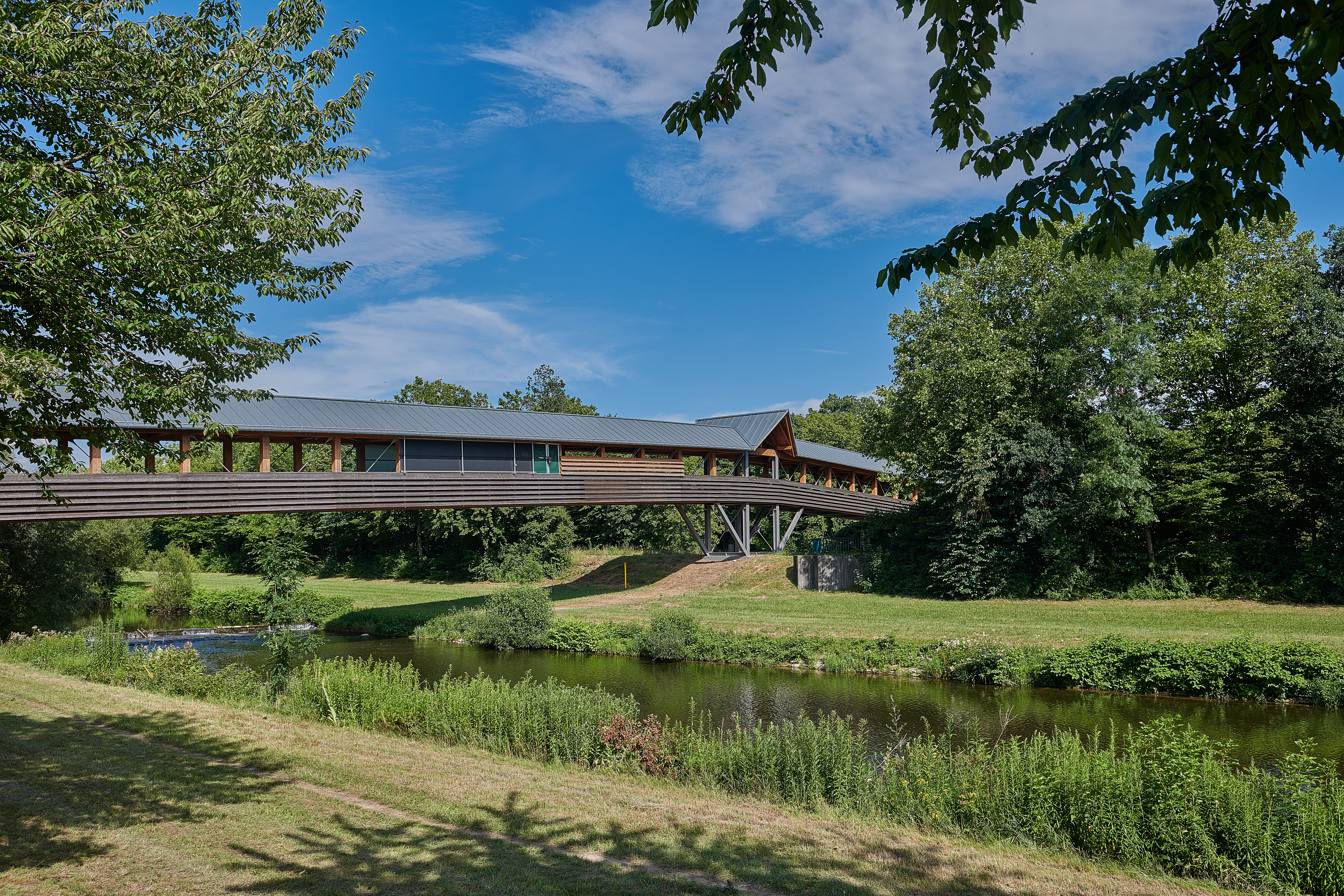
The covered wooden bridge over the meadow and main road provides access to the park from the north

The Wiesentalbrücke crosses the A 98 in the eastern part of the landscape park. The piers are surrounded by woodland-like vegetation, especially in the southern section. The areas of the 56 bridge piers have been approved by the city for legal graffiti since the beginning of August 2010. The approximately 110 several-meter-high images - some are up to 20 meters high - were created by international sprayers and are known as the Bridge Gallery.

To the east of the freeway is the Weidenpalast garden complex and adjacent to it the Grütt sports, leisure and exhibition center. In the north-eastern section, the park runs almost as far as the Homburger Wald, a wooded ridge that is part of the Dinkelberg. To the northwest, the landscape park is bordered by B 317, which runs parallel to the meadow in this section. The Grüttpark is divided into two parts in the eastern third of the park by the crossover between the B317 and the traffic circle at Brombacher Straße and Lörracher Straße. The cross span can be crossed in the north by a narrow bridge parallel to the railroad line and in the south by a barrier-free construction and step-free underpass.

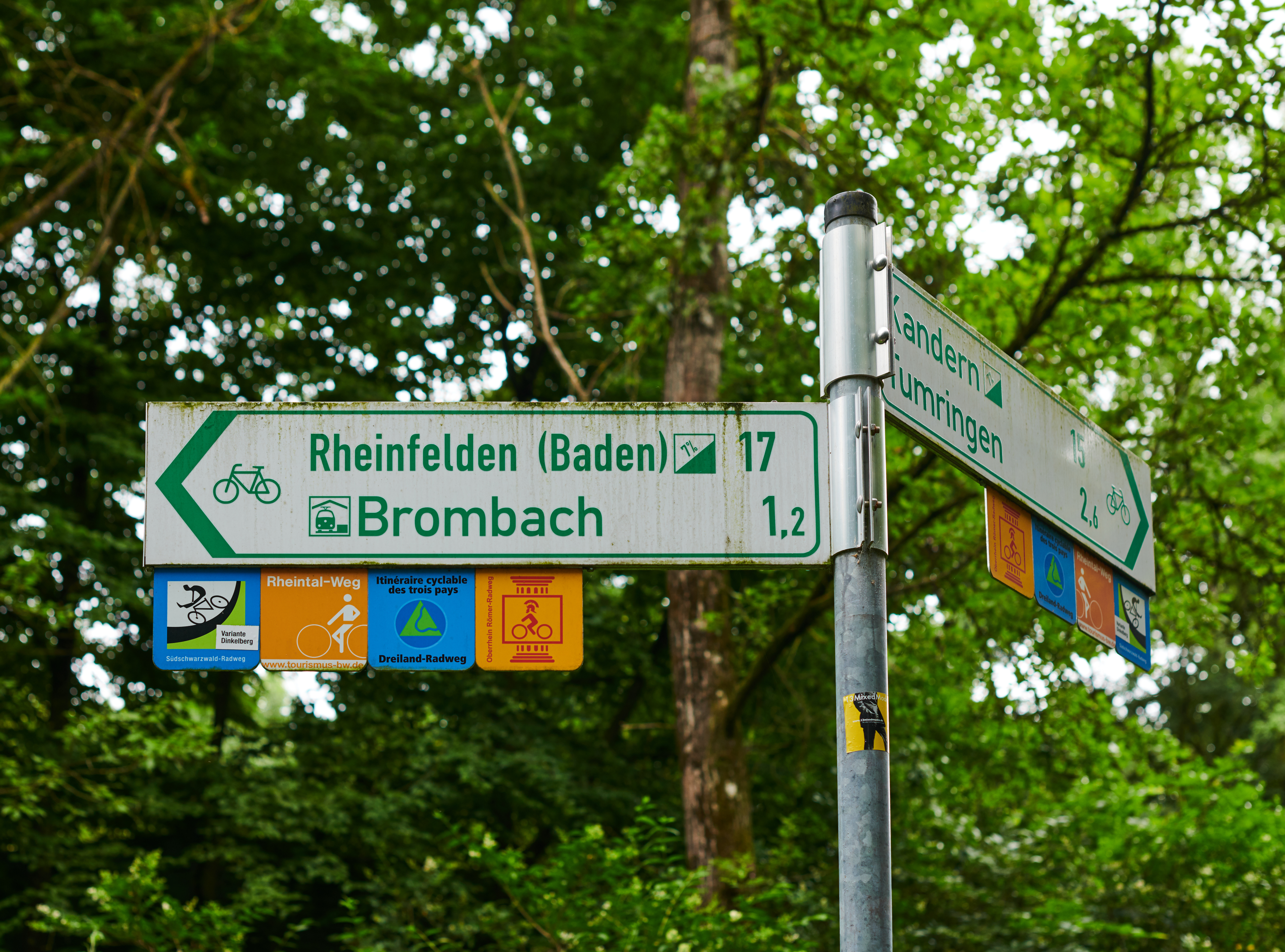
Signposts for the cycle paths in Grütt

One built in 1983 and completely replaced at the end of July 2016 for just under one million euros, 85 meter long and 2.80 meter wide gedeckt Holzbrücke with narrow steel diagonals for pedestrians and cyclists over the river Wiese and the main road connects the park with the district Haagen. The wooden truss bridge is made of spruce and larch wood and is the only access on the north-western flank of the park, which otherwise borders on the main road.

The 200-kilometre-long Upper Rhine Roman Cycle Route leads northwards from Brombach through the Grüttpark to the town center and from there over the Lucke to Binzen. The tourist Dreiland cycle path also crosses the park and then branches off over the wooden bridge from Brombach directly over the Lucke into Markgräflerland. Certain sections of the Rheintal-Weg also lead through the Grütt, such as the Dinkelberg variant of the Southern Black Forest Cycle Route. In addition, the inner-city commuter routes also use the Grütt Landscape Park's network of paths.

=== Sports infrastructure ===
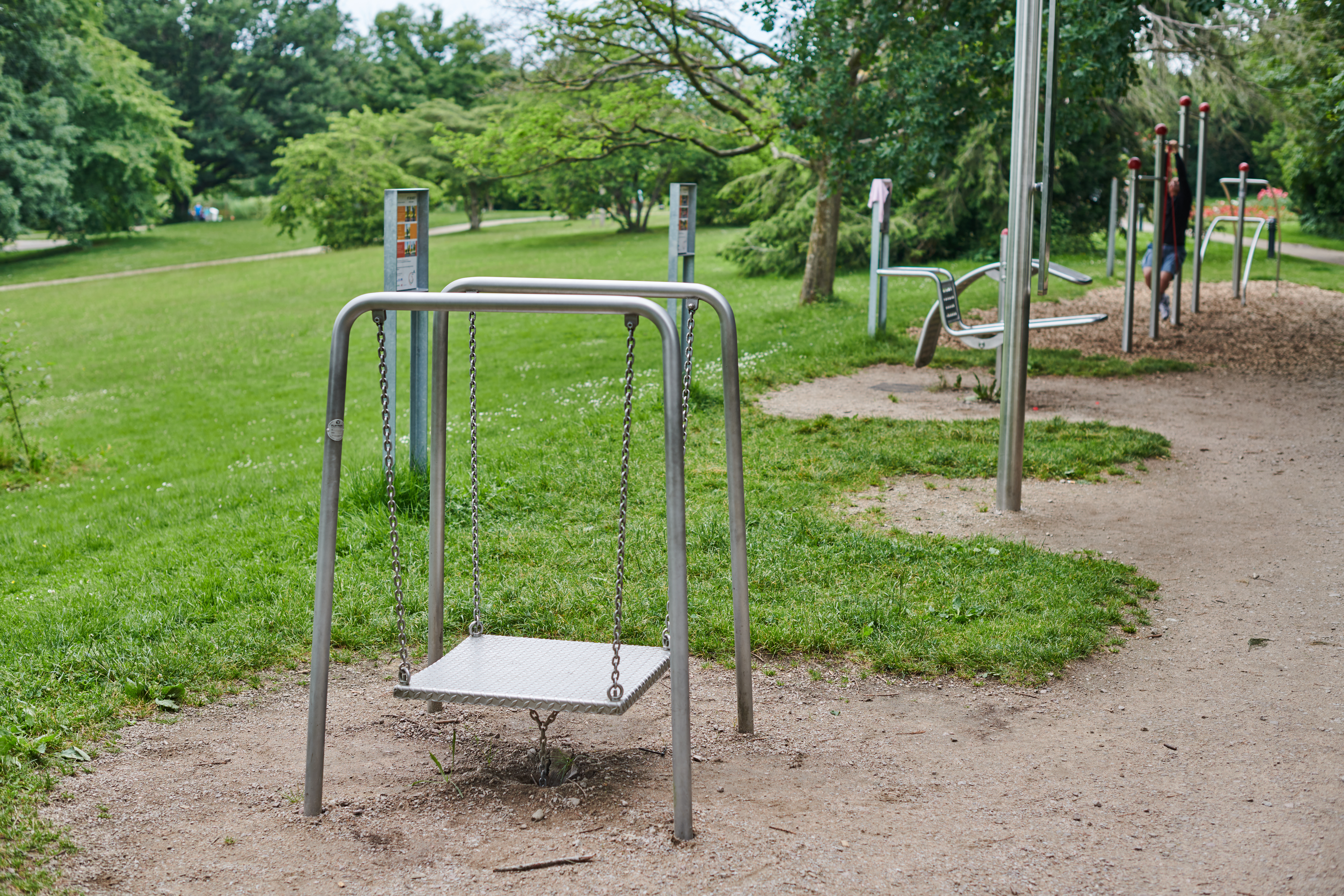
Equipment on the exercise trail

An exercise trail with six stations was set up in May 2014 along the promenade path in the southern part of Grüttpark. The installed equipment is designed to enable beginners and advanced users to do endurance and strength exercises in the open air with the help of exercise boards.

A permanent disc golf course with 18 stations has been installed on the green areas of the Grüttpark; it starts at the rose garden and runs around the Grüttsee. The system was installed in the park in 2014. An annual tournament is held in March.

Several running routes have been signposted in the park since 2010. The blue marked running circuit is 4.5 kilometers long and leads through all parts of the park. The shorter yellow (2.9 kilometers) and red laps (2.6 kilometers) are limited to the western part of the park. There are also two smaller loops around the Weidenpalast (800 meters) and around the Grüttsee (550 meters). All routes are without any significant inclines.

A pump track facility for kick scooter, BMX and mountain bike riders is installed in the north-western part of the park at the Grüttpark stadium. The course is designed for children, young people and adults. There is also a streetball and skate park at the Grüttpark stadium. The open sports facility also offers opportunities for skateboarding, inline skating or basketball.

== Literature ==
- Hubert Bernnat: Das Grütt – vom Auenwald zum Landschaftspark. in: Stadtbuch Lörrach 2020, Verlag Stadt Lörrach, 2020, ISBN 978-3-9820354-3-7, p. 136–143.
- Thomas Schwarze: Bäume im Grütt. In: Stadt Lörrach (Ed.): Lörrach 2008. Lörracher Jahrbuch mit Chronik vom 1. Oktober 2007 bis 30. September 2008., Waldemar Lutz Verlag, Lörrach, 2008, ISBN 978-3-922107-80-4, p. 36–61.
- Wolfgang Göckel: Lörrachs grüner Schatz. In: Stadt Lörrach (Ed.): Lörrach 2008. Lörracher Jahrbuch mit Chronik vom 1. Oktober 2007 bis 30. September 2008., Waldemar Lutz Verlag, Lörrach, 2008, ISBN 978-3-922107-80-4, p. 21–23.
- Ministerium für Ernährung, Landwirtschaft und Forsten (Ed.): 4. Landesgartenschau Baden-Württemberg. Lörrach 1983. Documentation, 1985.
- Stadt Lörrach (Ed.): Lörrach: Landschaft – Geschichte – Kultur. Verlag Stadt Lörrach, Lörrach 1983, ISBN 3-9800841-0-8, p. 550–554.
- Christian Vortisch: Wässerungsstreit im Grütt. Zusammenarbeit war im Wasserbau schon vor 400 Jahren nötig. In: Das Markgräflerland. 1973, 1/2, p. 38–50. (Digitalisat in der UB Freiburg)
