= Kreuz Hegau =

- Interactive map of Kreuz Hegau

Location
- Singen, Germany
- Coordinates: 47°48′24″N 8°51′26″E
- Roads at junction: A 98; B 33; A 81

Construction
- Type: Directional T interchange/Half-Cloverleaf interchange
- Lanes: 2x2/2x2/2x2
- Opened: 1982

The Kreuz Hegau (German:Autobahnkreuz Hegau, Abbreviation: AK Hegau) is a Directional T interchange/Half-Cloverleaf interchange in the German state of Baden-Württemberg.

The interchange connects the A98 coming from Stockach and the B33 coming from Konstanz to the A81 Stuttgart–Gottmadingen.

== Geography ==
The interchange lies in the region Hegau in Singen in the Landkreis Konstanz. It lies in the triangle Stuttgart-Konstanz-Schaffhausen.

== History ==
According to the original plans, the Kreuz Hegau would form the crossing between the A 98 Basel-Schaffhausen-Singen-Lindau (a.k.a. Voralpenautobahn) and the A 81 Stuttgart-Singen-Konstanz. This did not happen, and the Bodenseeautobahn A 98 towards Lindau was only built to Stockach.

The part of the A 98 from the interchange towards Schaffhausen was, on request of the CDU in 1977 in the government of Baden-Württemberg renamed to A 81. The parts of the A 81 towards Konstanz that were being built, were first renamed to A881, and later to B 33. The A 98 planned and built towards Stockach is still in use.

In the early 1990s, the Autobahnkreuz Singen, as they named it after completion, was renamed to Autobahnkreuz Hegau. Construction for Autobahnkreuz Singen began in Autumn 1977.

Due to its unusual building form with a main north/southwest relation, the interchange has the only left hand junction in mainland Europe, the junction from direction Stuttgart for the B33 to Konstanz.

== Traffic near the interchange ==
From	to	Average daily traffic	Percentage heavy traffic
AS Engen (A 81)	AK Hegau	36,400	9.8%
AK Hegau	AS Singen (A 81)	27,200	7.0%
AK Hegau (A 98)	Autobahnend (B 31)	22,200	11.3%
