= Bundesautobahn 861 =

Federal motorway in Germany

A 861
- Bundesautobahn 861

Route information
- Length: 4.3 km (2.7 mi)

Major junctions
- North end: north of Rheinfelden
- South end: Rheinfelden border crossing

Location
- Country: Germany
- States: Baden-Württemberg

Highway system
- Roads in Germany; Autobahns; List; Federal; List; State; E-roads

Bundesautobahn 861 (translates from German as Federal Motorway 861, short form Autobahn 861, abbreviated as BAB 861 or A 861) is an autobahn in Germany.

The A 861 opened on 7 March 2006. Originally, its northern terminus with the A 98 was merely a ninety-degree turn accompanied by a designation change. The A 98 was completed east of this interchange in late 2021. At the southern end of the A 861 is the Rheinfelden border crossing with Switzerland. A small portion of motorway connects this crossing to Switzerland's A 3 at junction 14. Vehicles on this small section of motorway do not need the vignette that is normally required to travel on Swiss motorways. This is to allow German traffic and Swiss traffic that do not have vignettes to cross between the Swiss and German halves of Rheinfelden without having to buy one. A vignette is required to go past the junction Rheinfelden-West, as traffic then must enter the A 3.

The European route E54 is concurrent with the A 861 until junction 2.

== Exit list ==
State	District	Location	km	mi	Exit	Name	Destinations	Notes
Baden-Württemberg	Lörrach (district)	Rheinfelden (Baden)	4.3	2.7	1	Dreieck Hochrhein	A 98 – Karlsruhe, Lörrach, Schaffhausen, Rheinfelden-Ost	northern endpoint of motorway
Baden-Württemberg	Lörrach (district)	Rheinfelden (Baden)				Nollinger Berg-Tunnel		length: 1268 m
Baden-Württemberg	Lörrach (district)	Rheinfelden (Baden)	2.3	1.4	2	Rheinfelden-Mitte	B 316 – Rheinfelden-Mitte, Bad Säckingen	
Baden-Württemberg	Lörrach (district)	Rheinfelden (Baden)	0.2	0.12	3	Rheinfelden-Süd	B 34 – Rheinfelden-Süd, Grenzach-Wyhlen	
Baden-Württemberg	Lörrach (district)	Rheinfelden (Baden)	0.0	0.0	4	Grenzübergang Rheinfelden	A 3 – Zürich, Bern, Luzern, Basel, Rheinfelden-West	southern endpoint of motorway
1.000 mi = 1.609 km; 1.000 km = 0.621 mi: Concurrency terminus; Incomplete access; Proposed; Route transition
