= Bundesautobahn 98 =

Federal motorway in Germany

Coordinates: 47°44′31″N 011°19′55″E

A 98
- Bundesautobahn 98
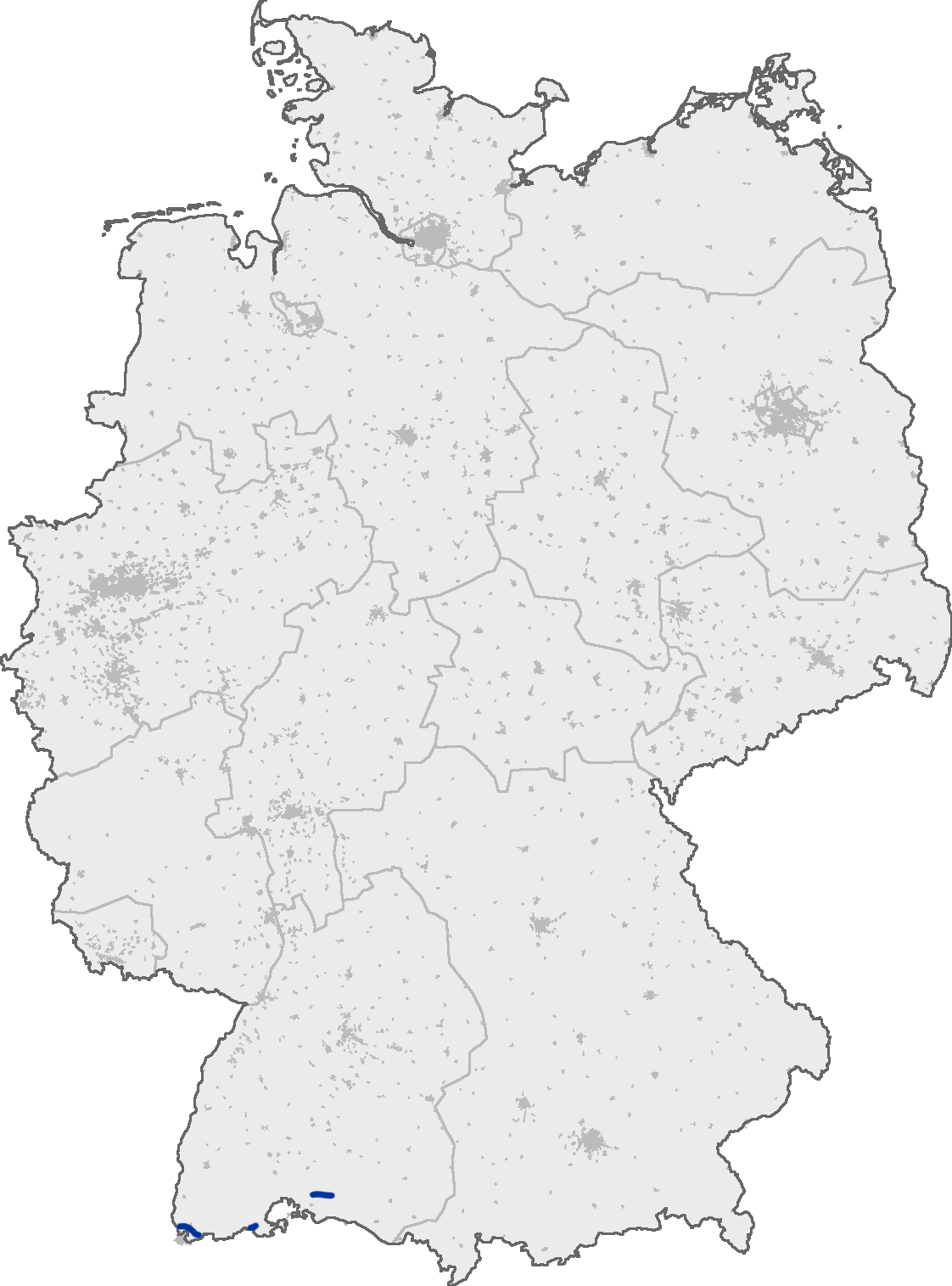

Route information
- Length: 47 km (29 mi)

Major junctions
- West end: Bundesautobahn 5 in Weil am Rhein, Baden-Württemberg
- East end: Rheinfelden, Baden-Württemberg

Location
- Country: Germany
- States: Baden-Württemberg

Highway system
- Roads in Germany; Autobahns; List; Federal; List; State; E-roads
← A 96	→ A 99

Bundesautobahn 98 (translates from German as Federal Motorway 98, short form Autobahn 98, abbreviated as BAB 98 or A 98) is a 47 kilometres (29 mi) long motorway in southern Germany, originally intended to connect Weil am Rhein with the A 8 near Irschenberg.

Currently, only three relatively short unconnected sections have been constructed:

- Weil am Rhein to near Eichsel, where the road diverges south to become the A 861 towards Rheinfelden (Baden) and the Swiss border;
- east of Waldshut-Tiengen to north of Lauchringen; and
- north of Singen to north of Überlingen.

== Exit list ==
	(1)	Weil am Rhein 3-way interchange A 5 E35 E54
	(2)	Eimeldingen B 3
		Straßenbrücke 80 m
		Bahn-und Straßenbrücke 70 m
	(3)	Binzen
		parking area
	(4)	Kandern
		Gewerbekanalbrücke 90 m
	(5)	Lörrach-Mitte B 317
		Wiesental bridge 1211 m
	(6)	Lörrach-Ost B 316 E54
		(planned)
		Holzattalbrücke 400 m
		Dultenaugrabrücke 444 m
		Günbrücke (Kalkofen) 40 m
		Dorfbachtalbrücke 310 m
	(7)	Hochrhein 3-way interchange A 861
		Tunnel Herrschaftsbuck 485 m
	(8)	Rheinfelden-Karsau
		Dürrenbachbrücke 200 m (planned)
		Hirschbächlebrücke 185 m (planned)
		Hollwangerbrücke 312 m (planned)
		Finstergassbrücke 192 m (planned)
		Bachteletalbrücke 356 m (planned)
		Ossenberg (planned)
		Wolfsgrabenbrücke 486 m (planned)
		Tunnel Eichbühltunnel 460 m (planned)
		Lachengrabenbrücke 138 m (planned)
		Tunnel Landschaftstunnel 130 m (planned)
		Wehreatalbrücke 610 m (planned)
		Wallbach (planned)
		Tunnel Bergseetunnel 930 m (planned)
		Schöpfebachbrücke 220 m (planned)
		Bad Säckingen (planned) L152
		Heimbachbrücke 100 m (planned)
	(11)	Murg
		Rothenbachbrücke 150 m
		Murgtalbrücke 290 m
		Tunnel Groß-Ehrstädt 280 m
		Tunnel Rappenstein 395 m
		Andelsbachtalbrücke 550 m
	(12)	Laufenburg B 34
	( )	Luttingen B 34
		Hauenstein (planned)
		Mühletalbrücke 250 m (planned)
		(planned)
		Albtalbrücke 100 m (planned)
		Talbrücke Schweizermatte 200 m (planned)
		Mühlbachtalbrücke 300 m (planned)
		Schürlebachbrücke 300 m (planned)
		Talbrücke Erlenmatte 150 m (planned)
		Liederbachbrücke 500 m (planned)
		Waldshut (planned) B 500
		Tunnel Haspeltunnel 1100 m (planned)
		Seltenbachbrücke 350 m (planned)
		Tunnel Mühlebergtunnel 1050 m (planned)
		Schlüchtbrücke (planned)
	( )	Tiengen-West B 34
		Wutachbrücke 150 m
		Tunnel Bürgerwaldtunnel 1436 m
		Wutachbrücke 200 m
	( )	Tiengen-Ost B 34
		Tunnel Heidenäckertunnel 160 m
	( )	Lauchringen B 314
		Wutachbrücke (planned)
		Geißlingen (planned) B 34
	(11)	Kreuz Hegau 4-way interchange A 81 E41 E54
		Krebsbachtalbrücke 150 m
		Rest area Nellenburg
		Stockacher Aach 190 m
		Rest area Nellenburg
	(12)	Stockach-West B 313
		Straßenbrücke 50 m
	(13)	Stockach-Ost B 31 E54
End of the motorway		End of the motorway
B 31n		to Überlingen
