= Wiesental, Black Forest =

Valley of the river Wiese, in the Southern Black Forest

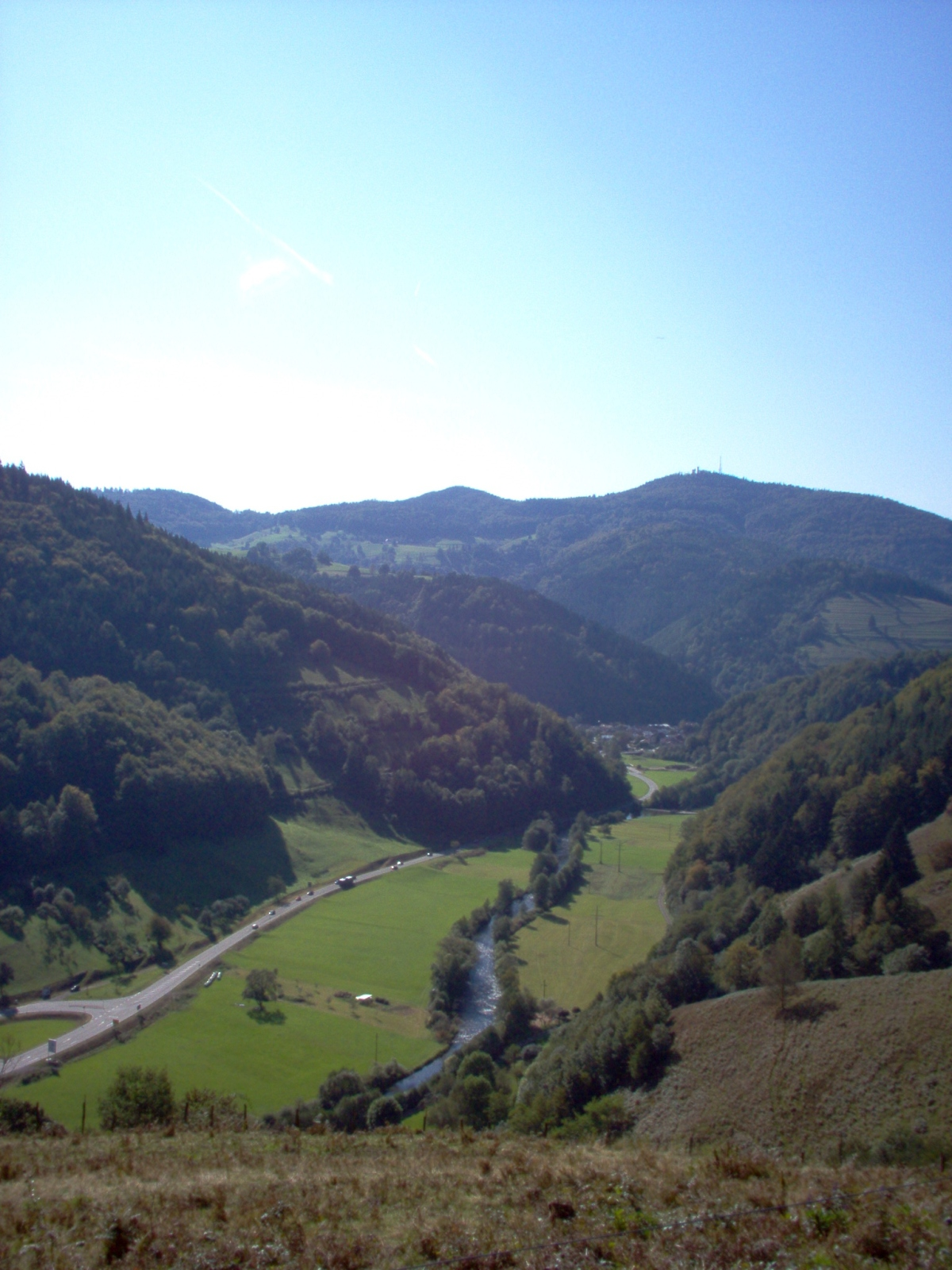
View over the Wiesental, near Zell im Wiesental

The Wiesental (German pronunciation: [ˈviːzn̩taːl], lit. 'Wiese Valley'), named after the river Wiese, is a valley in the Southern Black Forest. The Wiese is a right-hand tributary of the Rhine which has its source in Feldberg and flows into the Rhine in Basel, Switzerland. The Wiesental was one of the first industrialized regions of the former grand dutchy of Baden and an important production location for the textile industry.

== Geography ==
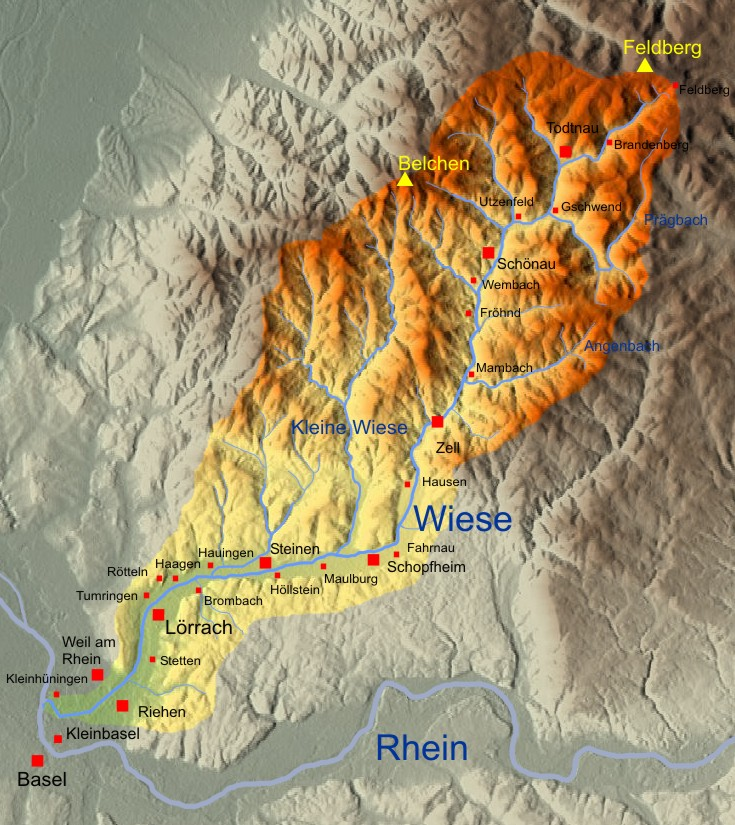
Wiesental with catchment area of the Wiese in the Black Forest

With the exception of the two Swiss communes Riehen and Basel, as well as the Feldberg commune with the source of the Wiese (Landkreis Breisgau-Hochschwarzwald), the Wiesental belongs entirely to the district of Landkreis Lörrach. The 55 km long river Wiese flows through the valley in a South-Western direction from the Feldberg (1200 meters above sea level) to Basel (244 meters above sea level). The Wiese merges with its biggest tributary, the "Little Wiese", approximately below Schopfheim. The Köhlgarten- and Belchenwiese merge to become the Little Wiese nearTegernau. Its valley is known as Kleines Wiesental ("Little Wiesental").

The biggest city in Wiesental is Lörrach with around 48 000 inhabitants, followed by Schopfheim with around 19 000 inhabitants.

== Geology ==
The back part of the valley is mainly made of Gneiss and Granite. However near Zell, the right side of the valley is mostly made of Sandstone while its left side is made of Limestone (see Dinkelberg, Homburger Wald or Eichener See).

== Traffic ==
The 317 crosses the valley alongside the Wiese in a south-westerly direction. Near Schopfheim the 518 branches off in the direction of the Wehratal and Hochrhein. Additionally, near Lörrach the A98 crosses the valley on the Wiesental Bridge, resembling a viaduct. The Wiesentalbahn, which is operated by the Swiss SBB, runs parallel to the Wiese, connecting Zell and Basel SBB station.

Formerly a light railway ran from Zell to Todtnau ("Todtnauerli") but this has been out of use since 1967. The Wehratalbahn, which ran from Schopfheim, through Wehr, and ended in the Rhine valley, was also abandoned.

== History ==
=== First Settlement ===
Roman remains near Maulburg and Brombach provide evidence that the Wiesental was inhabited fairly early. The population of the valley increased greatly later; remains near Fahrnau and Schopfheim suggest that settlement of the central part of the Wiesental began around 700 AD, while the far end of the valley was most likely not populated until the 10th and 11th century. The district of Brombach, Lörrach, was documented as early as the year 786. The Wiesental's oldest town is Schopfheim (first documented in 807), which was also the first to gain market rights from the Lords of Rötteln around 1250.

=== Land Tenure since the High Middle Ages ===
During the High Middle Ages the Wiesental was owned by numerous clerics and secular masters. Lörrach, Brombach and Rötteln were important locations for the Lords of Rötteln, who were reeves of the St. Alban cloister in Basel. Their castle sits above Lörrach. Additionally, the Röttler owned numerous parts of the centre of the Wiesental (e.g. Maulburg, Schopfheim) and the Little Wiesental. The Lords of Rotenburg, another Röttler line, owned a castle near Wieslet. The Lords of Waldeck had tenure and rights in Fahrnau, Steinen, Hägelberg and Fröhnd, the noble family Kaltenbach ruled in the neighbouring Kandertal, and the Kienberg family owned land on the Dinkelberg, as well as in Gresgen. Other families with large properties were the Klingens of Langenau and Gersbach, and the Wehrs from the upper Wiesental. The noble family Wart held rights in Endenburg, Schlächtenaus and Weitenau, while the von Grenchens had theirs in Fröhnd, Schönau, Wembach and Höllstein. Moreover, numerous cloisters held rights and tenure in the Wiesental, namely St. Blasien and the cloister of Säckingen. Several houses (von Waldeck, von Eichstetten, von Wehr-Wildenstein, von Grenchen and Höllstein) handed over the entire territory of Schönau and Todtnau to the cloister of St.Blasien during the 12th century. Furthermore, the cloister received Fröhnd from the Lords of Stein and Künaberg and owned a church in Weitenau in the centre of the Wiesental. The territory around Zell and Häg-Ehrsberg belonged to the cloister of Säckingen. A large part of the gentry's property was acquired by cloisters during the 12th century. The Lords of Kaltenbach gave their property to the cloister St. Blasien and thereby founded the Bürgeln priory. The Weitenau priory's property can be traced back to the Lords of Wart. The Lords of Waldeck handed over their property to the cloister St. Blasien as well and the Wettingen cloister was given possessions from the Lords of Üsenberg.

Thanks to the cloister's property, new noble families gained agency and tenure in the Wiesental. The Lords of Stein, who worked as stewards in Zell and Häg for the Damenstift Säckingen and handed down their duties to the family of Schönau, are one example. The demesne Neuenstein was also given to them by the Lords of Stein, but was later sold to Rudolf III of Hachberg-Sausenberg in 1400. At the time of sale, the territory spanned the Wiesen- and Wehravallies including Gersbach, Schlechtbach, Raitbach, Kürnberg, Schweigmatt, as well as other farms, which nowadays are part of East Schopfheim. Furthermore, the Habsburger became important Lords in the Wiesental, particularly in the upper Wiesental, where they were reeves of the cloisters Säckingen (after 1181) and St. Blasien (after 1254). As reeves of the cloister Murbach, they claimed sovereignty over Schopfheim. From the 13th century onwards, consolidation began. Firstly, the Lords of Rötteln inherited the property of both the Lords of Waldeck and Wehr, but their house died out with Lüthold II in 1316, and its properties were passed on to the House of Hachberg-Sausenberg. The margraves of Hachberg had already inherited Sausenberg near Kandern, which used to be under the rule of the House Kaltenbach. However, they also died in 1503, and their property was passed on to the margraves of Baden (more specifically, Baden-Durlach). The margraves of Hachberg had already started consolidating their dominion, and their successors continued with these policies. Therefore, the front part of the Wiesental is also part of the Markgräflerland. In the upper Wiesental the property of the cloisters Säckingen (priory Zell) and St. Blasien (priory Schönau and Todtnau) was under the rule of the Habsburger. As a result, the upper Wiesental was part of Further Austria until 1805. It wasn't until the Peace of Pressburg on 26 December 1805 that this territory became part of the Grand Duchy of Baden.

Map of the Markgräflerland illustrating the border between Hausen and Zell

The border between Further Austria and Baden-Durlach ran approximately through the centre of the valley, through Hausen and Zell. The division between both principalities was not only political but also religious: Parts of the Habsburger stayed Catholic, while Baden-Durlach turned Protestant. This geographic difference in confession is still present today.

=== Modern Age ===
The Wiesental was an important location during the Revolutions of 1848. Georg Herwegh moved through the valley with his Legion (German Democrats) and was defeated on April 27, 1848, in Dossenbach. Friedrich Hecker also traveled across the valley for a few weeks, and was joined by volunteers in Utzenfeld. The decisive battle between Hecker and the federal troops took place on April 20, 1848, on the Scheideck, between Kandern and Schlächtenhaus (see Battle on the Scheideck ). In September, Gustav Struve declared a "German Republic" ("Deutsche Republik") in Lörrach. However, his insurgence was crushed.

== Industry ==
The Wiesental was the center of textile production until the 20th century. The industrialisation of the valley had begun early. The reason for this was the hydraulic power of the Wiese: not only does the river fall a long way, but is also at a relatively constant water level. Another reason for the economic boom of the valley was the proximity to Switzerland and Alsace, which also attracted capital from these countries. The importance of the Wiesental for the Grand Duchy of Baden was also sung about in the Badnerlied. One verse reads:

Im Wiesental Fabriken stehn,
wie Schlösser klar und hell,
Rauchfahnen aus Kaminen wehn,
von Lörrach bis nach Zell.

In the Wiesen valley there are factories,
Bright and fair like castles,
Trails of smoke are blown,
From Lörrach up to Zell.

However, towards the end of the 20th century, the Textile industry withdrew more and more from the valley. Nowadays textile factories remain in only a few cities. Today, the Wiesental's economy is based on mechanical engineering companies, a few of which are leaders on the global market. The center of the Wiesental for example is known for its vacuum pump industry.

== Culture and Landmarks ==
=== Dialects ===
In the Wiesen walley, High Alemannic German is spoken, which is very similar form to the Alemannic German in Swiss German. What is especially noticeable in this dialect is the shifting of the German "k" in initial position to "ch": for example, child (Kind) and head (Kopf) are pronounced "Chind" and "Chopf" in High Alemannic German. In addition, the dialect of the Wiesen valley is not homogeneous: pronunciation and vocabulary can vary from town to town. Johann Peter Hebels´ "Alemannic poems" ("Allemannische Gedichte") are good example of the Wiesental dialect. These poems were written by the author in the language of his homeland. The poem "The Evening Star" ("Der Abendstern") makes a direct reference to the Wiesental:

Er seit: "O Muetter, lueg doch au,
do unte glänzts im Morgethau
so schön wie in di'm Himmelssaal!"
‚He‘, seit sie, ‚drum isch's Wiesethal.‘

Er sagt: "Oh Mutter, sieh doch auch
dort unten glänzts im Morgentau
so schön wie in deinem Himmelssaal!"
„Freilich“, sagt sie, „deswegen ist's das Wiesental“.

He says: "Oh Mother see,
down there it shines in the morning dew
as beautiful as heaven´s hall!"
„Indeed“, she says, that is why it is the Wiesental“.

=== Landmarks ===
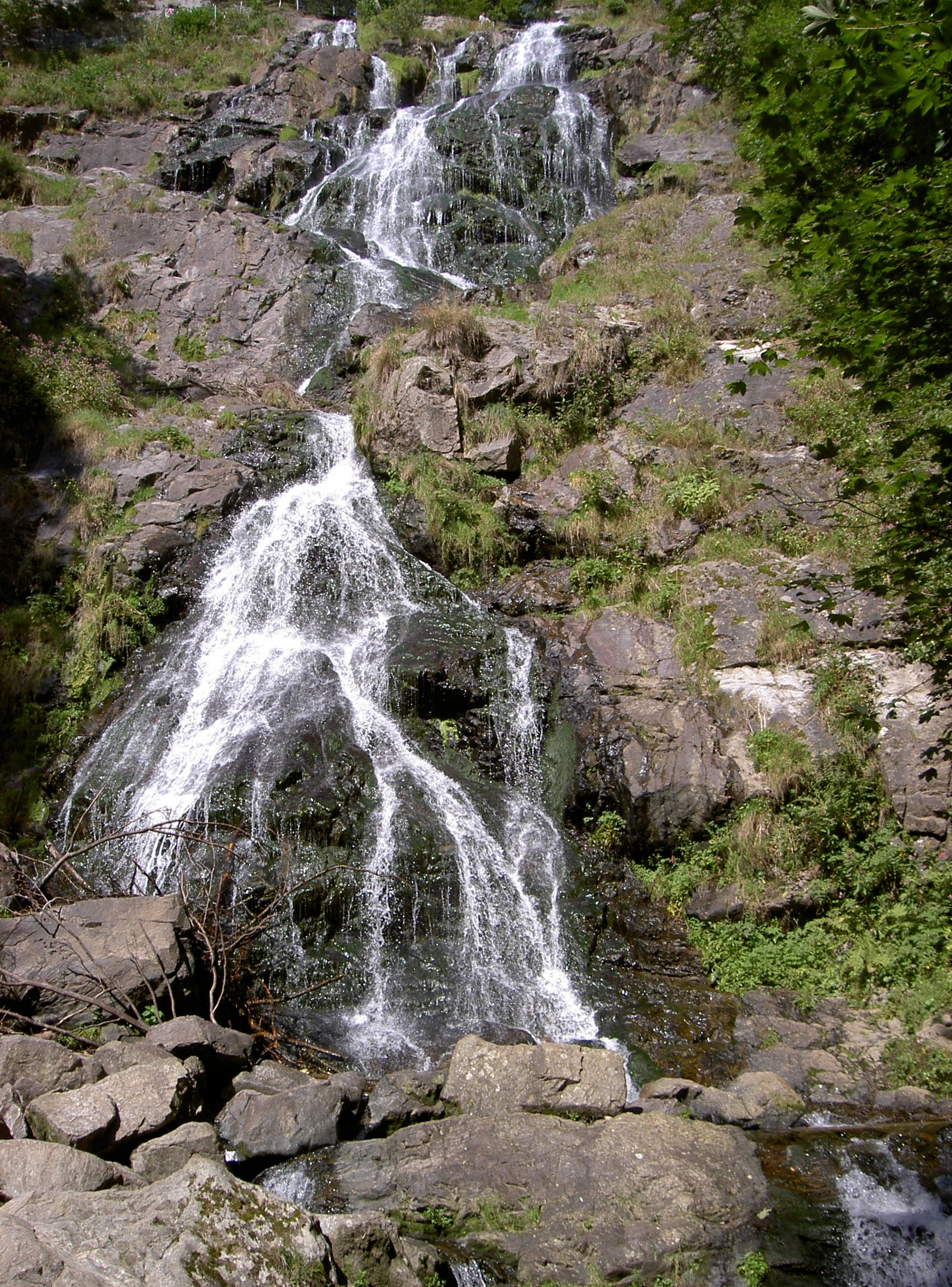
Todtnauer Waterfall

Todtnau waterfall is located between Todtnau and Aftersteg, where the waterfalls to a depth of 97 meters. More waterfalls are located in other parts of the Wiesen valley: the Angenbach near Häg-Ehrsberg and the Schuhlochbachtal near Atzenbach (Atzenbach waterfall). Moreover, the longest toboggan run in Germany is located in Todtnau (3500 meters) as well as one of the longest all-weather toboggan runs (2900 meters) in Germany and a downhill mountain bike route. The integral nature reserve "Utzenfluh" was created in 1940, in Utzenfeld. Further downstream, the Wiesental textile museum was opened in 1996 in Zell. The museum gives an insight into the everyday life and history of this important former industrial area.

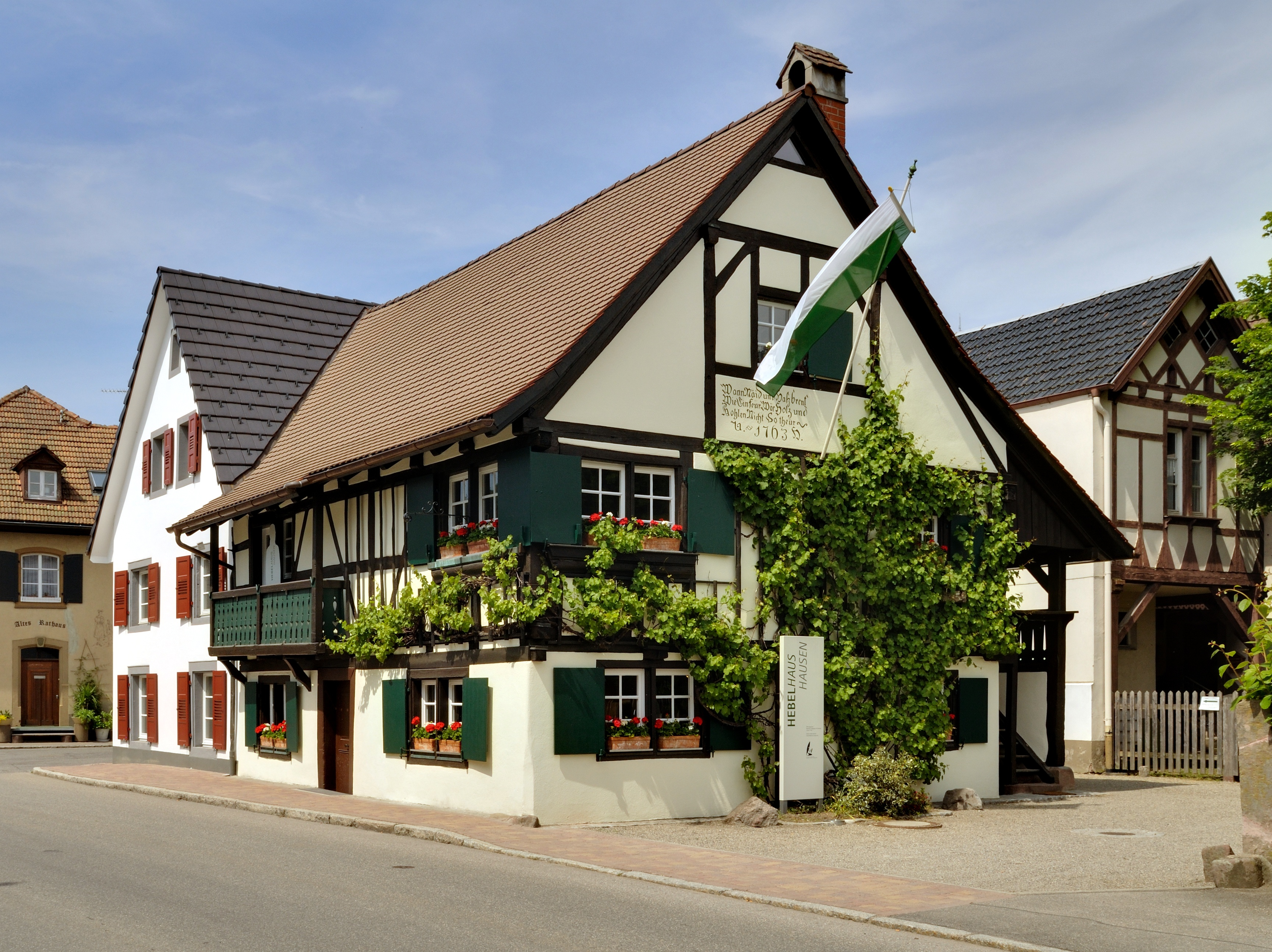
The "Hebelhuus", the home of Johann Peter Hebel

The Hebelhaus, in which Johann Peter Hebel spent a part of his childhood is located in Hausen. It is now a literature museum. Other museums can be found in Schopfheim: a technical museum with a collection of Hot metal typesetting machines, the city museum and a teddybear museum in Ortsteil Gersbach. A reconstruction of a Baroque fortifications in the Black Forest can also be found in Gersbach. Moreover, Gersbach won the title "Bundesgolddorf" in the "our village has future- our village must be nice" (Unser Dorf hat Zukunft, Unser Dorf soll schöner werden – Unser Dorf hat Zukunft) competition.

Above a Lörrach district, Haagen, Rötteln Castle is visible from afar. The ruins of the castle, which is open all year long, are considered one of the biggest of its kind in the entire South Baden region. This was also the domicile of the former Lords of the Wiesental. Numerous castle ruins can be found in Wieslet (Burgruine Rotenburg), Raitbach (Ruine Turmhölzle), Burgruine Burgholz and Zell (Ruine Henschenberg). A Roman farm, which is older than the castle ruins, can be found in Brombach. The foundation walls were excavated in 1981. Castle Brombach is also located here. It was first mentioned in 1294 and, the city administration has been located there since the sixties.

=== Famous people from Wiesental ===
The famous Alemannic-Baden poet Johann Peter Hebel was born in 1760 in Basel and lived in Basel and Hausen during his childhood. The language, the landscape and the way of life of the Wiesen valley highly impressed the young Hebel and so he incorporated these into his Alemannic poems. The well-known writer (and philosopher) Max Picard was also born in Schopfheim in the Wiesen valley. Schopfheim was the homeland and birthplace of the Roman Catholic priest and pacifist Max Josef Metzger, who was murdered by the National Socialists. Constanze Mozart (born Weber) was also born in Zell. The football players Sebastian Deisler and Melanie Behringer, as well as the coach Ottmar Hitzfeld, were born in Lörrach. The trainer of the Germany national football team Joachim Löw comes from Schönau, and Karl Nessler, the inventor of the Perm (hairstyle) came from Todtnau.

== Literature ==
- Theodor Humpert: Das Wiesental. Eine heimatliche Wirtschaftskunde. Bühl 1920.
- Theodor Humpert: Der Amtsbezirk Schönau im Wiesental. Schönau 1920.
- Landesarchivdirektion Baden-Württemberg, Landkreis Lörrach (Hrsg.): Der Landkreis Lörrach, Band I (Aitern bis Inzlingen), Jan Thorbecke Verlag Sigmaringen 1993, ISBN 3-7995-1353-1
- Clemens Fabrizio: Links und rechts der Wiese. Ansichtskarten von ANNO DAZUMAL, Schopfheim 1980
- Hans O. Steiger, Werner Beetschen: Im Tal der Wiese. Zwischen Schwarzwald und Basler Rheinknie, Basel 2000 ISBN 3-9521893-0-8
