= Gersbach =

Gersbach may refer to:

- Gersbach (Schopfheim), a nationally recognized resort and district of Schopfheim

== People with the surname ==
- Carl Gersbach
- Melody Gersbach (1985–2010)
- Alex Gersbach (Australian footballer)
