= Wiesental bridge =

Bridge in the town of Lörrach, Germany

Wiesental bridge Wiesentalbrücke
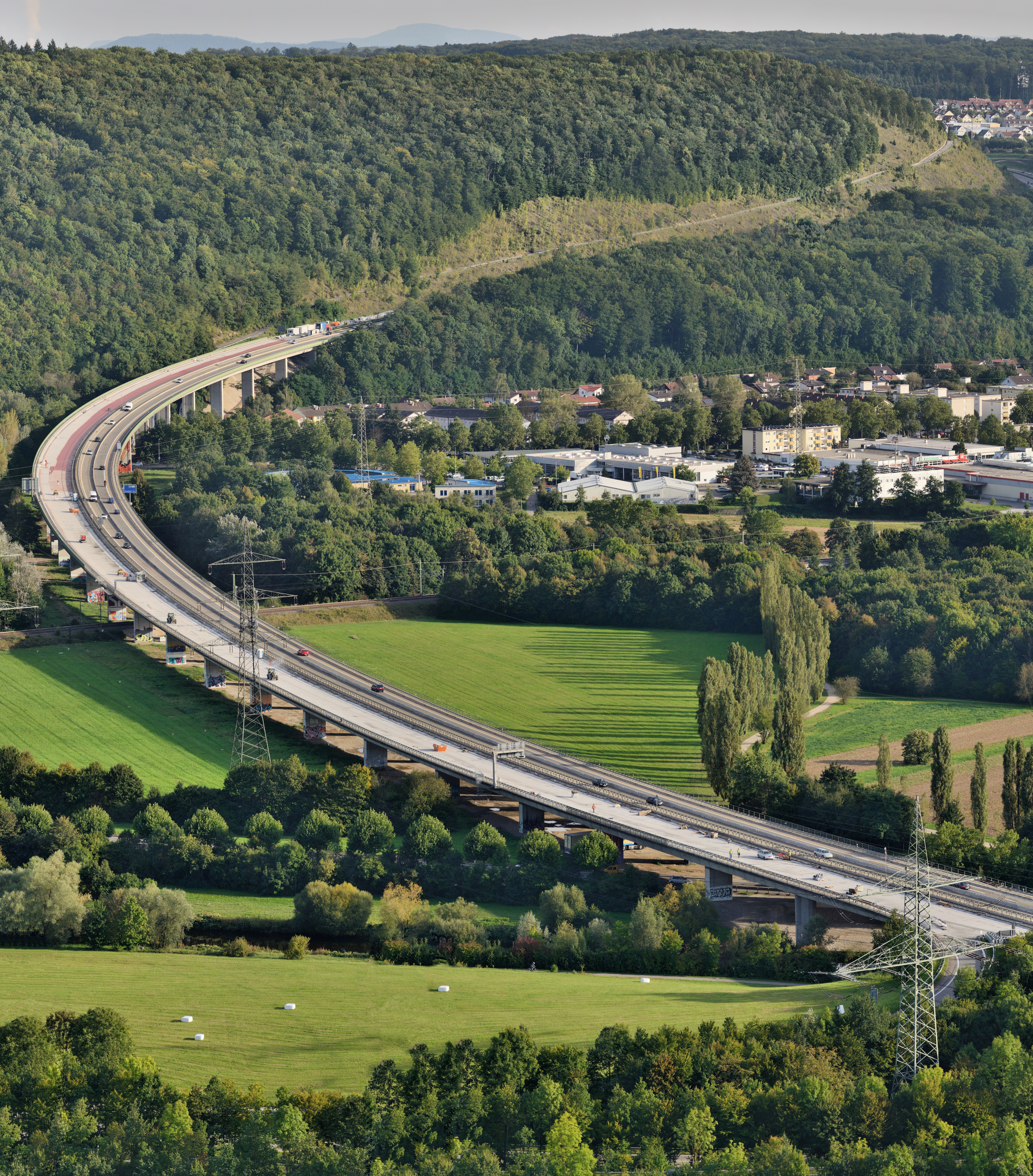
- Wiesental bridge from the north
- Coordinates: 47°37′47.4″N 7°40′36.5″E
- Locale: Lörrach

Characteristics
- Total length: 1201.42 meters
- Width: 27 meters
- Height: 32 meters

History
- Construction start: December 1979
- Construction cost: 39.1 million DM (Purchasing power 2021: 39.64 Mio. €)
- Opened: April 12, 1983

Location
- Interactive map of Wiesental bridge

The Wiesental Bridge in the town of Lörrach is the third longest road bridge in Baden-Württemberg at 1201 meters and is also one of the longest in Germany. It is part of the A 98 between Luckepass and Homburg Forest and crosses the river Wiese, the federal highway 317, the Grütt Landscape Park and the Wiesental railroad from north to south. The four-lane highway route is curved in plan and rises to the south towards the slope. As Lörrach is located in the highest German earthquake zone, the structure was designed to be earthquake-proof. Since it was opened to traffic in 1983, the Wiesental Bridge has continued the A 98 in an easterly direction. An automatic counting station at the east portal measures the traffic volume on the bridge. In 2020, around 23,000 vehicles used the structure every day, with heavy goods vehicles accounting for a good 10%. Most of the piers of the Wiesental Bridge were officially approved for legal graffiti by the city of Lörrach in summer 2010. Since then, the pillar images have become known nationwide as the Bridge Gallery.

== History ==
Based on an expert opinion for the 1965 traffic plan, the demand arose to build a highway along the High Rhine on the German side, the section of which was begun from Märkt with the Weil am Rhein highway intersection to Rheinfelden in the 1970s. In December 1966, the planning approval process began for the area around Binzen with the help of the B 317, construction of which began in late summer 1968. The section of road through Lörrach to cross the Wiesental valley was originally planned as an underground route, i.e. the A 98 would have run under the Wiesental railroad. In October 1970, the Federal Ministry of Transport decided on the general alignment of the High Rhine highway, and in the same month the planning approval decision was issued for the construction section between Lucke and Waidhof.

It was not until the revised plans in 1976 that a viaduct was planned to cross the Wiesental at an elevated position. For cost reasons, it was initially envisaged that the bridge would only have one lane The structural core of the "Lörrach Bypass" section was the Wiesental Bridge, which carries the freeway over the Wiesental valley near Lörrach and thus simultaneously fulfils the function of a bypass to get traffic out of the town. In the subsequent planning process, it was determined that the cost savings from the earthworks in the cuttings in Rötteln and Homburg Forest were not significant. A one-way expansion would have significantly impaired the ongoing traffic, so that the decision was made to fully expand the Wiesental Bridge, contrary to the original plans.

=== Construction ===
Once the planning approval had been granted in July 1976, preliminary earthworks between Wiesental and Waidhof began in early 1977. Before work began, burial mounds were found in the Homburg Forest, which first had to be excavated. In addition, extensive sinkholes had to be filled in. The excavation in the Homburg section amounted to 1.3 million cubic meters. Construction work on the freeway section in Lörrach itself began in spring 1978. During the foundation work near the Haagen commercial canal, two stone cannonballs were found in 1978, which were attributed to a presumed enemy defence of the rulers of Rötteln Castle. The objects found are now in the Dreiländermuseum.

After the Wiesental Bridge consortium, led by the construction company Bilfinger and Berger, was awarded the contract for the construction work in November 1979, construction of the Wiesental Bridge began from the south in December 1979. During the construction phase, increased safety requirements had to be met, as the bridge crosses a 300-hectare water protection area and the city of Lörrach has extensive infrastructure for the municipal groundwater supply in Grüttpark.

For this purpose, the bridge was designed in such a way that the surface water is drained away without damage using longitudinal pipes in the box girder of the superstructure. During the construction work, the construction site was connected to the municipal water supply system, parking and workshop areas were sealed and an oil weir was set up. The embankments, including the drainage troughs, were sealed with strong plastic sheeting in the entire roadway area. The manholes and pipelines had to meet special requirements in terms of impermeability. The area of the Wiesental bridge was additionally secured with a 1.5 meter thick sealing layer to prevent any disruption to the water supply in the event of a serious accident.

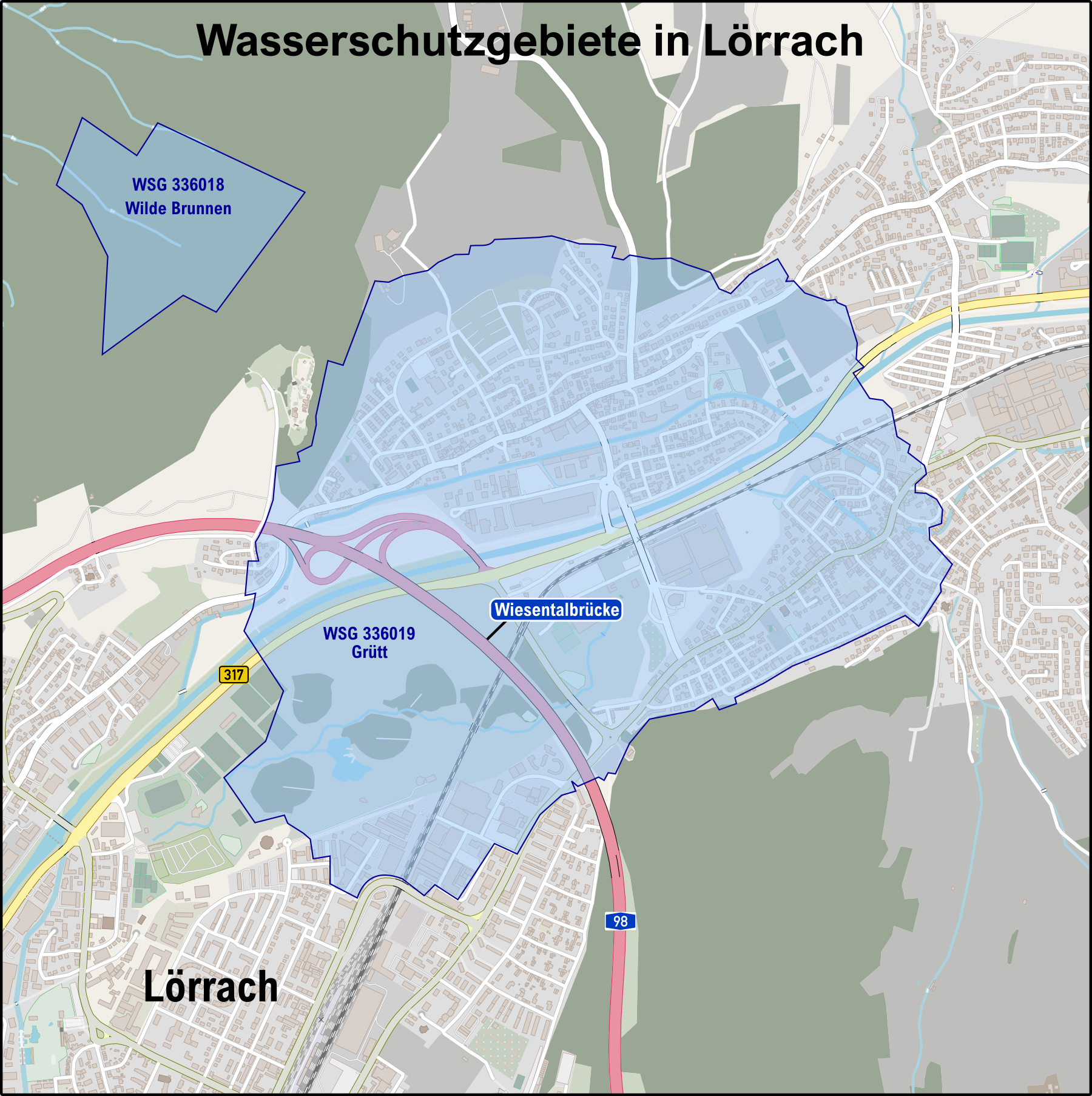
Wiesental bridge and water protection areas in Lörrach

As is usual for highway bridges in Germany, the bridge was built by the Federal Republic of Germany. The contracting authority was the road construction office in Bad Säckingen, which transferred the construction management to the town of Lörrach. The bridge and civil engineering department of the Freiburg Regional Council was responsible for the technical supervision and the tender design. In addition to Bilfinger and Berger, the Wiesentalbrücke consortium included Gustav Strumpf from Rheinfelden and Locher & Cie from Switzerland. The structural engineering work was carried out by the engineering firm Schmidt + Partner from Basel. Leonhardt, Andrä und Partner from Stuttgart was entrusted with checking the structural analysis and design.

After laying the bridge piers, the consortium concreted the first span of the box girder in October 1980 and was able to complete the superstructure by July 1982. The formwork was built on a feed scaffold. The scaffolding girders required for the construction were moved using a hydraulic bearing.

The highway bridge was officially inaugurated for public traffic on April 11 and opened on April 12, 1983, after months of delays. In addition to the mayor at the time, Egon Hugenschmidt, the opening was also attended by District President Norbert Nothhelfer, the Federal Minister of Transport at the time, Werner Dollinger, and the State Minister of Economics, Rudolf Eberle. A schoolgirl from Lörrach cut the ribbon with the federal colors to mark the opening of the section, and then a convoy of cars several kilometers long with political celebrities moved across the opened section of freeway from the freeway junction Mitte in the direction of Waidhof. At the time of the opening, the Wiesental Bridge in Lörrach was the longest road bridge in Baden-Württemberg.

=== Since opening ===
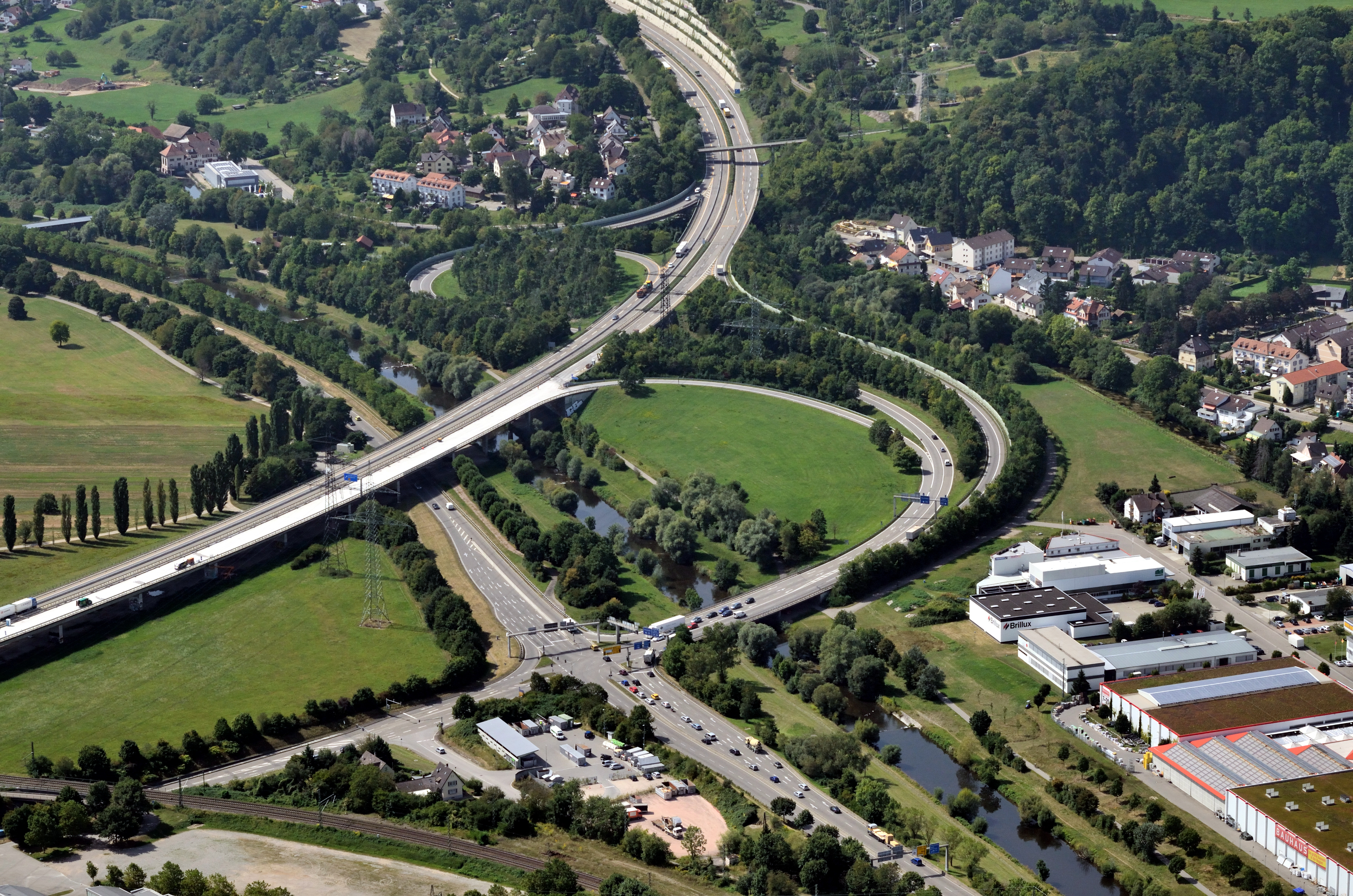
Aerial view of the bridge and highway junction

Since 2005, the Federal Highway Research Institute has been systematically recording traffic volumes at the southwest portal of the Wiesental Bridge using an automatic counting station.

In 2008, the Wiesental Bridge was renovated at a cost of one million euros. In 2010, the city of Lörrach officially released the surface of the bridge piers for legal graffiti, known as the Bridge Gallery.

In the summer months of 2012, the top of the bridge was extensively renovated at a cost of around two million euros. One lane was completely closed at a time and traffic was diverted to the other. Among other things, the damaged drainage spouts in the roadway slab on the top of the bridge were replaced so that the de-icing salt water on the underside could drain away easily and not damage the prestressed concrete. In addition, the old sealing layer of the road surface, which was now 30 years old, was renewed. This involved demolishing 12,000 square meters of the old bridge deck.

The bridge underwent further maintenance work in 2020.

== Description ==
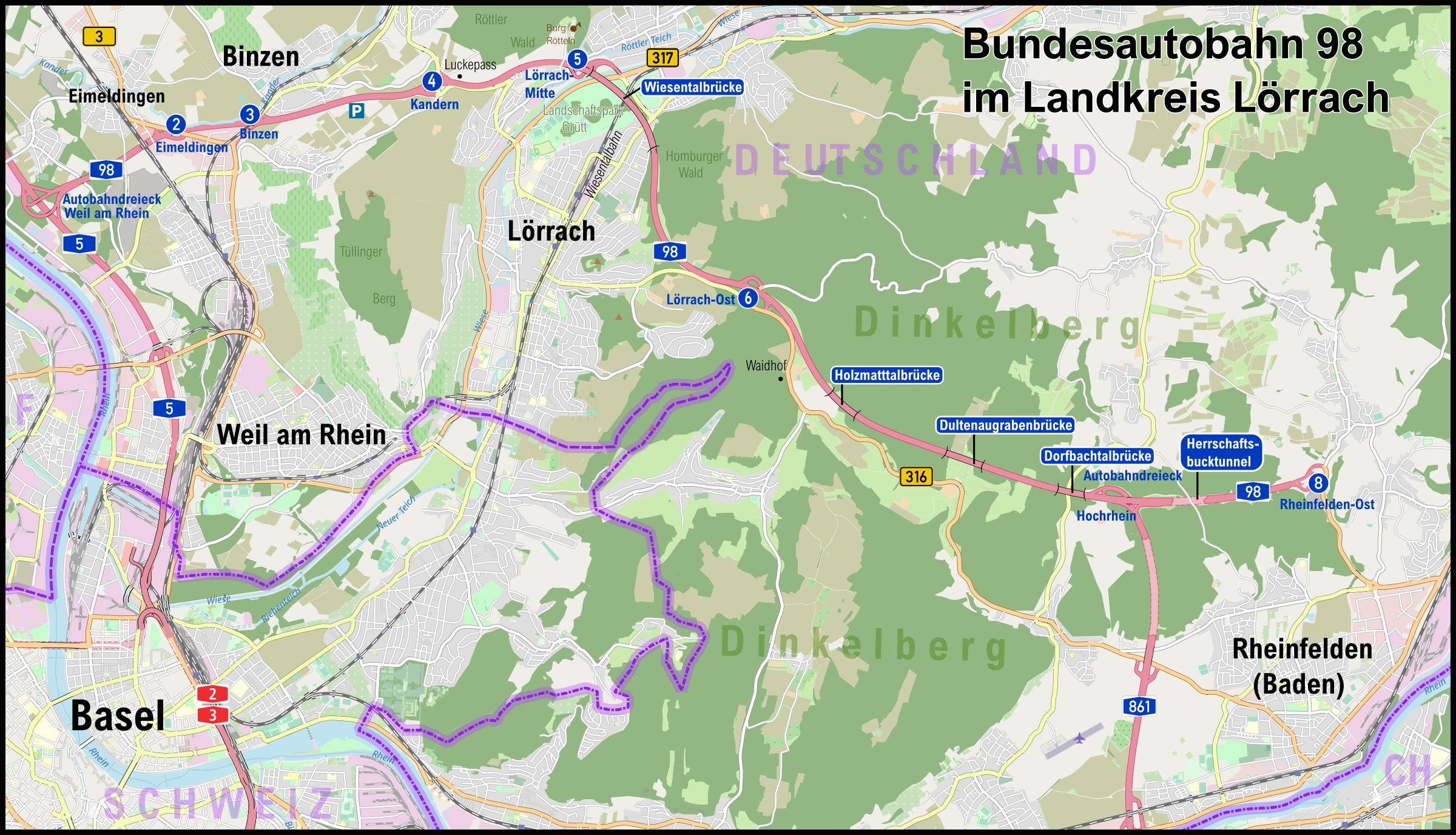
Route of the A 98 highway in the district of Lörrach with the most important traffic structures

=== Location ===
The 1201 meter long Wiesental Bridge spans the Wiesental valley near Lörrach and leads the A 98 freeway in a wide arc from the Luckepass downhill to Lörrach, before gaining height again, taking the route over the Homburg Forest, which belongs to the Dinkelberg, and on to the Waidhof Pass. Along the valley, seen from Lörrach, the bridge describes a concave curve and lies between 6 and 24 meters above the Wiesental. In the northwest, the north and south bridges begin in the valley basin at an altitude of 299 m NHN and run south to 339 m NHN (south bridge) and the north bridge at 335 m NHN.

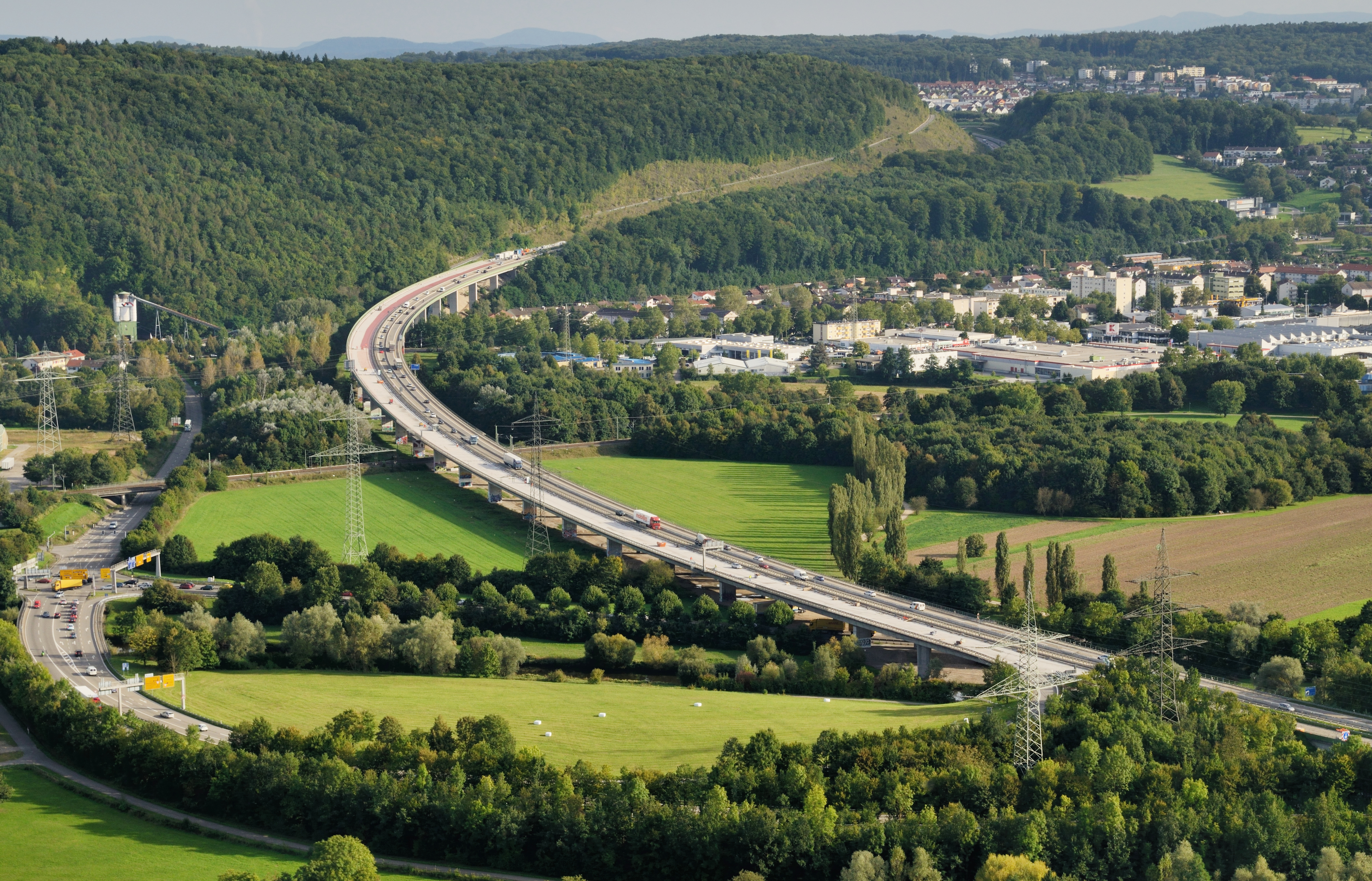
General view with connecting bridges of the Lörrach-Mitte junction

Around 900 meters of the bridge structure run in the narrow water protection area of the city of Lörrach. To ensure that traffic can easily negotiate these ascending and descending curves, the transverse inclination of the bridge varies between 4 and 6%. The access and exit ramps to the B 317 federal highway are located in the north-western part of the bridge, which passes underneath between piers 3 and 4. Junction 5 is called Lörrach-Mitte and is directly connected to the bridge structure via a curved ramp construction. The intersection of the junction's entrance and exit with the B 317 is known as the Hasenloch junction and is considered a supra-regional traffic junction in the district. The Wiese river between pillars 1 and 2, the Wiesentalbahn railroad line between piers 12 and 13 and Brombacher Straße between pillars 22 and 23, which used to be part of the B 317, are also underpassed.

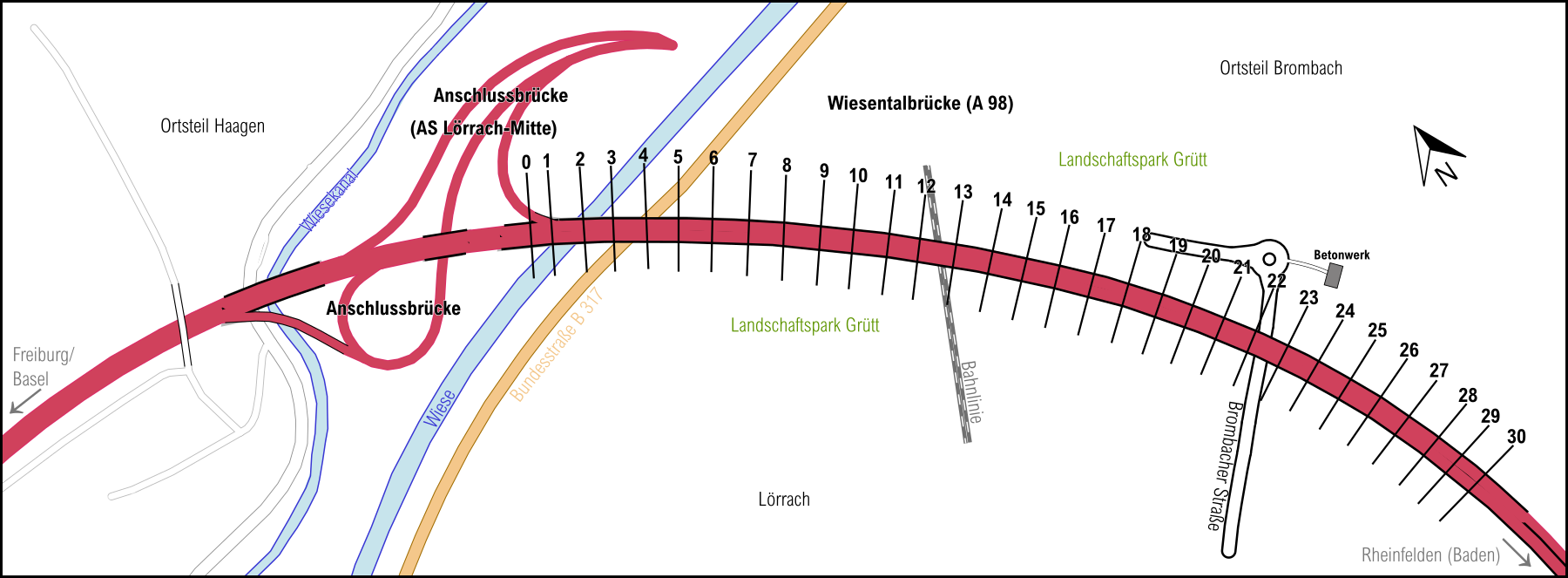
Plan view and site plan of the Wiesental Bridge with pillar position numbering

=== Foundation and abutment ===
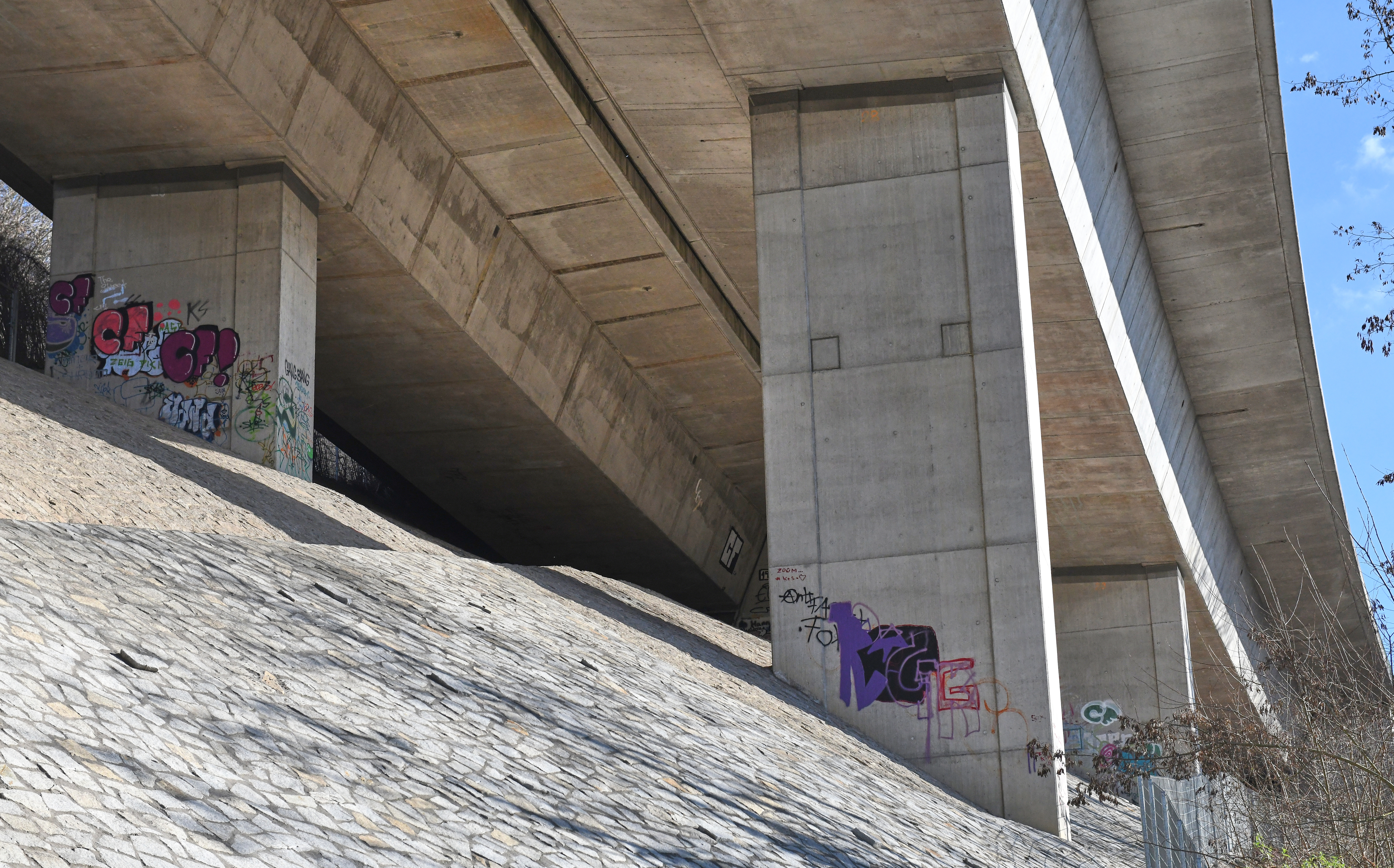
Box girders with overhangs over the sloping terrain not far from the south-eastern abutment

With the exception of pillar pair 26, the entire Wiesental bridge has a shallow foundation. This shallow foundation is possible because the gravel soil in the Wiesental valley rises to the surface and the permissible soil pressure of 3.5 kg/cm^{2} is not exceeded. Due to slope debris and irregular subsoil conditions, pillar pair 26 was constructed as a pile foundation. Each pillar stands on four large bored piles, each measuring 120 centimeters in diameter. The piles, which project into the rock at a depth of between 13 and 18 meters, stand on a limestone cliff. Pillars 27 to 29 are located on the rising slope of the Dinkelberg. As the mountain has layers in the rock parallel to the slope at this point, larger and more complicated excavation work was required. Both abutments of the Wiesental Bridge are designed as box abutments. The abutment in the north-west is directed against the embankment fills and slopes. There are further bridge structures in this area, which form the approaches and departures of the Wiesental Bridge. In the area of the south-eastern abutment, which is located on the slope, the support of the superstructures is offset by one bay due to the inclination of the terrain. In addition to a 45-metre-long wing wall, there is a connecting wall between the roadway axis and the two abutment halves. The abutments with the retaining walls also have shallow foundations.

=== Pillar system ===
With a height of up to 32 meters, the Wiesental Bridge forms a viaduct over the Wiesental valley. It consists of two prestressed concrete superstructures and 59 bridge spans, each with a box girder cross-section, and is founded on 57 pillars. The superstructures rest on two new pot bearings at each pillar; in the area of the river Wiese, only one new pot bearing supports the superstructure. The pillars have strength class C30/37 (former designation according to the old DIN 1045 standard: B 35) and are relatively slender at 1.80 × 4.60 meters. The wall thickness varies between 30 and 35 centimeters. The pillars are visually structured with pilaster strips. The Wiesental Bridge consists of two substructures, each with its own bridge pillars. The continuous girders of the north bridge run over 17 spans, those of the south bridge over 12 and 13 spans respectively. For the sake of clarity, however, the pillars are not numbered individually, but the north and south bridges are numbered together. The numbering starts at 0 on the north-west ramp and increases after each span until it reaches 30 on the south ramp at Homburger Wald, which is part of the Dinkelberg. The numbering scheme can be found in both construction sketches.

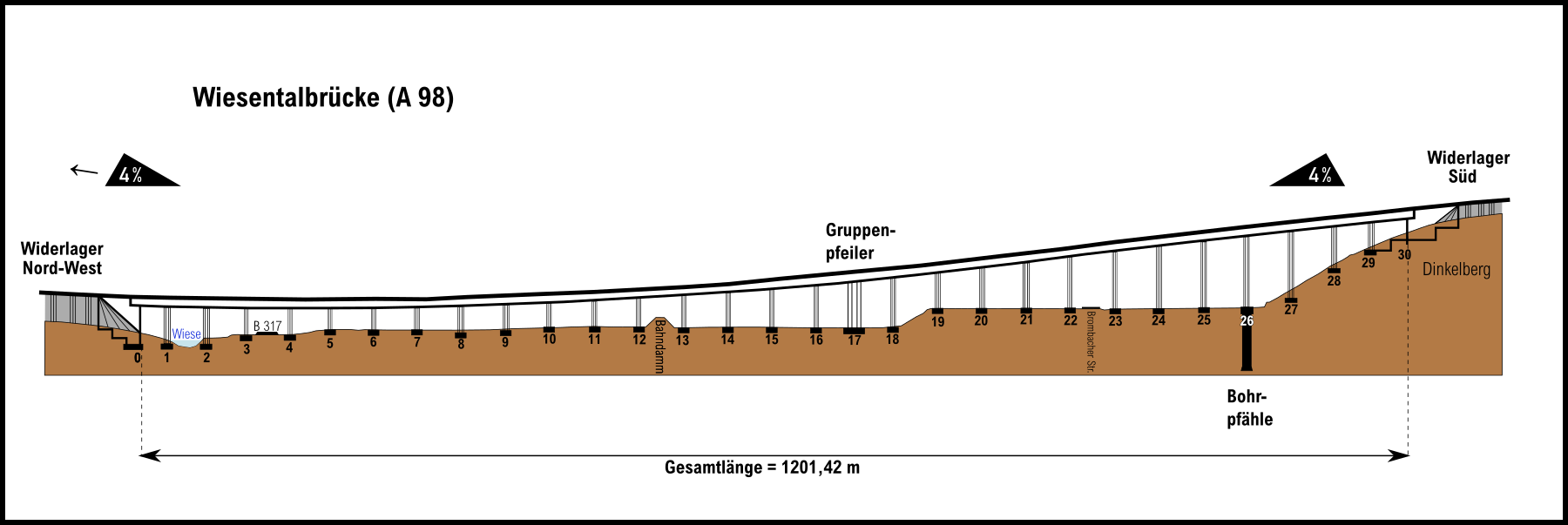
Longitudinal section of the Wiesental Bridge from north-west to south

With the exception of the end spans, where the span widths vary between 26 and 37 meters, the span widths are generally 42 meters. The bridge superstructure is divided at the so-called group pillar (position 17). The 18-meter-wide pillar 17 is the only one that supports both bridges. The bridge superstructure was divided in order to achieve smaller displacement paths for the individual transition structures. The fixed point pillars of the four bridges are each located in the middle. Four pillars each form a fixed point group. Due to the relatively large distances between the fixed point pillars and the abutments or the group pillars, displacement paths occur at the transitions, which are around 40 centimetres at the abutment and around 80 centimetres at the group pillar.

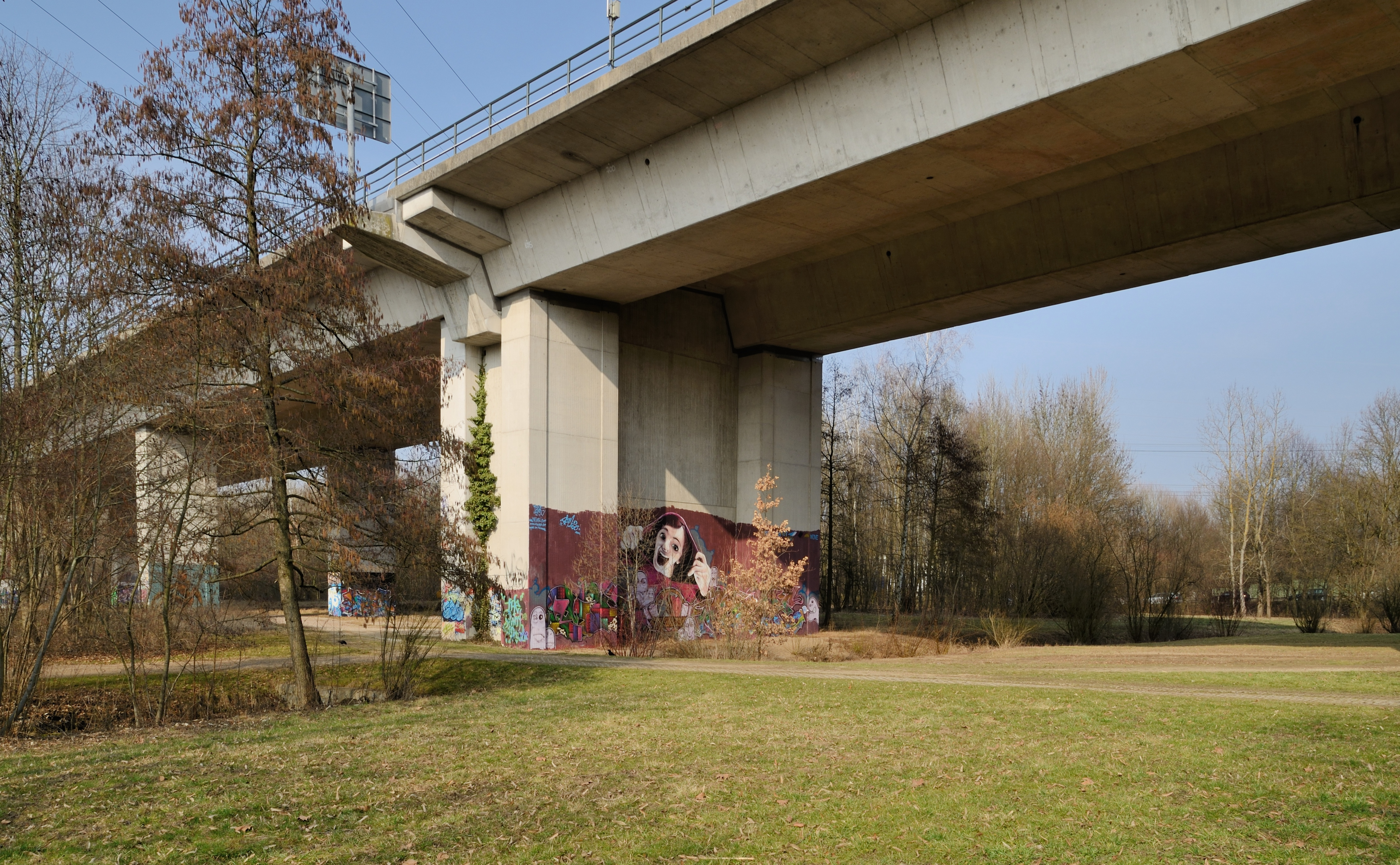
The continuous group pillar (position 17), in the background the paired supporting pillars

Each pillar carries a box girder superstructure, the top of which carries the roadway of the Wiesental Bridge. Each of these elements was cast in one piece from concrete of strength class C35/45 (formerly: B 45) and has a volume of around 350 cubic meters. To construct this component, work was carried out from front to back so that the concreting joint was closed at the end of the process.

=== Superstructure and general information ===
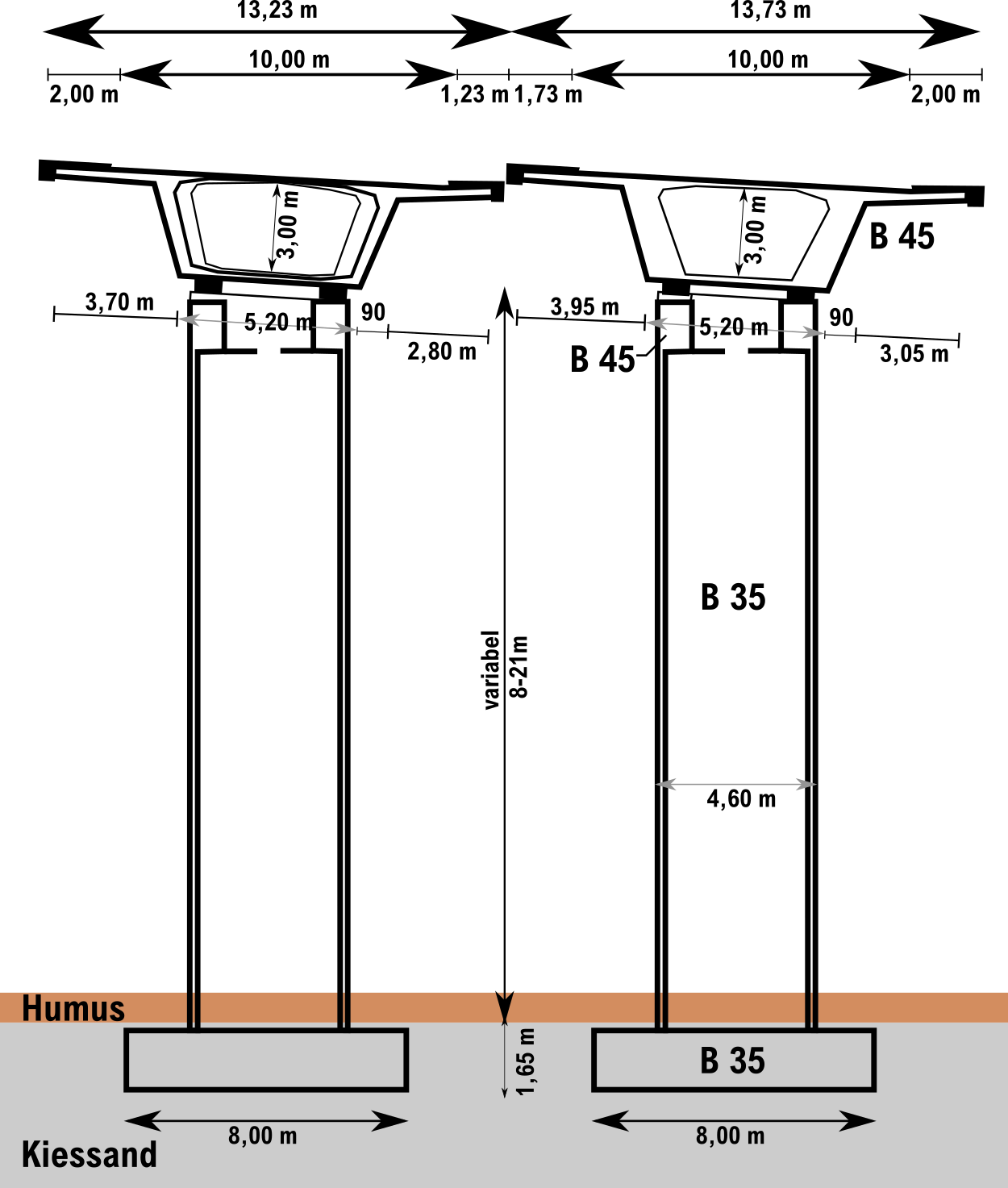
Superstructure and pillar cross-section

In plan, the Wiesental Bridge runs in a rectilinear curve with a radius of 1000 and 1900 meters. In elevation, the bridge lies in a trough with a radius of curvature of 16,000 meters. The maximum longitudinal gradient is 4%, the transverse gradient is between 4 and 6%. The resulting slope of the superstructure is 7.2%. For this reason, great importance was attached to a particularly stable structure and good insulation. For this purpose, a 1-centimetre-thick sand asphalt layer with a 3-centimetre-thick protective layer and a 3.5-centimetre-thick surface layer was laid.

The traffic loads correspond to bridge class 60 and military class 50/100. The girder height of the road surface is 3 meters. The bridge is fully prestressed in the longitudinal direction for the loads it has to bear. The strand tendons in the webs overlap in the support area. These are anchored to the pilaster strips on both sides. This is to ensure a favorable stress distribution. The roadway superstructures of the bridge have a cross-section length including the edge limits of 13.2 and 13.7 meters, making the total bridge width 27 meters.

All of the bridge's cavities are accessible and illuminated. This means that the pillar heads and the bearings are also easily accessible for maintenance and repair work.

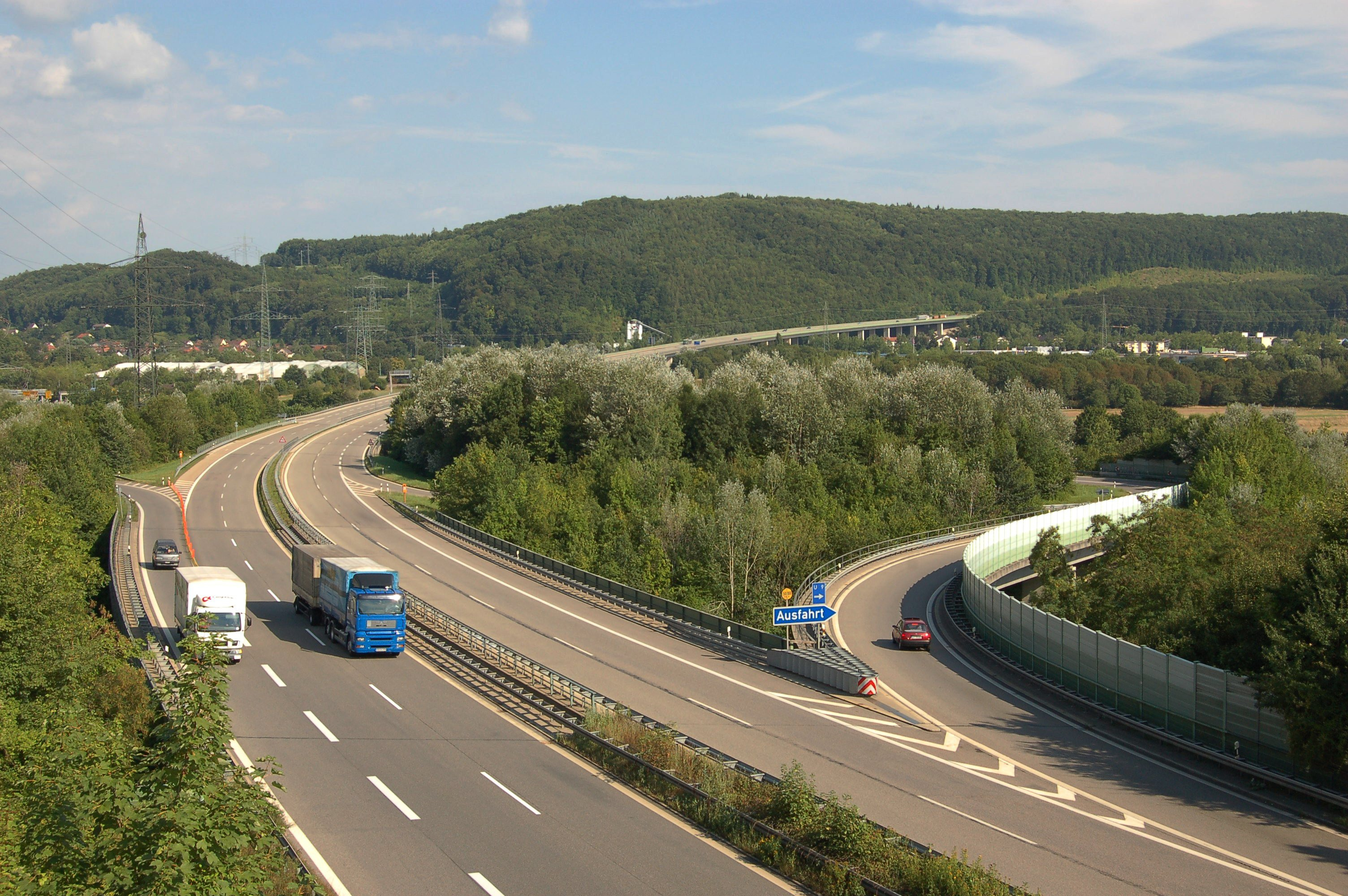
View of the road surface at the Lörrach-Mitte highway exit

Due to its location and dimensions, the bridge has two crosswind indicators. Both windsocks are located not far from the respective ends of the bridge and are positioned centrally between the two bridge structures. Absorbent noise barriers about one meter high are installed on both sides in the area of the residential buildings.

The main dimensions of the Wiesental Bridge are:

Substructures:

1. Concrete 14,000 m³

2. Steel reinforced concrete components 1000 t

Superstructures:

1. Concrete 20,500 m³

2. Steel reinforced concrete components 2050 t

3. Pre-stressed steel (longitudinal) 470 t

3. Prestressed steel (transverse) 190 t

Roadway area 24,400 m^{2}

Superstructure area 31,000 m^{2}

=== Bridge-Gallery ===
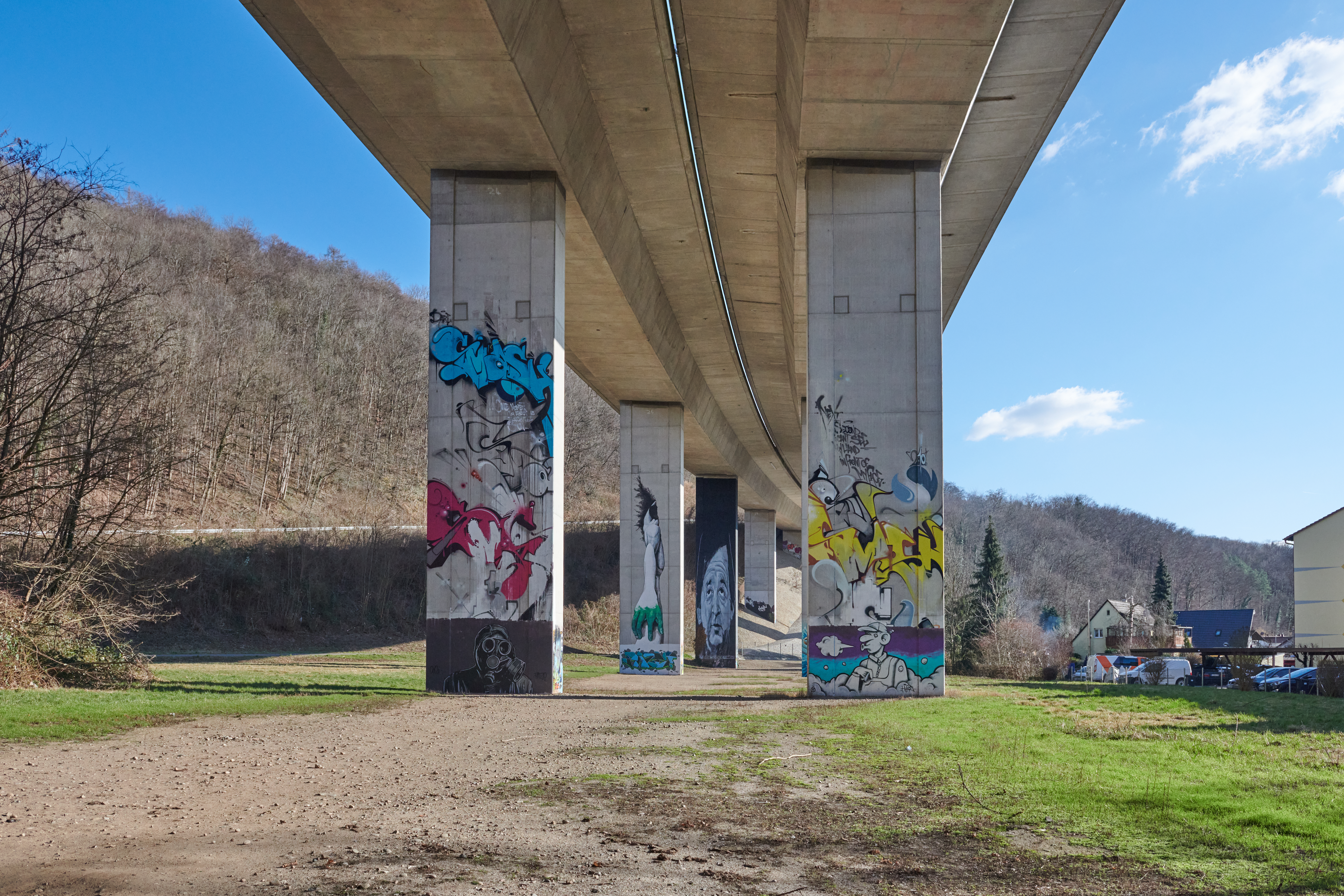
The Bridge Gallery at pillar pairs 24 to 28

Since the beginning of August 2010, the city of Lörrach has approved the use of most of the pillars of the Wiesental bridge for legal graffiti. The use of graffiti was approved by the authorities in July 2010.

In principle, pillar pairs 5 to 22 are officially available; the numbering follows the official numbering of the bridge structure. In the case of pillar pairs 3 to 4, for which no approval has been given, the potential danger for this work is too high due to the adjacent federal highway 3. Pillar pairs 23 to 27 are reserved for school clubs, youth work or competitions. A total of 18 pillar pairs have been approved. For clear identification, the letters a to d are assigned to each of the four sides of the double pillars in an anti-clockwise direction. Pillar 17 (group pillar) is an exception, as it is the only one that stretches across the entire width of the bridge.

Each of the 68 concrete walls has a painting surface of around 16 square meters. In addition, there are side walls of around 6 square meters each. This results in a total usable area of 1,500 square meters of painting space, which can optionally be extended to more than 2,200 square meters by special arrangement. A similar concept of a bridge gallery is known from Anderlecht-Neerpede, where a park-like area with graffiti art has been created under a Belgian highway bridge. The concept is unique in Germany so far (year: 2024).

Since its inception, the Bridge Gallery on the Wiesentalbrücke in Lörrach has become a popular hot spot for the graffiti scene from all over Europe. The open-air gallery is increasingly mentioned in travel guides and collections on special places in Lörrach. The city of Lörrach offers guided tours.

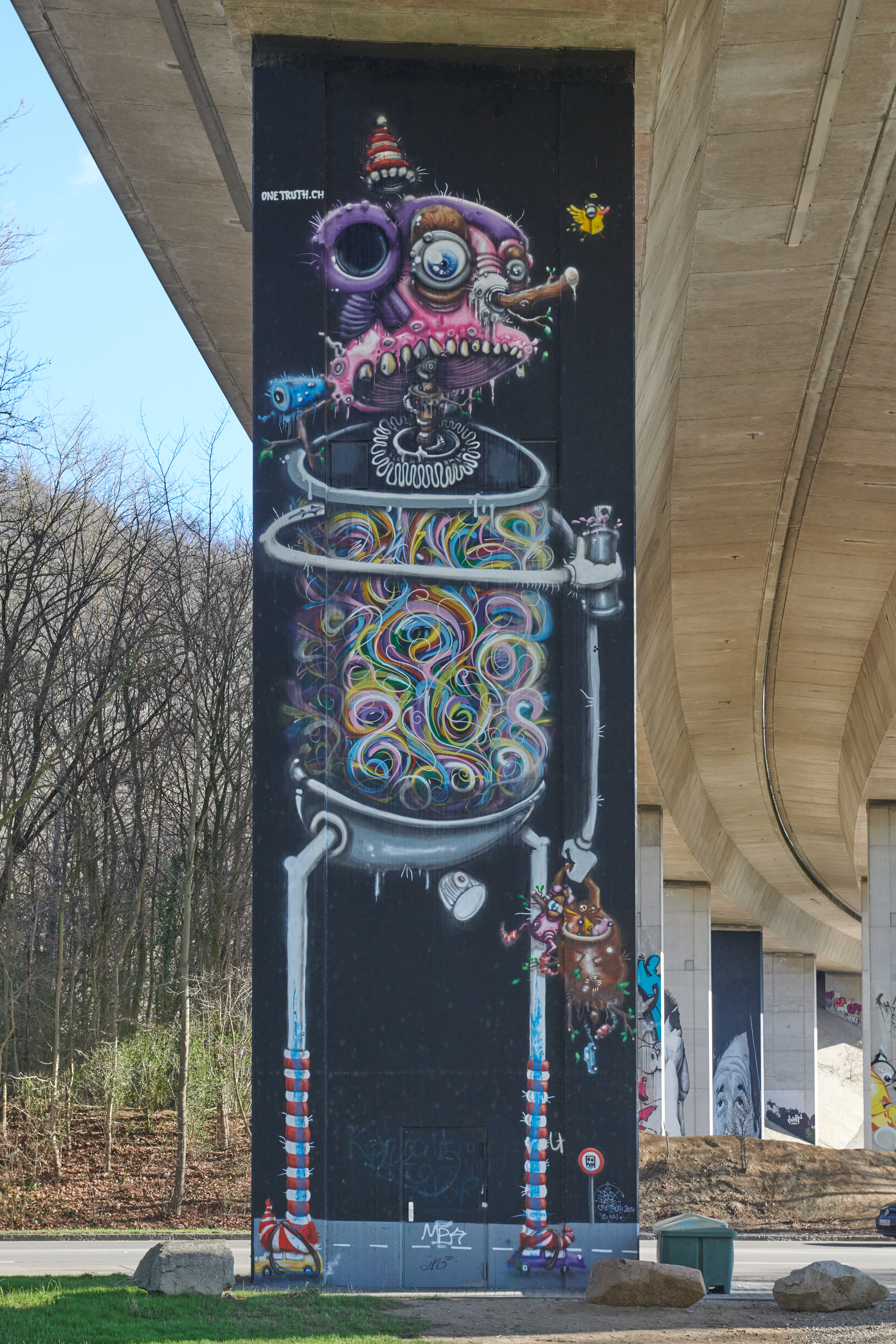
Large graffiti on the north pillar 22

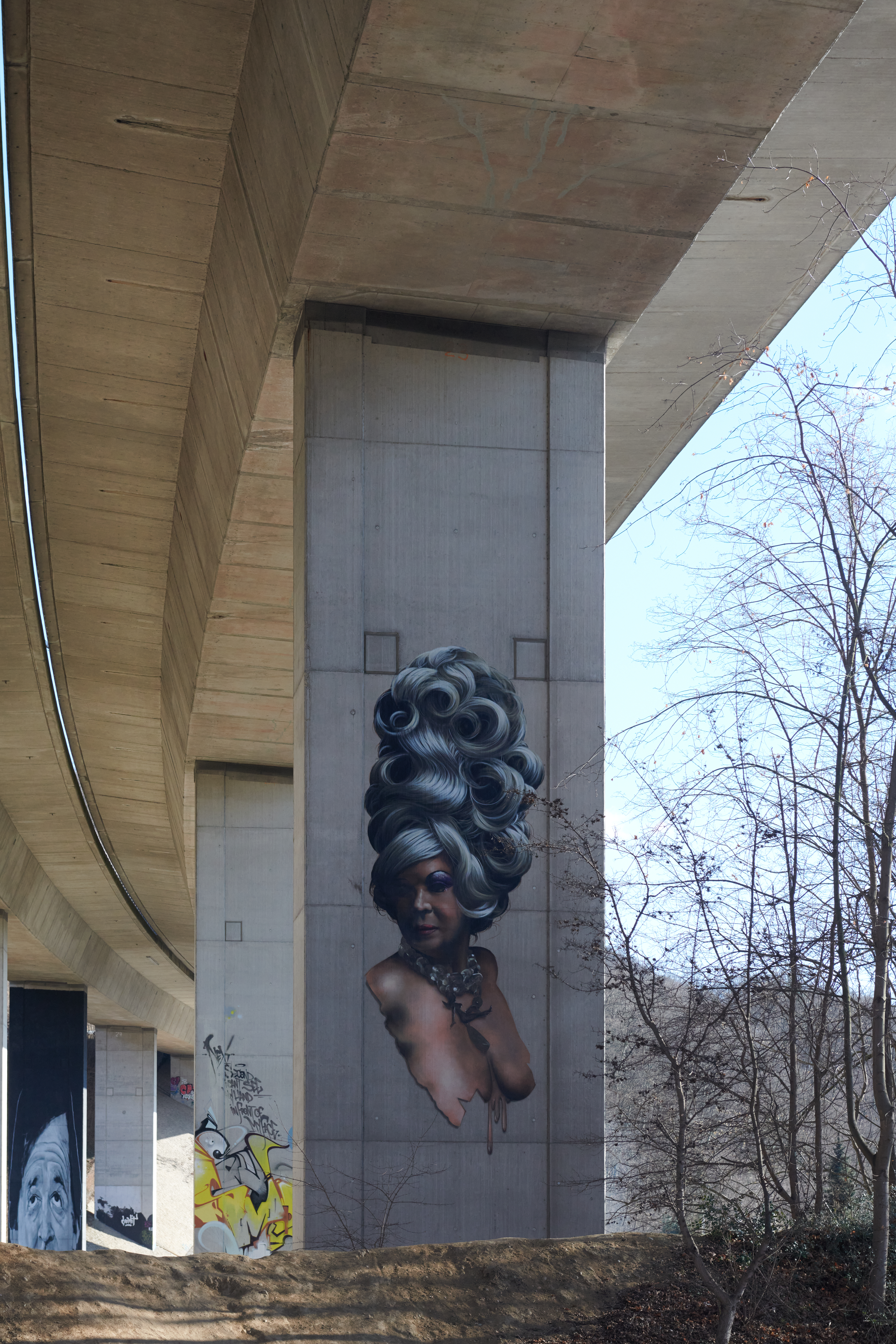
Large graffiti on the north pillar 23

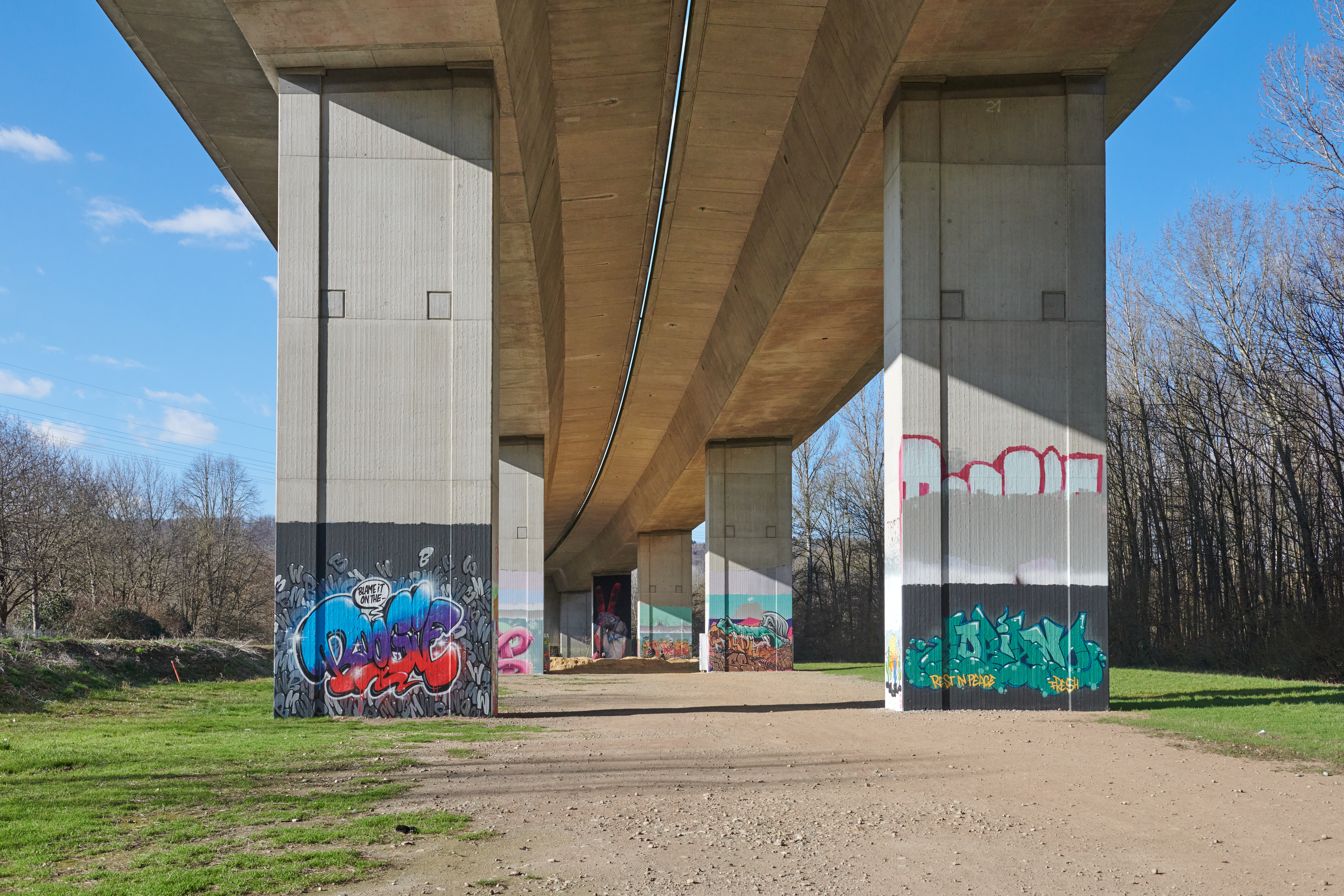
Pillars 21 to 18 (view to the west)

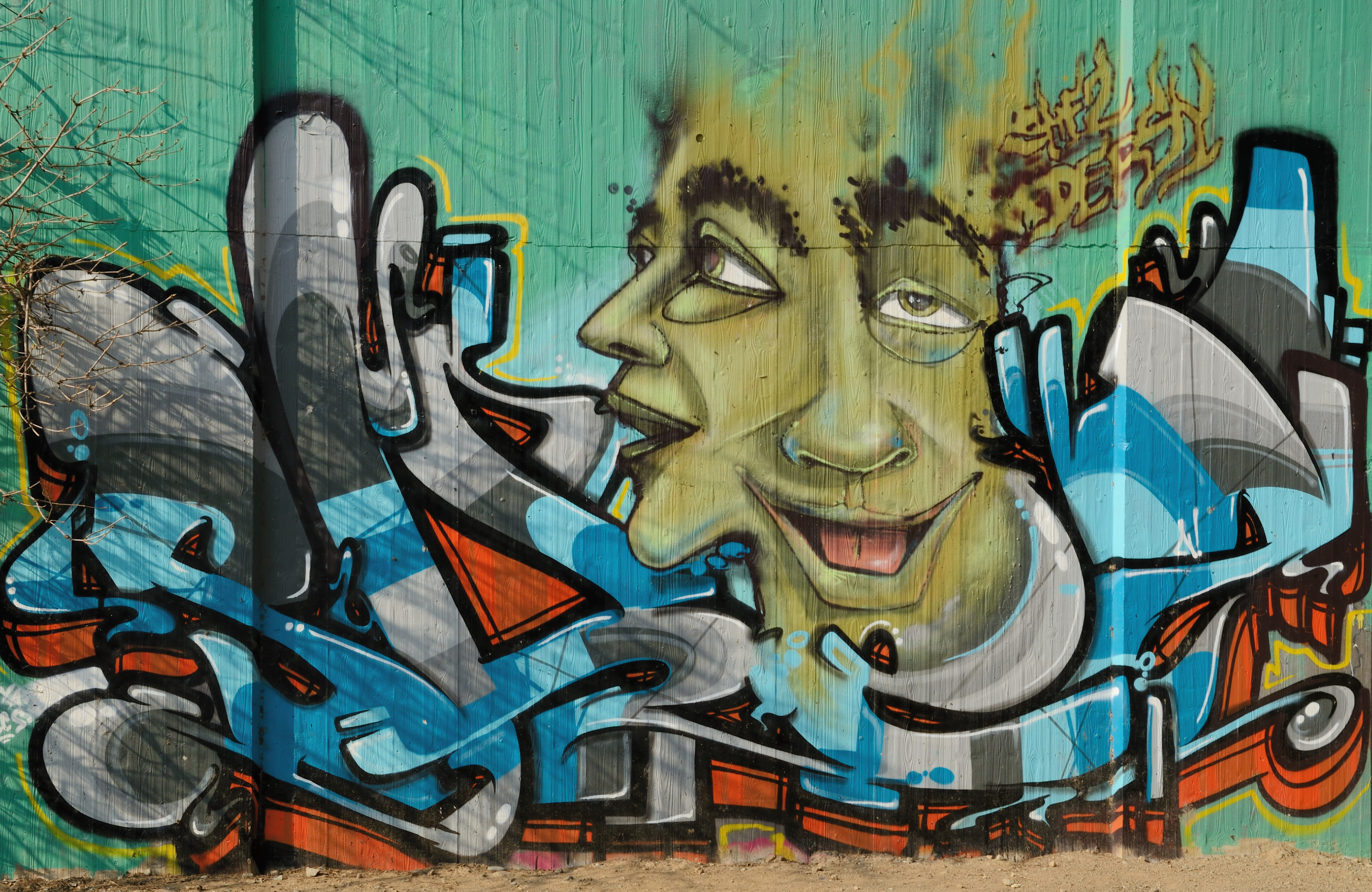
Graffiti on the south pillar 18

=== Traffic volume ===
Since 2005, an automatic counting station of the Federal Highway Research Institute (BASt) at the south-western portal of the Wiesental Bridge has been recording the traffic volume. The official BASt number of the recording system is 8003. The measurement includes the values for the total number of vehicles per 24 hours and the proportion of heavy goods vehicles (HGV). The system measures both the traffic in the direction of the Lörrach-Mitte junction and the traffic in the direction of Lörrach-Ost. The proportion of traffic in both directions is roughly equal, but has shifted increasingly in the direction of Lörrach-Mitte in recent years.

Until 2002, the Wiesentalbrücke only led eastwards as far as the Lörrach-Ost junction, from where it was only possible to continue eastwards on federal highway 34. From 2003, the "dead-end highway" was initially connected to one lane, and from 2010 to two lanes via the A 861 crossover to Rheinfelden and then on to Switzerland. This also led to a significant and sustained increase in traffic over the Wiesental Bridge.

Year	Vehicles per 24 hours	SV share
2005	15.295	11,2 %
2010	20.703	11,4 %
2013	23.159	9,9 %
2015	25.123	8,3 %
2017	27.485	8,2 %
2018	29.484	8,4 %
2020	23.082	10,2 %

== Accompanying construction measures ==
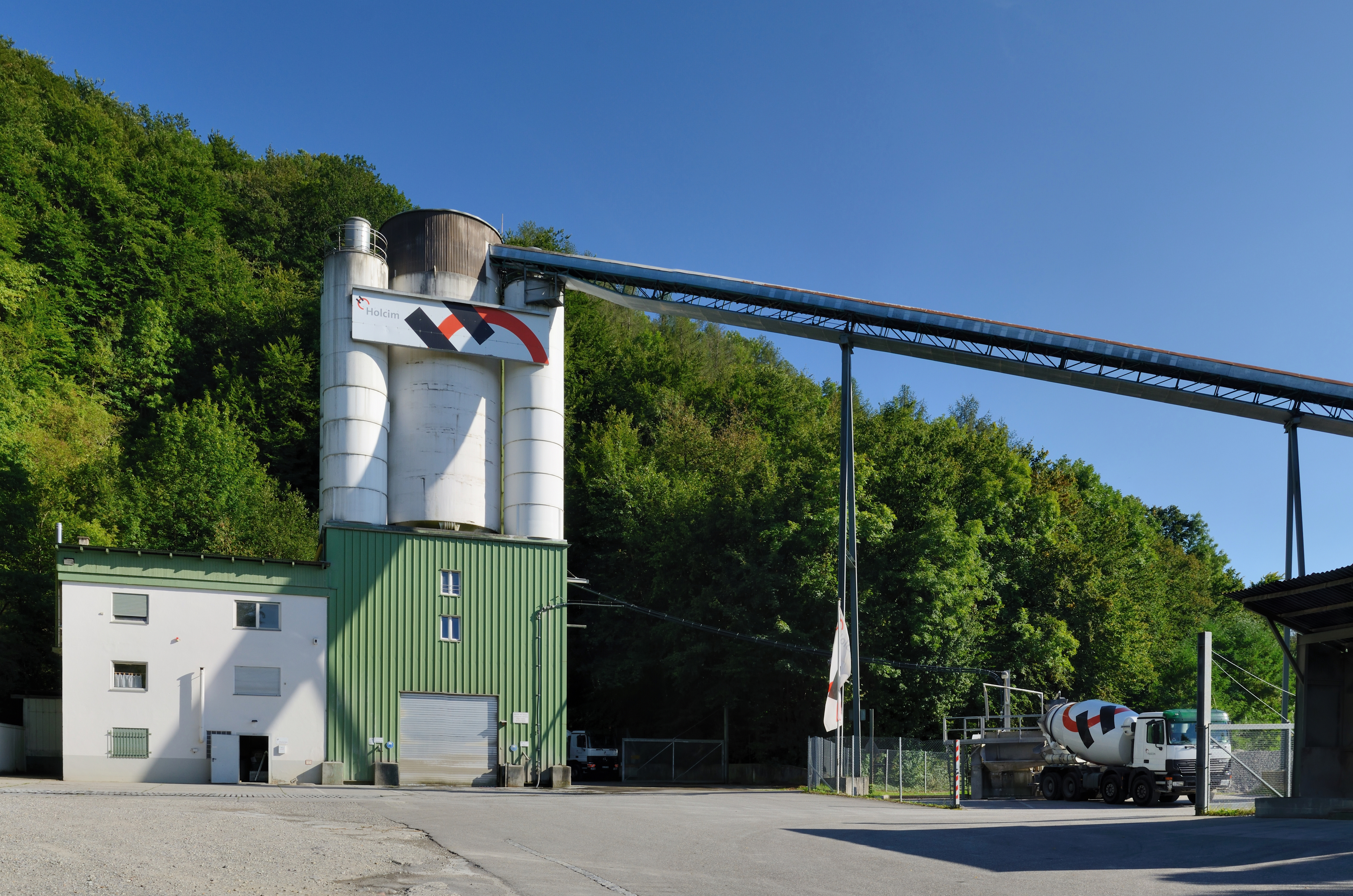
The vertical plant of the concrete factory built especially for the Wiesental Bridge is still in use today.

At the southern entrance to the Lörrach district of Brombach, a 26-metre-high vertical concrete production plant was built in the early 1980s in the immediate vicinity of the bridge construction site. This concrete plant still exists today and is now a production site of the Swiss cement producer Holcim.

Before construction work began on the Wiesental Bridge, it had to be ensured that a landslide that occurred in August 1979 would not affect the route of the A 98 motorway running downhill in the area of the Röttelnweiler hamlet (Röttler Hang) in the long term. At this point, the freeway route crosses the Röttler valley in a 250-metre-long cut; the valley hollow continues uphill with a slope of 18 to 20°. The geologically unfavorable conditions at this point consist of oligocene clay and mudstone layers, sand and sandstone deposits as well as a 350-meter-long and 150-meter-wide fossil landslide The slipped soil made it necessary to excavate a cut, and since the sliding friction in this area was too low, additional safety measures had to be implemented. In order to slow down the movement of the slope, a ballast was placed in the cut area and a concrete pile slab and a deep drainage slot system were installed to improve water permeability. This allowed the landslide to be supported and drained at the same time.

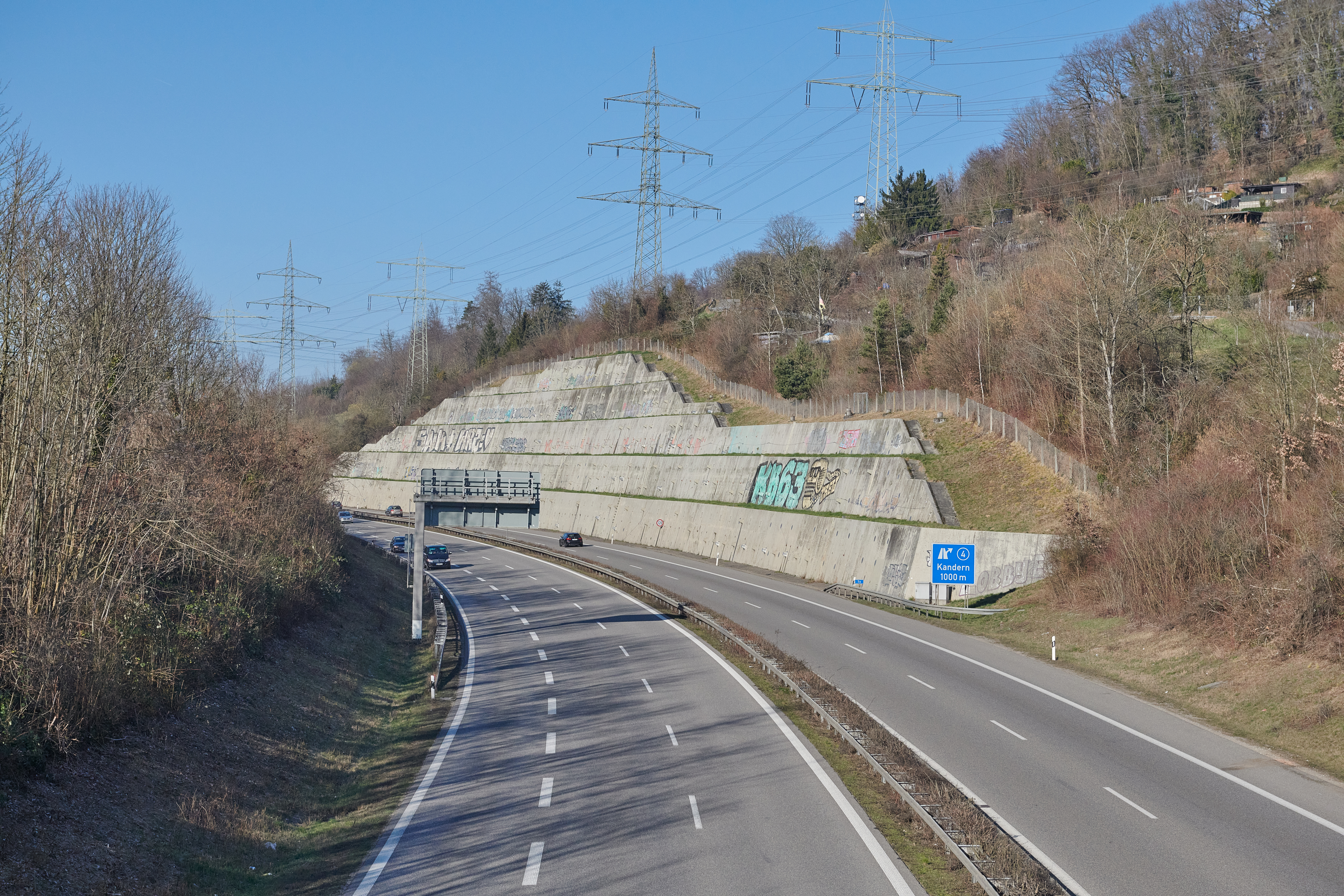
Retaining wall on the Röttler Hang

Following these measures, the embankment on the mountain side was secured in terraces with anchored wall elements made of reinforced concrete. On a 350-metre-long section, around 500 meters northwest of the northern start of the bridge, a concrete retaining wall up to 22 meters high rises up into the air for these reasons. At the heart of the retaining wall are 135 anchor heads set in concrete, which protrude up to 37 meters into the ground. Each of these anchor heads, distributed over five levels, can withstand a weight of around 40 tons. The anchor heads were refurbished in August 2015 at a cost of 80,000 euros. In order to reduce the massiveness of this concrete wall, greening measures were carried out on the numerous berms.

As the route south of the Wiesentalbrücke bridge separates the area of the Homburg municipal forest, two pedestrian bridges have since connected Lörrach with the forest, which is considered a local recreation area.

== Reception ==
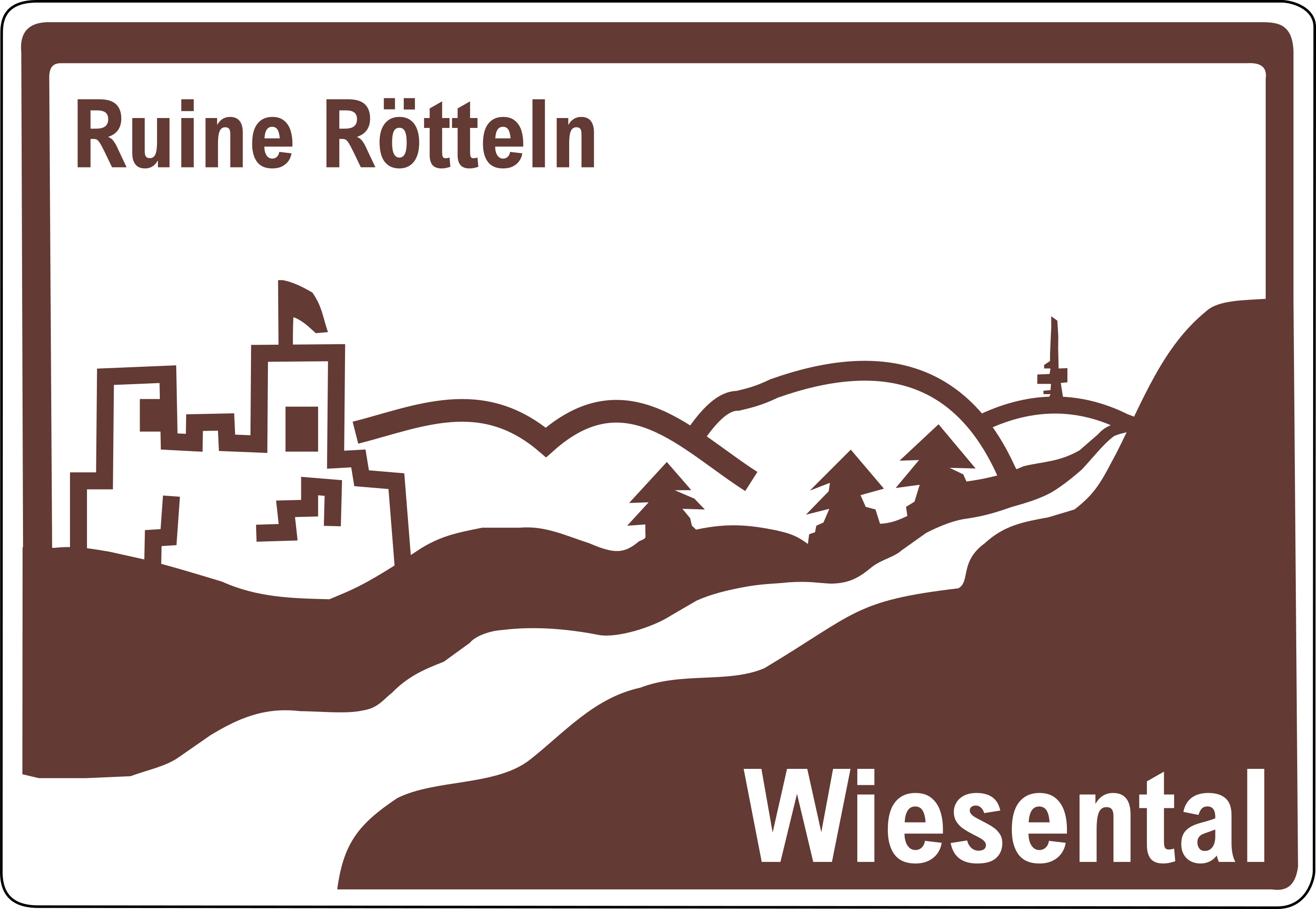
Tourist information board: Rötteln Castle, Wiesental

=== Tourism ===
A few kilometers before the Wiesental bridge, there is a tourist information board on both sides of the road about the former hilltop castle of Rötteln, which is now a ruin visible from afar on a mountain top above the Wiesental valley. The signs are located at highway kilometers 6.2 and 9.5 of the A 98 and show not only the castle and the Wiesental valley but also the hills and mountains of the Black Forest. The Blauen is shown on the sign as the most prominent peak with a transmission tower at its top. The view, similar to the one captured on the information board, can be seen in particular by driving westwards from Lörrach-Ost over the Wiesental bridge. This pictorial information board is one of a total of four along the A 98.

=== Fine arts ===
The characteristic traffic structure in Lörrach was taken up by regional artists. In 1988, Bauhaus student Arthur Schmidt painted a picture in the style of expressive realism entitled "Landscape Conservation Area". It shows the distant view just below the hatch at the Röttler church down to the Wiesental valley. The view from the highway route leads past Rötteln Castle. The Wiesental bridge stretches into the distant horizon. The picture was painted on paper using mixed media; pastels and pencil were also used.

In the early 1980s, the visual artist Waltraud Hett thematized the Wiesental Bridge in a painting called "Highway construction near Rötteln". It shows a construction crane next to the highway bridge, the construction work on the bridge and the landscape and settlement of Tumringen and Rötteln in the background.

Both pictures are in the collection of the Dreiländermuseum.

== Bibliography ==
- Schmidt, Arnold (1981). A 98 – Umgehung Lörrach. In: Stadt Lörrach (Hrsg.): Unser Lörrach 1981, eine Grenzstadt im Spiegel der Zeit. (Band 12). Lörrach: Kropf und Herz. pp. 61–67.
- Arbeitsgemeinschaft Wiesentalbrücke (ed.): Wiesentalbrücke Lörrach, Freiburg 1982.
- Wittmann, Otto (1982). Geology along the High Rhine highway A 98 (Märkt, Lucke, Rötteln, Homburg) in: Stadt Lörrach (ed.): Unser Lörrach 1982, eine Grenzstadt im Spiegel der Zeit. (Volume 13) (in German). Lörrach: Kropf und Herz. pp. 22–33.
- Wittmann, Otto (1983). Stadt Lörrach (Hrsg.): Lörrach: Landschaft – Geschichte – Kultur (in German). Lörrach: Verlag Stadt Lörrach. pp. 523–525. ISBN 3980084108.
- Schlusche, Kai Hendrik (2011). Graffiti unter der Autobahn; Die Bridge-Gallery in Lörrach (in German). Lörrach: Lutz Verlag Waldemar. ISBN 9783922107910.
- Schlusche, Kai Hendrik (2015). StreetArt Basel und Region, Die Hot-Spots im Dreiländereck (in German). Hamburg: Verlag Gundberg Nerger GmbH. ISBN 9783945772003.
