= Gersbach (Schopfheim) =

- Stadtteil of Schopfheim
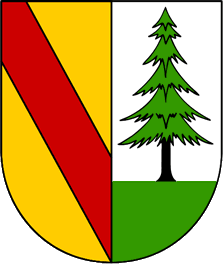
- Coat of arms
- Interactive map of Gersbach
- Location within Germany Location within Baden-Württemberg
- Coordinates: 47°41′51″N 7°56′01″E
- Country: Germany
- State: Baden-Württemberg
- District: Lörrach
- Town: Schopfheim

Area
  - Total: 24.09 km^{2} (9.30 sq mi)
- Elevation: 800–1,170 m (2,620–3,840 ft)

Population (2011)
  - Total: 630
  - Density: 26/km^{2} (68/sq mi)
- Time zone: UTC+01:00 (CET)
  - Summer (DST): UTC+02:00 (CEST)
- Postal codes: 79650

Gersbach is a state-recognized resort town in the municipality of Schopfheim, a town in the district of Lörrach in Baden-Württemberg, Germany.

Gersbach is situated in a mountain valley basin to the south from the eponymous river in the Black Forest at an altitude of 800–1170 m above sea level. The old town of Schopfheim is roughly 17 km away. The formerly independent village, together with the six associated hamlets (Fetzenbach, Gersbach-Au, Lochmühle, Metteln, Neuhaus, and Schlechtbach) forms one of Baden-Württemberg's largest Gemarkung, with an area of 2409 hectares.
