= Fahrnau station =

Railway station in Schopfheim, Germany

Fahrnau
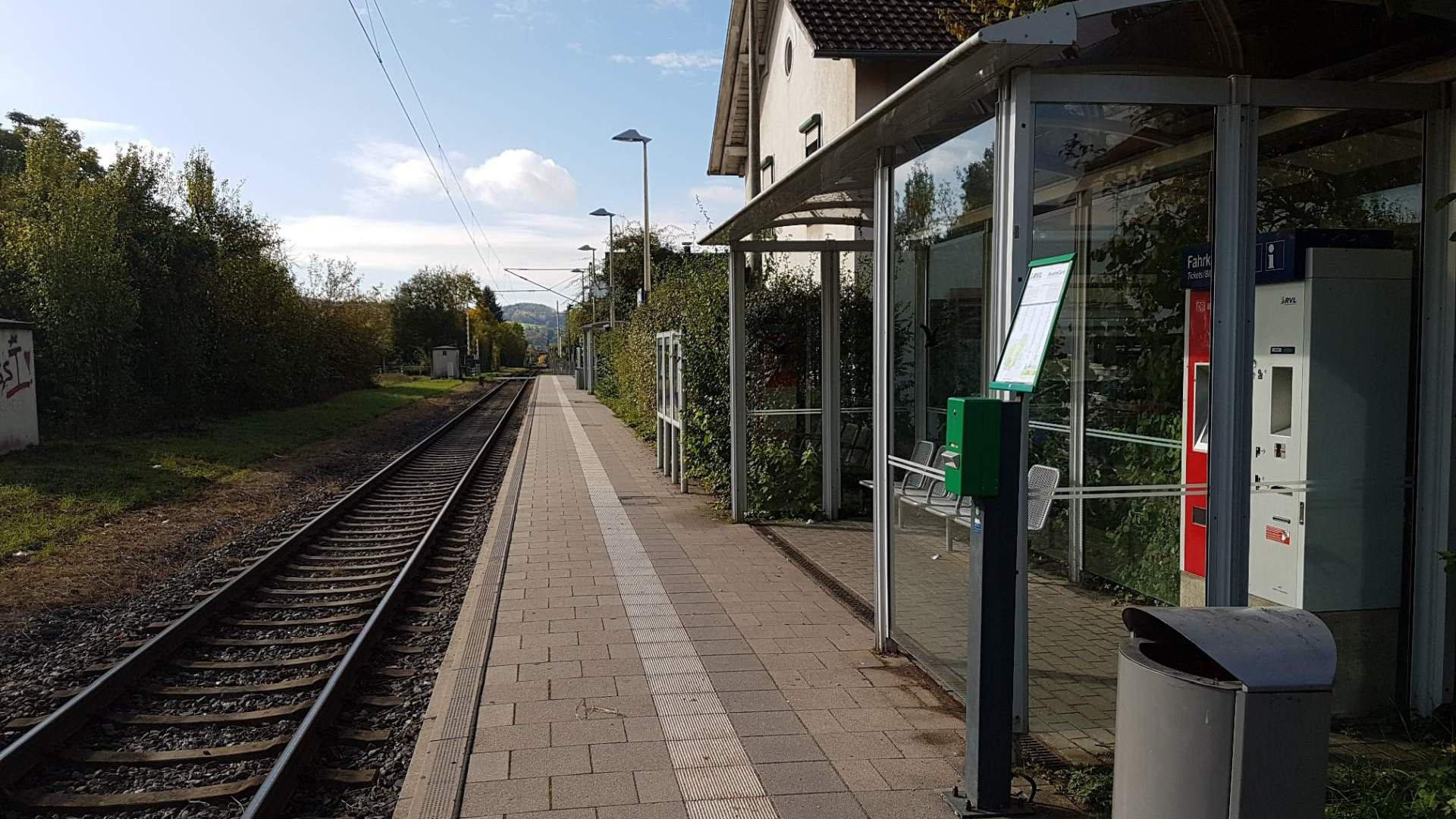
- The station platform in 2017

General information
- Location: Schopfheim, Baden-Württemberg; Germany
- Coordinates: 47°39′42″N 7°50′22″E
- Owner: Deutsche Bahn
- Lines: Wiese Valley Railway (KBS 735)
- Distance: 22.0 km (13.7 mi) from Basel Bad Bf
- Platforms: 1 side platform
- Tracks: 1
- Train operators: SBB GmbH
- Connections: Südbadenbus bus lines

Other information
- Fare zone: 6 (RVL)

Services
Preceding station	Basel S-Bahn	Following station
Schopfheim-Schlattholz towards Weil am Rhein	S5 Limited service	Hausen-Raitbach towards Zell (Wiesental)
Schopfheim-Schlattholz towards Basel SBB	S6	Hausen-Raitbach towards Zell (Wiesental)
Location

Fahrnau station (German: Bahnhof Fahrnau) is a railway station in the municipality of Schopfheim, in Baden-Württemberg, Germany. It is located on standard gauge Wiese Valley Railway of Deutsche Bahn.

== Services ==
As of the December 2020 timetable change, the following services stop at Fahrnau:

- Basel S-Bahn:
  - S5: hourly service between Weil am Rhein and Zell (Wiesental) on Sundays.
  - S6: half-hourly service between Basel SBB and Zell (Wiesental).
