= Schopfheim-Schlattholz station =

Railway station in Germany

Schopfheim-Schlattholz

General information
- Location: Schopfheim, Baden-Württemberg; Germany
- Coordinates: 47°39′14″N 7°50′00″E
- Owner: Deutsche Bahn
- Lines: Wiese Valley Railway (KBS 735)
- Platforms: 1 side platform
- Tracks: 1
- Train operators: SBB GmbH

Other information
- Fare zone: 6 (RVL)

History
- Opened: 9 December 2017

Services
Preceding station	Basel S-Bahn	Following station
Schopfheim towards Weil am Rhein	S5 Limited service	Fahrnau towards Zell (Wiesental)
Schopfheim towards Basel SBB	S6	Fahrnau towards Zell (Wiesental)
Location

Schopfheim-Schlattholz station (German: Bahnhof Schopfheim-Schlattholz) is a railway station in the municipality of Schopfheim, in Baden-Württemberg, Germany. It is located on standard gauge Wiese Valley Railway of Deutsche Bahn. The station opened on 9 December 2017. An infill station, it was built at a cost of 1.4 million euros, shared between the city and the Basel Commuter Fund (Pendlerfonds Basel). The stop is handicap-accessible, and includes a 150-metre (490 ft)-long side platform with shelters and ticket vending machines.

== Services ==
As of the December 2020 timetable change, the following services stop at Schopfheim-Schlattholz:

- Basel S-Bahn:
  - S5: hourly service between Weil am Rhein and Zell (Wiesental) on Sundays.
  - S6: half-hourly service between Basel SBB and Zell (Wiesental).
