= Hausen im Wiesental =

- Municipality
- Coat of arms

- Location of Hausen im Wiesental within Lörrach district
- Interactive map of Hausen im Wiesental
- Location within Germany Location within Baden-Württemberg
- Coordinates: 47°40′53″N 7°50′26″E
- Country: Germany
- State: Baden-Württemberg
- Admin. region: Freiburg
- District: Lörrach

Government
  - Mayor (2023–31): Philipp Lotter

Area
  - Total: 5.14 km^{2} (1.98 sq mi)
- Elevation: 404 m (1,325 ft)

Population (2025-12-31)
  - Total: 2,375
  - Density: 462/km^{2} (1,200/sq mi)
- Time zone: UTC+01:00 (CET)
  - Summer (DST): UTC+02:00 (CEST)
- Postal codes: 79687–79688
- Dialling codes: 07622
- Vehicle registration: LÖ
- Website: www.hausen-im-wiesental.de

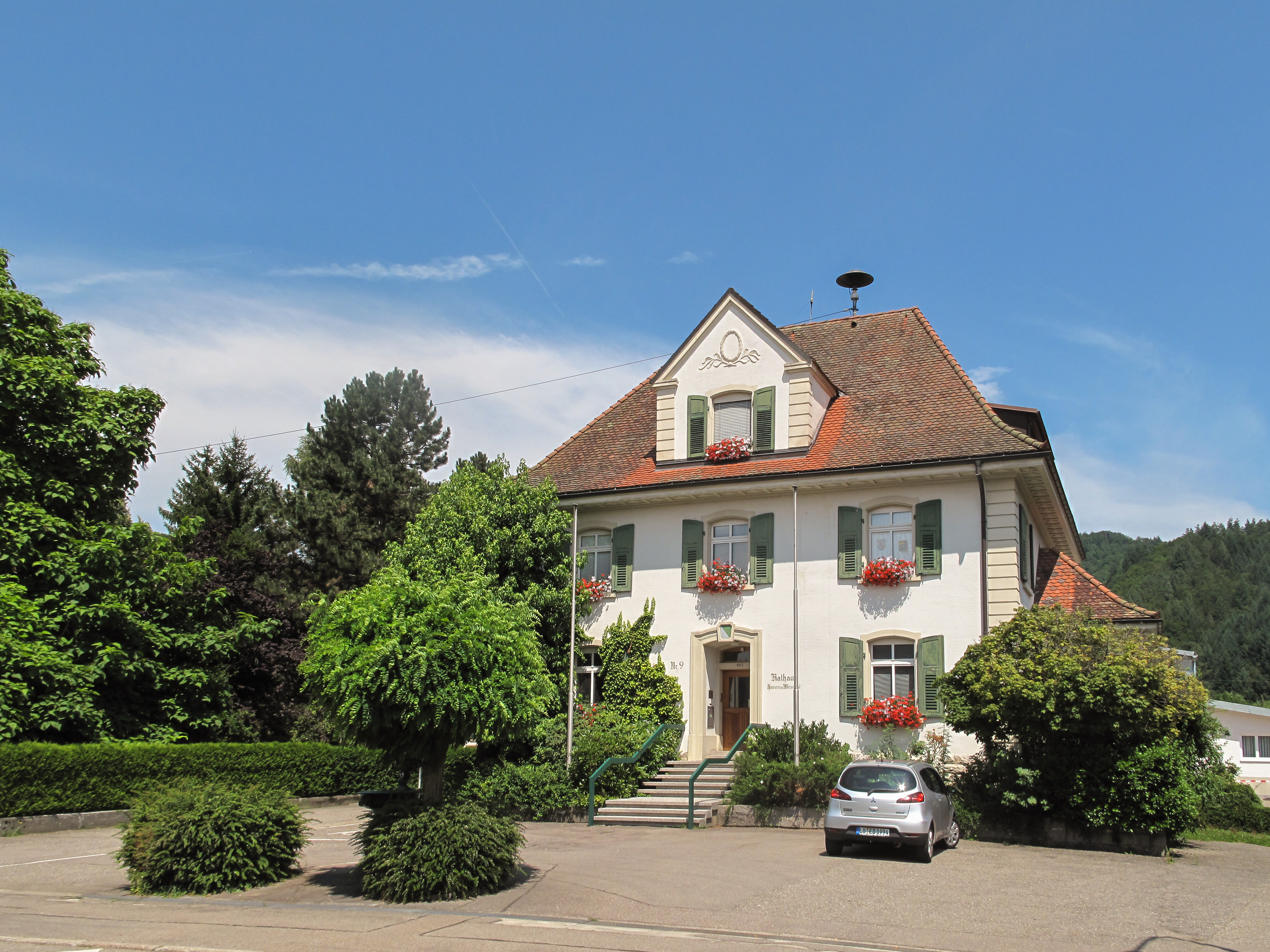
Townhall

Hausen im Wiesental (German pronunciation: [ˈhaʊzn̩ ʔɪm ˈviːzn̩ˌtaːl], lit. 'Hausen in the Wiese Valley') is a village in the Lörrach district of Baden-Württemberg, Germany. It is famous for the dialectal poet Johann Peter Hebel who lived in Hausen for many years. The eminent expressionistic painter August Babberger was born in Hausen in 1885. The first historic mention of Hausen was in 1362.

== Geography ==
Hausen im Wiesental is located in the valley of the Wiese which is an affluent of the Rhine. The Wiesental, the valley of the Wiese, was one of the first areas within the grand duchy of Baden to be industrialized. The commune of Hausen is located about 15 km away from the Swiss border. The neighbors are the city of Zell im Wiesental with its suburb Gresgen in the north and northeast as well as Schopfheim with its suburbs Enkenstein, Raitbach, and Fahrnau.

The entire area of Hausen is part of the Southern Black Forest Nature Park.

== Transport ==
The municipality has a railway station, Hausen-Raitbach, on the Wiese Valley Railway.

== Gallery ==
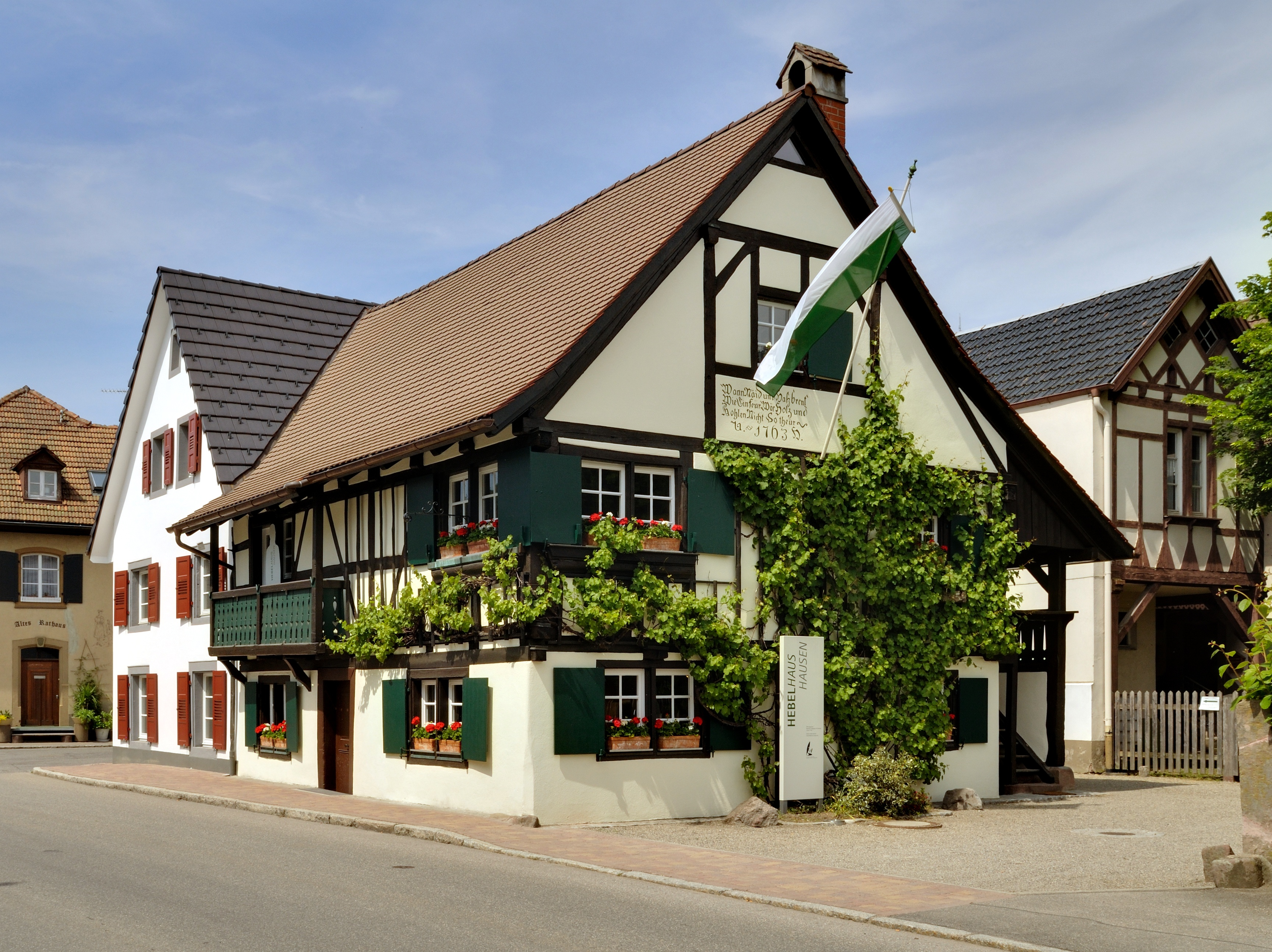
The Hebelhuus, where Johann Peter Hebel lived for many years.

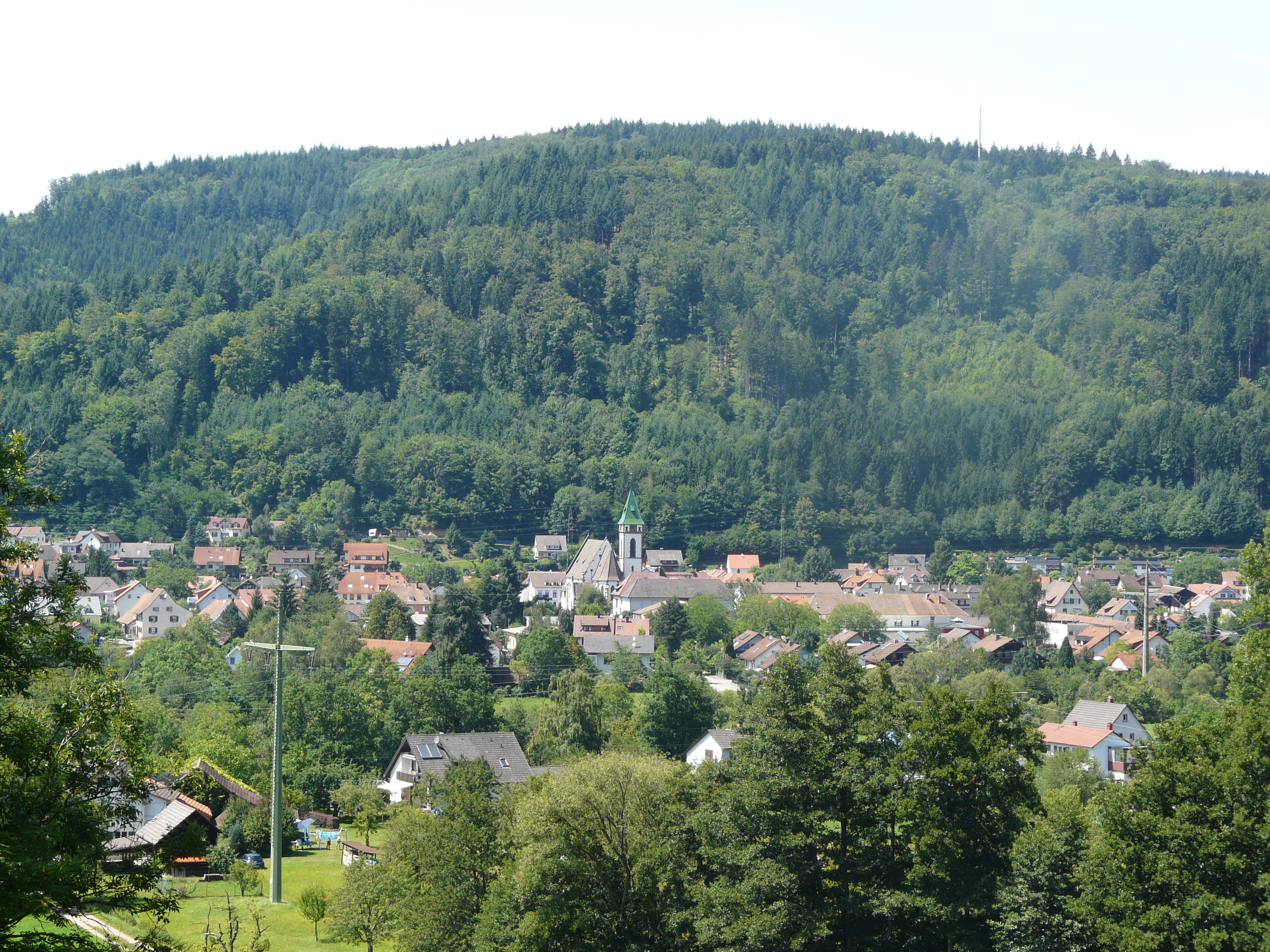
Middle and Northern part of the village.

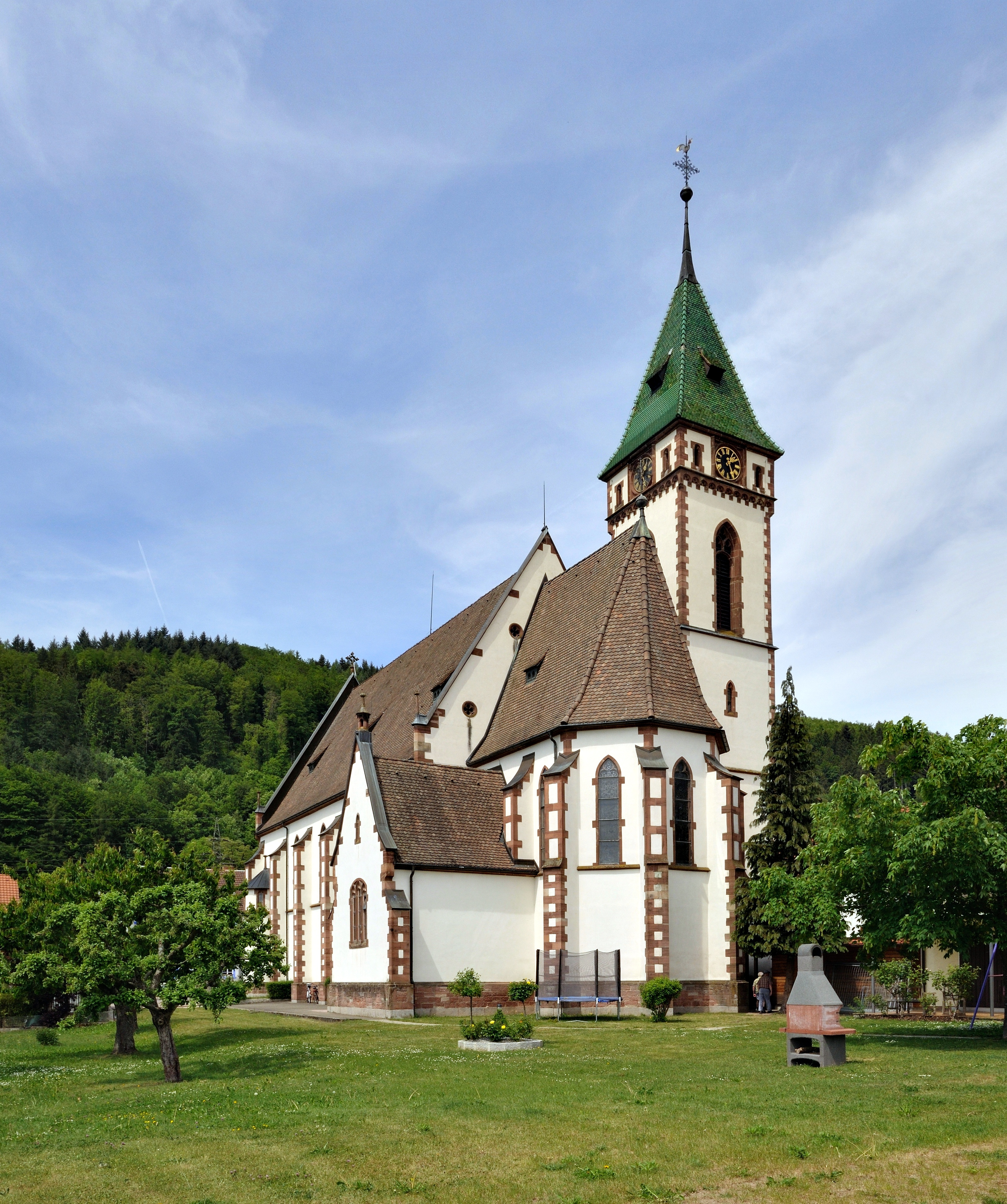
Catholic Church

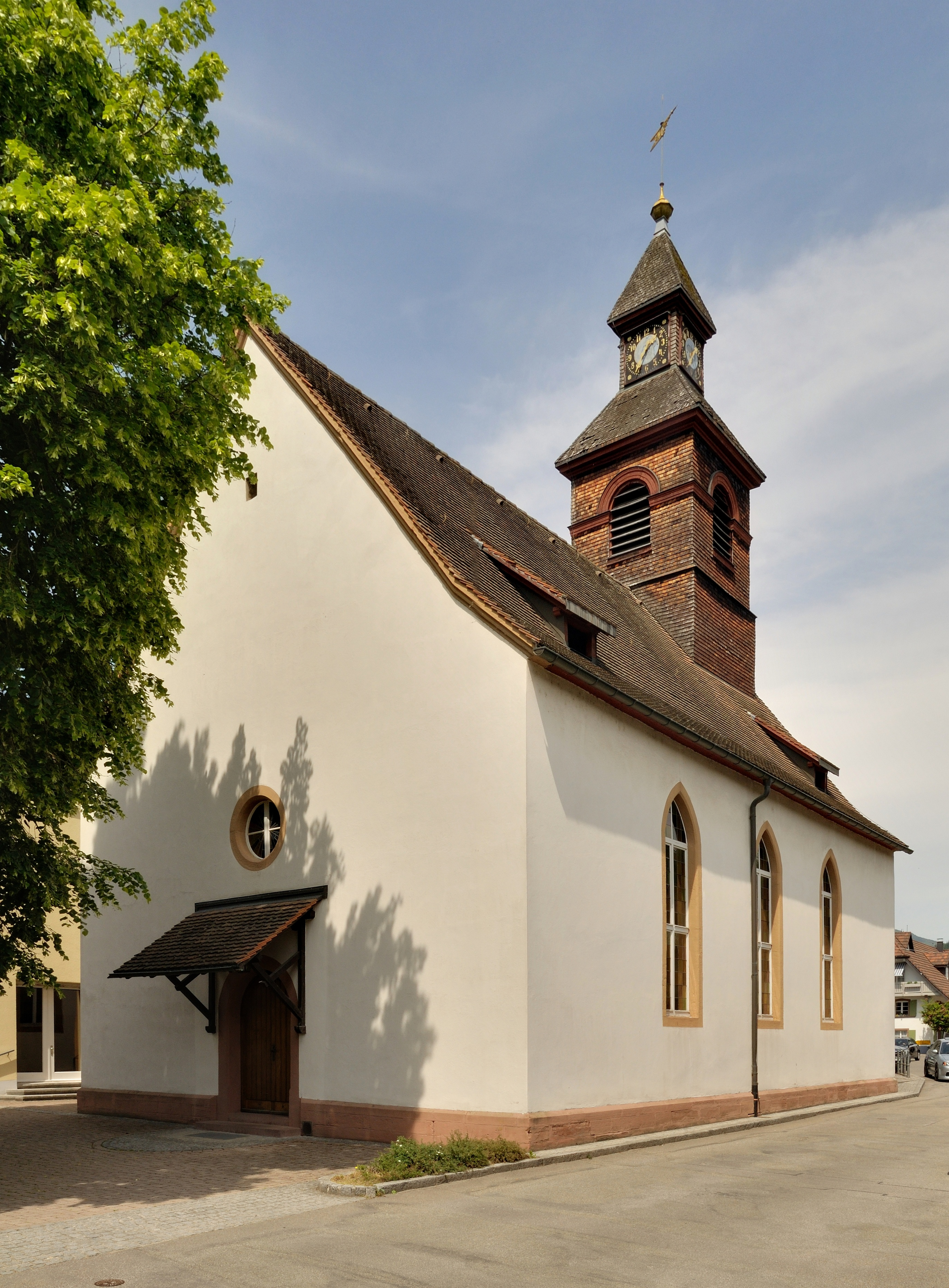
Protestant Church
