= Hausen-Raitbach station =

Railway station in Hausen im Wiesental, Germany

Hausen-Raitbach
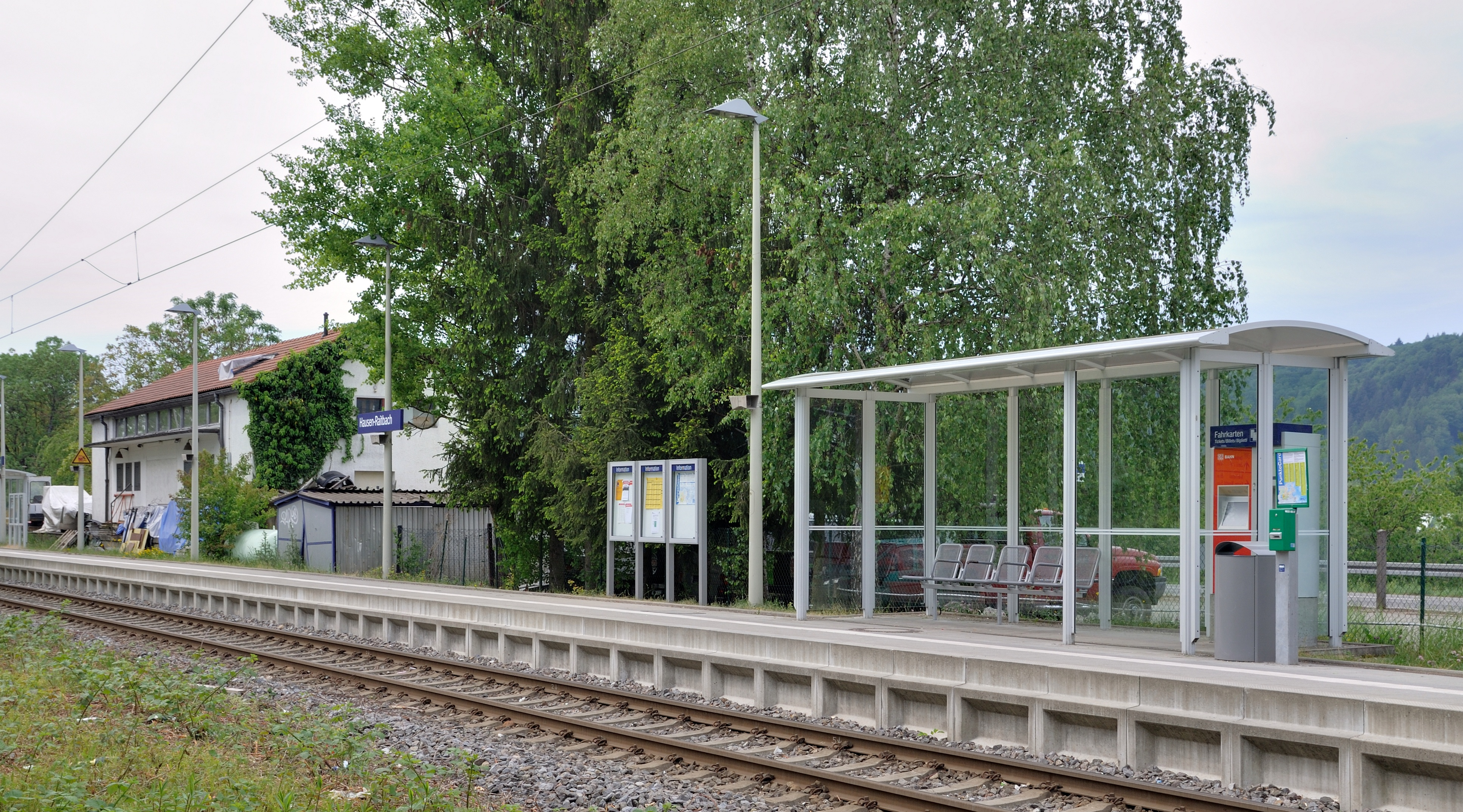
- The station in 2011

General information
- Location: Hausen im Wiesental, Baden-Württemberg; Germany
- Coordinates: 47°40′46″N 7°50′46″E
- Owner: Deutsche Bahn
- Lines: Wiese Valley Railway (KBS 735)
- Distance: 24.0 km (14.9 mi) from Basel Bad Bf
- Platforms: 1 side platform
- Tracks: 1
- Train operators: SBB GmbH
- Connections: Südbadenbus bus lines

Other information
- Fare zone: 6 (RVL)

Services
Preceding station	Basel S-Bahn	Following station
Fahrnau towards Weil am Rhein	S5 Limited service	Zell (Wiesental) Terminus
Fahrnau towards Basel SBB	S6	Zell (Wiesental) Terminus
Location

Hausen-Raitbach station (German: Bahnhof Hausen-Raitbach) is a railway station in the municipality of Hausen im Wiesental, in Baden-Württemberg, Germany. It is located on standard gauge Wiese Valley Railway of Deutsche Bahn.

== Services ==
As of the December 2020 timetable change, the following services stop at Hausen-Raitbach:

- Basel S-Bahn:
  - S5: hourly service between Weil am Rhein and Zell (Wiesental) on Sundays.
  - S6: half-hourly service between Basel SBB and Zell (Wiesental).
