= Schopfheim station =

Railway station in Schopfheim, Germany

Schopfheim
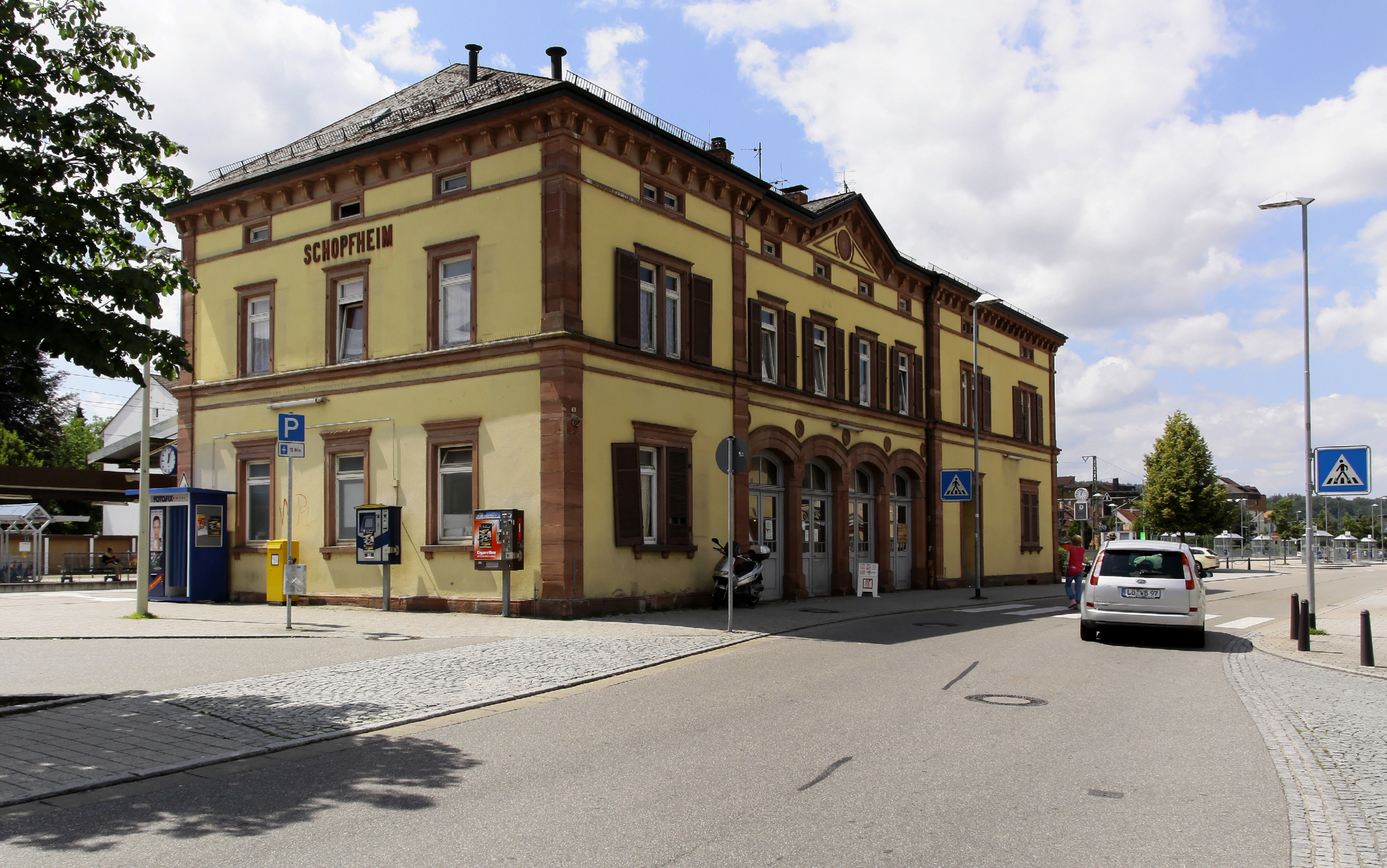
- The station building in 2012

General information
- Location: Schopfheim, Baden-Württemberg; Germany
- Coordinates: 47°38′53″N 7°49′22″E
- Owner: Deutsche Bahn
- Lines: Wiese Valley Railway (KBS 735); Wehra Valley Railway (closed)
- Distance: 19.9 km (12.4 mi) from Basel Bad Bf
- Platforms: 2 side platforms
- Tracks: 2
- Train operators: SBB GmbH
- Connections: Südbadenbus bus lines

Other information
- Fare zone: 6 (RVL)

Services
Preceding station	Basel S-Bahn	Following station
Schopfheim West towards Weil am Rhein	S5 Limited service	Schopfheim-Schlattholz towards Zell (Wiesental)
Schopfheim West towards Basel SBB	S6	Schopfheim-Schlattholz towards Zell (Wiesental)
Location

Schopfheim station (German: Bahnhof Schopfheim) is a railway station in the municipality of Schopfheim, in Baden-Württemberg, Germany. It is located on standard gauge Wiese Valley Railway of Deutsche Bahn. It was formerly the site of the junction with the Wehra Valley Railway to Bad Säckingen. Passenger service over that line ended in 1971, and the line itself was abandoned in 1994.

== Services ==
As of the December 2020 timetable change, the following services stop at Schopfheim:

- Basel S-Bahn:
  - S5: hourly service between Weil am Rhein and Zell (Wiesental) on Sundays.
  - S6: half-hourly service between Basel SBB and Zell (Wiesental).
