= Thomas Mindermann =

German-born Swiss neurosurgeon

Thomas Mindermann is a German-born Swiss neurosurgeon and researcher. He was born on March 10, 1955, in Schopfheim, West-Germany. Mindermann arrived in Switzerland in 1975 where he studied medicine at the University of Basel. In 1995, he became board certified as a neurosurgeon in Switzerland.

== Research and career ==
Mindermann was appointed as a Senior Pituitary Research Fellow in the Department of Neurosurgery at the University of California, San Francisco (UCSF) from 1992 until 1993. He was the first Swiss neurosurgeon applying radiosurgery with both the Gamma Knife and the CyberKnife. Currently, he practices neurosurgery in Zurich, Switzerland and he is on the board of medical directors of Klinik Im Park, Hirslanden, Zurich since 2001.

== Publications ==
- Mindermann, Thomas; Zimmerli, Werner; Gratzl, Otmar (1998). "Rifampin Concentrations in Various Compartments of the Human Brain: A Novel Method for Determining Drug Levels in the Cerebral Extracellular Space". Antimicrobial Agents and Chemotherapy. 42 (10): 2626–2629. doi:10.1128/AAC.42.10.2626. ISSN 0066-4804. PMC 105908. PMID 9756766.
- Mindermann, Thomas; Staub, Jean-Jacques; Probst, Alphonse (1998). "High rate of unexpected histology in presumed pituitary adenomas". The Lancet. 352 (9138): 1445. doi:10.1016/s0140-6736(05)61268-8. ISSN 0140-6736. PMID 9808000. S2CID 44414543.
- Mindermann, Thomas; Wilson, Charles B. (1994). "Age-related and gender-related occurrence of pituitary adenomas". Clinical Endocrinology. 41 (3). Wiley: 359–364. doi:10.1111/j.1365-2265.1994.tb02557.x. ISSN 0300-0664. PMID 7893282. S2CID 37496441.
- Mindermann, Thomas (1999). "Pressure gradients within the central nervous system". Journal of Clinical Neuroscience. 6 (6): 464–466. doi:10.1016/s0967-5868(99)90001-2. ISSN 0967-5868. PMID 18639181. S2CID 46200443.
- Mindermann, T.; Schlegel, I. (2013-01-01). "Grading of vestibular schwannomas and corresponding tumor volumes: ramifications for radiosurgery". Acta Neurochirurgica. 155 (1): 71–74. doi:10.1007/s00701-012-1553-4. ISSN 0942-0940. PMID 23160632. S2CID 31061306.
- Mindermann, Thomas; Schlegel, Ines (2014-06-01). "How to distinguish tumor growth from transient expansion of vestibular schwannomas following Gamma Knife radiosurgery". Acta Neurochirurgica. 156 (6): 1121–1123. doi:10.1007/s00701-014-2063-3. ISSN 0942-0940. PMID 24682634. S2CID 8913084.
- Mindermann, Thomas; Heckl, Stefan; Mack, Andreas (2020-09-01). "High incidence of transient perifocal edema following upfront radiosurgery for intraventricular meningiomas". Acta Neurochirurgica. 162 (9): 2177–2182. doi:10.1007/s00701-020-04281-1. ISSN 0942-0940. PMID 32140787. S2CID 212405017.
