= Steinen station (Germany) =

Railway station in Steinen, Germany

Steinen
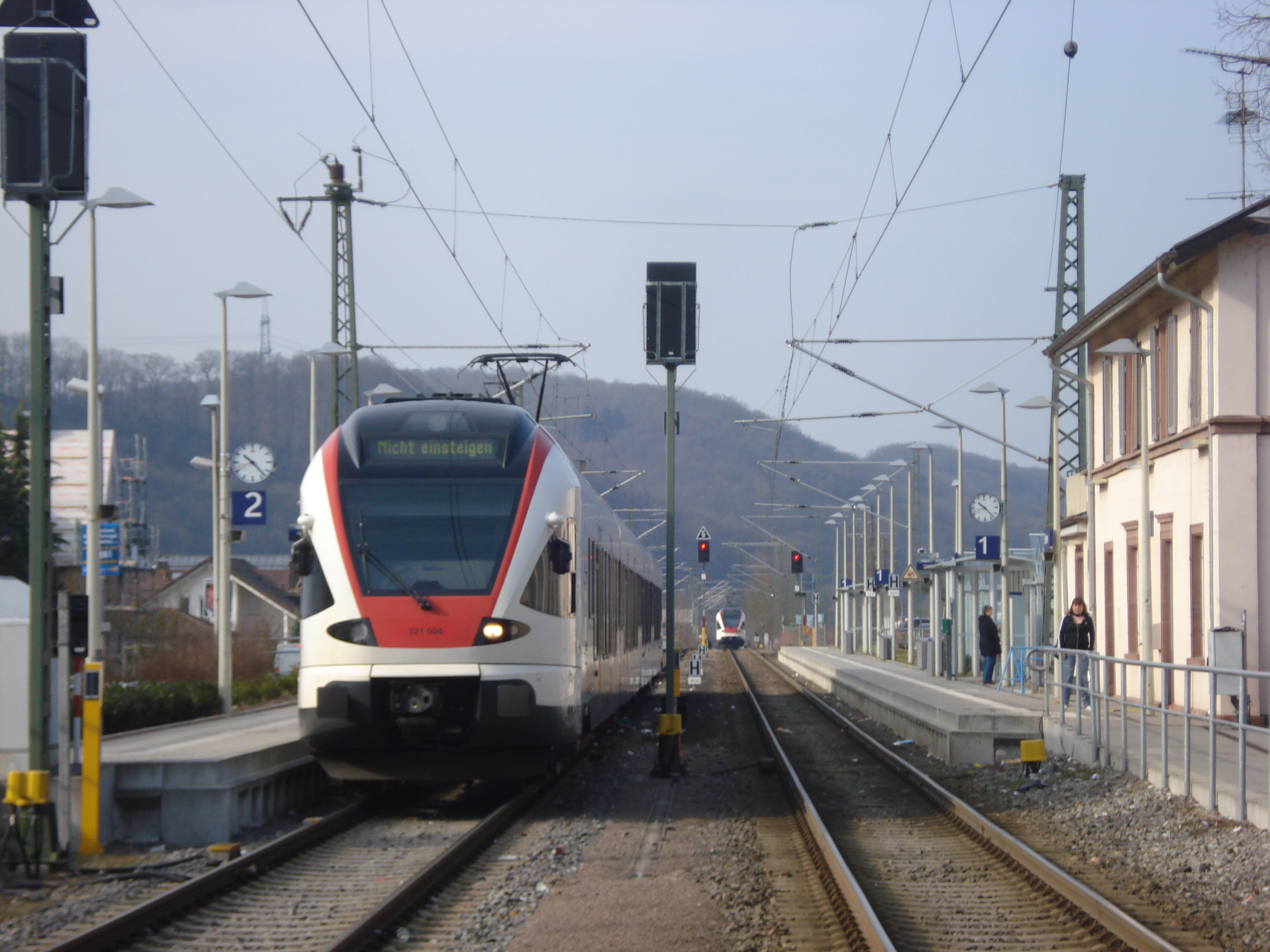
- Trains at the station in 2011

General information
- Location: Steinen, Baden-Württemberg; Germany
- Coordinates: 47°38′30″N 7°44′30″E
- Owner: Deutsche Bahn
- Lines: Wiese Valley Railway (KBS 735)
- Distance: 13.8 km (8.6 mi) from Basel Bad Bf
- Platforms: 2 side platforms
- Tracks: 2
- Train operators: SBB GmbH
- Connections: Südbadenbus bus lines

Other information
- Fare zone: 6 (RVL)

Services
Preceding station	Basel S-Bahn	Following station
Lörrach-Brombach/Hauingen towards Weil am Rhein	S5	Maulburg towards Zell (Wiesental)
Lörrach-Brombach/Hauingen towards Basel SBB	S6	Maulburg towards Zell (Wiesental)
Location

Steinen station (German: Bahnhof Steinen) is a railway station in the municipality of Steinen, in Baden-Württemberg, Germany. It is located on standard gauge Wiese Valley Railway of Deutsche Bahn.

== Services ==
As of the December 2020 timetable change, the following services stop at Steinen:

- Basel S-Bahn:
  - S5: half-hourly service to Weil am Rhein on weekdays; hourly service between Weil am Rhein and Zell (Wiesental) on Sundays.
  - S6: half-hourly service between Basel SBB and Zell (Wiesental).
