= Haltingen station =

Railway station in Weil am Rhein, Germany

Haltingen
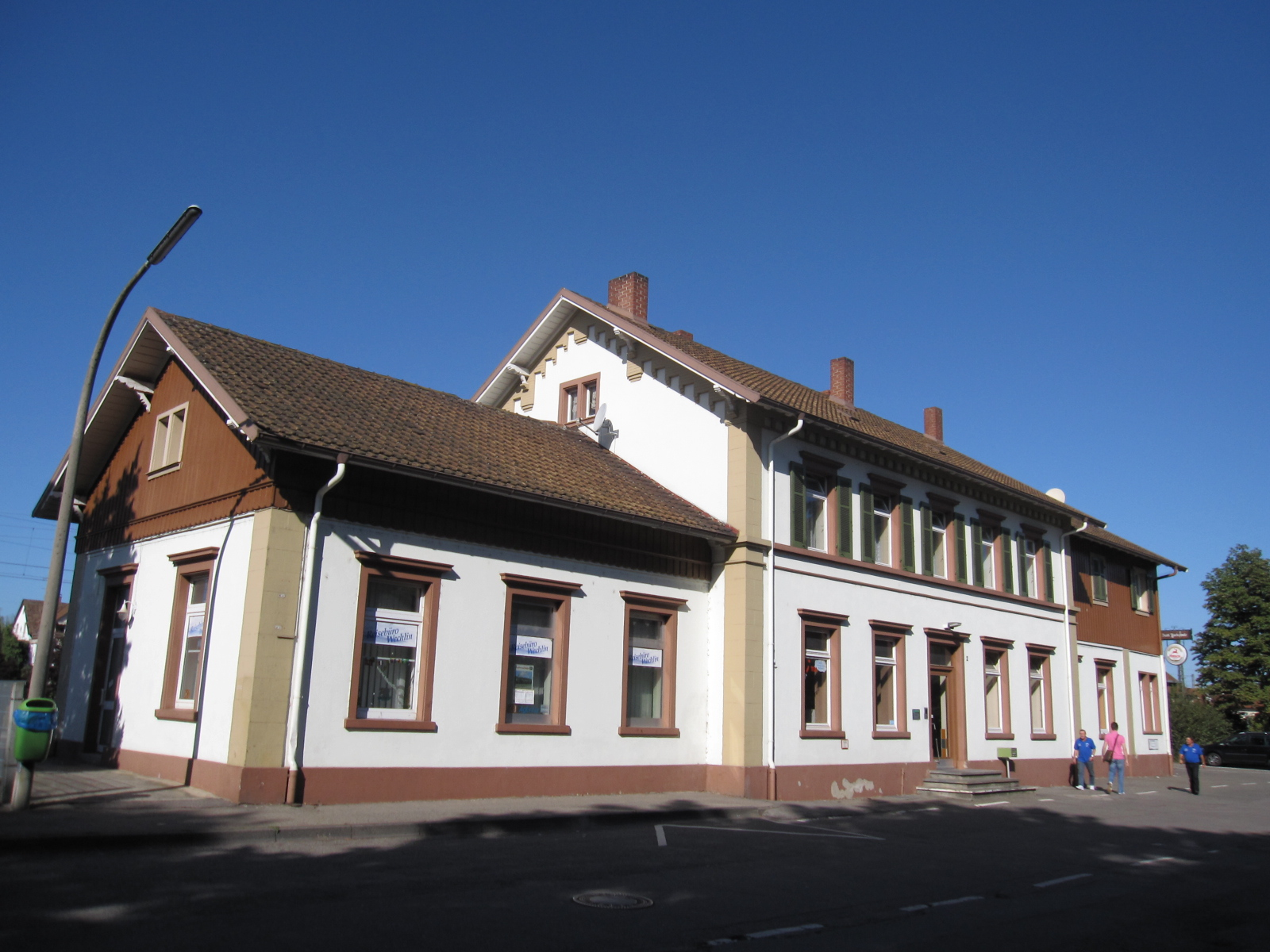
- The station in 2009

General information
- Location: Burgunderstrasse 2 Weil am Rhein, Baden-Württemberg; Germany
- Coordinates: 47°36′46″N 7°36′42″E
- Owner: DB Netz
- Operator: DB Station&Service
- Lines: Rhine Valley Railway (KBS 702); Kander Valley Railway (KBS 12733)
- Distance: 264.3 km (164.2 mi) from Mannheim Hauptbahnhof
- Platforms: 2 side platforms
- Tracks: 2
- Train operators: DB Regio Baden-Württemberg
- Connections: SWEG bus lines

Other information
- Station code: 2511
- DS100 code: RHL
- IBNR: 8002546
- Category: 6
- Fare zone: 3 (RVL)

Services
Preceding station	DB Regio Baden-Württemberg	Following station
Eimeldingen towards Karlsruhe Hbf	RE 7	Weil am Rhein towards Basel Bad Bf
Eimeldingen towards Emmendingen	RB 27	Weil am Rhein towards Basel Bad Bf
Location

Haltingen station (German: Bahnhof Haltingen) is a railway station in the town of Weil am Rhein, in Baden-Württemberg, Germany. It is located on the Mannheim–Karlsruhe–Basel railway (Rhine Valley Railway) of Deutsche Bahn. The Kander Valley Railway heritage railway operates from a platform just north of the station.

== Services ==
As of the December 2021 timetable change, the following services stop at Haltingen:

- Regional-Express: service every ninety minutes between Basel Bad Bf and Offenburg or Karlsruhe.
