= August Babberger =

German painter

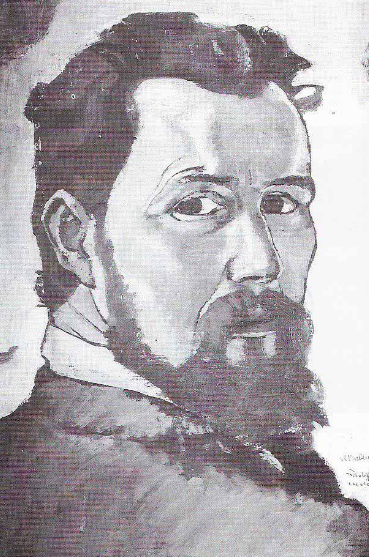
- Self-portrait, 1912
- Born: 8 December 1885; Hausen im Wiesental, Germany
- Died: 3 September 1936 (aged 50); Altdorf, Switzerland
- Occupation: Painter

August Babberger (8 December 1885 – 3 September 1936) was a German painter. His work was part of the painting event in the art competition at the 1928 Summer Olympics.

== Gallery ==
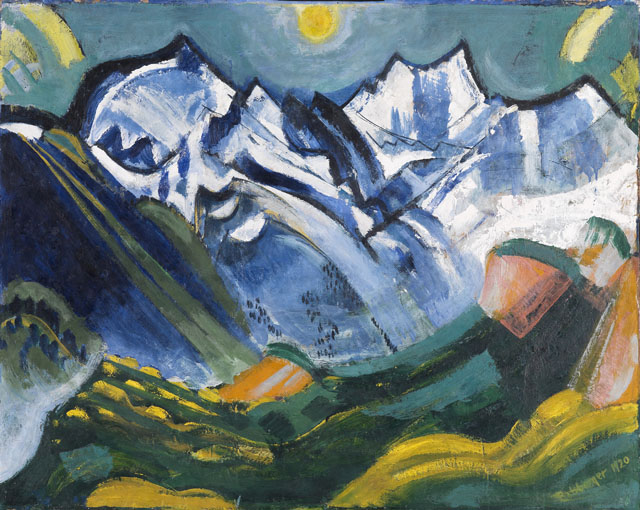
Hochgebirgslandschaft mit Scheerhorn

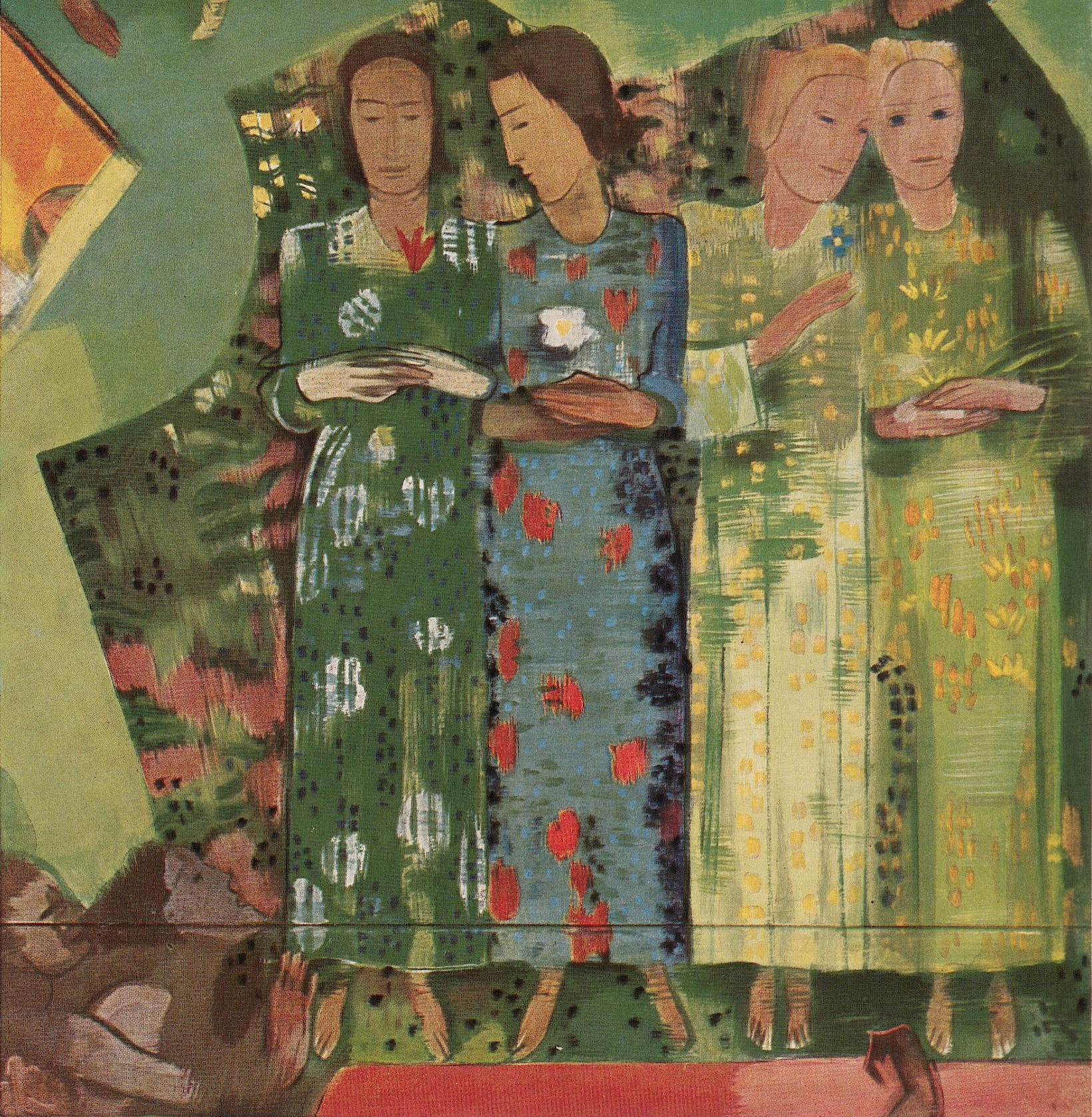
'Fest der Jugend', 1928

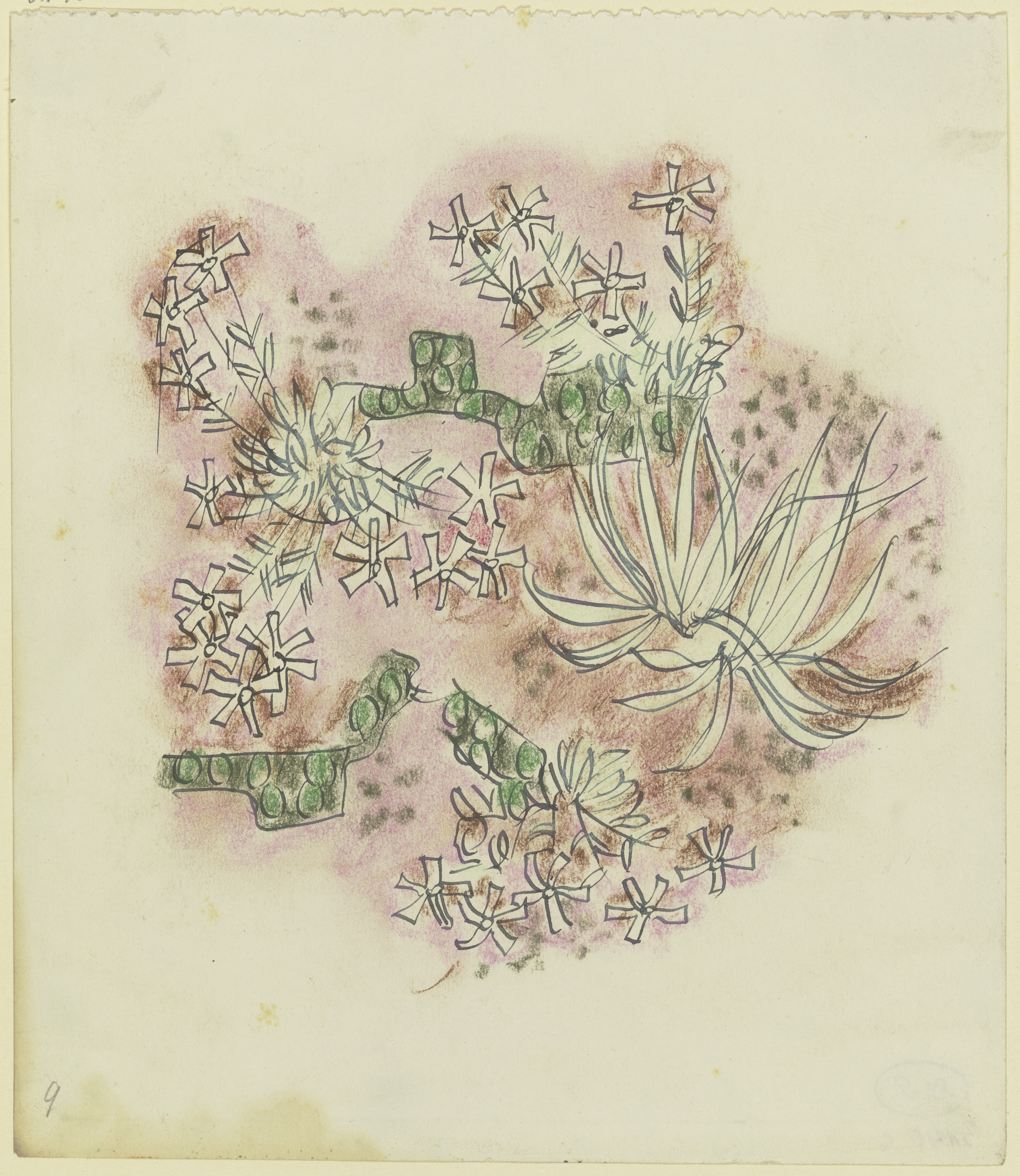
Study of plants
