= Steinen, Baden-Württemberg =

Steinen
- Municipality
- Coat of arms

- Location of Steinen within Lörrach district
- Interactive map of Steinen
- Location within Germany Location within Baden-Württemberg
- Coordinates: 47°38′43″N 7°44′25″E
- Country: Germany
- State: Baden-Württemberg
- Admin. region: Freiburg
- District: Lörrach
- Subdivisions: 7

Government
  - Mayor (2024–32): Gunther Braun

Area
  - Total: 46.86 km^{2} (18.09 sq mi)
- Elevation: 338 m (1,109 ft)

Population (2025-12-31)
  - Total: 10,500
  - Density: 224/km^{2} (580/sq mi)
- Time zone: UTC+01:00 (CET)
  - Summer (DST): UTC+02:00 (CEST)
- Postal codes: 79585
- Dialling codes: 07627
- Vehicle registration: LÖ
- Website: www.steinen.de

Steinen (German pronunciation: [ˈʃtaɪnən]; Steine) is a municipality in the district of Lörrach in the southwest of Baden-Württemberg, Germany. It is situated on the river Wiese, 15 km northeast of Basel, and 6 km northeast of Lörrach.

== Geography ==
The entire municipality of Steinen is situated in the front of the Wiesental valley of the Southern Black Forest. With the Steinenbach valley as its north–south axis, the municipality of Steinen forms a geographical crossroads to the Wiesental valley. IN total, the municipality stretches over 14 km in the largest north–south extension, the difference in altitude between the valley at 319 metres to the Wambacher Wasen at 987 metres in the north is more than 600m.

=== Neighbouring municipalities ===
The municipality borders Malsburg-Marzell to the north, the municipality Kleines Wiesental to the north-east, the town of Schopfheim and the municipality of Maulburg to the east, the town of Rheinfelden (Baden) to the south and the district capital Lörrach and the town of Kandern to the west.

=== Municipal structure ===
The municipality of Steinen consists of the seven districts Endenburg, Hägelberg, Höllstein, Hüsingen, Schlächtenhaus, Steinen and Weitenau with a total of 26 villages, hamlets, farms and houses. The spatial boundaries of the districts are identical to those of the former communities of the same name. Their official names are prefixed by the name of the community and followed by the name of the respective district, connected by a hyphen. The districts also form residential districts in the sense of the Baden-Württemberg municipal code. With the exception of the districts of Höllstein and Steinen, localities within the meaning of the Baden-Württemberg municipal regulations are established with their own local council and village head as its chairman.

== History ==
=== Until the 18th century ===
The first mentions of Steinen and some of its current districts date back to the 12th century. The former Weitenau monastery, halfway between the villages of Steinen and Schlächtenhaus, was first mentioned in documents in 1100. The village of Steinen is first mentioned (as "Staina") in a document of the Saint Blaise Abbey from 1113, when the Noble Walcho von Waldeck donated his goods there and in other places to the Saint Blaise Abbey. Also in 1113, a "Walcho von Staina" appears as a witness in a document; he is probably identical to Walcho von Waldeck. However, archaeological findings such as Alemannic row graves indicate earlier settlement.

In the 13th century, it belonged either to the noble lords of Rötteln on the collateral line of the lords of Rotenberg, or to the margraves of Hachberg and was assigned to the circle of the Saint Blaise estates. In any case, the castle belonged to Rotenberg at that time.

A remarkable economic rise of the region occurred in the 14th and 15th centuries with the exploitation of the red colored sandstone deposits. In 1388 and 1469 the bishop of Basel had stone quarries bought up for the reconstruction of the Basel Minster, which had been destroyed in the 1356 Basel earthquake.

In 1503, control over the area with the entire margraviate of Hachberg-Sausenberg was lost to the Margraviate of Baden and was assigned to the Oberamt Rötteln. Steinen was granted market rights in 1602. It gained a cattle and grocery market at the end of the 18th century (1776) and later also a weekly market.

Due to its location along two busy country roads (the road through the Wiesental valley to Schopfheim and the old Roman road from Steinen via Hüsingen to Inzlingen and Lörrach) the village was frequently affected by war. The village was plundered by the French, particularly in 1676, 1678, and on the 25 August 1689.

As early as the 18th century Steinen began to establish itself as the seat of a Saint Blasian authority as a small centre between Schopfheim and Lörrach, which was reflected in the large number of craftsmen, the construction of middle-class houses, and in the alleys which have been paved since 1760.

During the Baden Revolution in April 1848, the troops of the Heckerzug crossed Steinen on their way to the Battle on the Scheideck. After the defeat there, parts of the rearguard platoon gathered near Steinen and united there with another revolutionary platoon under Joseph Weißhaar. Federal troops soon dispersed the revolutionaries and drove them towards the Swiss border.

=== 19th century ===
In the 19th century the old and sometimes poor farming village with its ill-kept roads and primitive houses changed its structure. This was caused by the beginning of the textile industry in the Wiesental and in Steinen. The textile industry had already started in Steinen in 1816 as homework and the first hand-weaving mill of Merian & Köchlin employed many locals. With the construction of the first factories, the former margrave farming village was industrialised almost 20 years later by the "Basler Herren", including Colonel Geigy and Director Peter Köchlin, the "King of Printing Fabrics". In 1836 the Basel colonel Wilhelm Geigy-Lichtenhahn founded the Mechanische Spinnerei und Weberei Steinen (A spinning and waving mill) with 7392 spindles and 40 mechanical looms.

The economic upswing and the textile companies established in the Wiesental towns made it necessary to transport and drive more draught animals on the roads, which had often been in poor condition. Therefore, the owners of the newly established factories (primarily the Swiss colonel Wilhelm Geigy) campaigned for the construction of the Wiesental Railway. After almost two years of construction, Steinen was connected to the railway network on 10 May 1862 with the opening of the Wiesentalbahn.

In 1899, when an electric power and light centre was created to operate a new spinning mill, the company offered the mayor's office to also take over the street lighting and the installation of the house lights: The old paraffin lamps were dismantled and Steinen was electrified.

=== 20th century ===
The two world wars left deep scars on the population: in 1935, the memorial complex was built on the former churchyard of St. Peter's Church according to the plans of the Freiburg architect Hans Geiges to honour Steinens soldiers who died in the First World War. The names of the fallen were recorded here on eight sandstone plaques. After the end of the Second World War, the memorial had to be extended by a further 13 commemorative plaques.

From an architectural point of view, Steinen survived the Second World War relatively unscathed until 16 December 1944 when the "Kramer House", which was the residence of former bailiff Scheffelt until 1849 and later housed the old town hall, was completely destroyed by bombing. The former site in Eisenbahnstraße is now home to the butcher's shop Hug.

Steinen formed an advocatus together with the villages of Höllstein, Hüsingen and Hägelberg as early as the 14th century. On 1 January 1974 Weitenau was incorporated into Steinen. On 1 October 1974 Endenburg was incorporated. Today's municipality was newly formed on 1 January 1975 by uniting the municipalities of Steinen, Hägelberg, Höllstein, Hüsingen and Schlächtenhaus. This municipal reform made Seinen the sixth largest municipality in the district of Lörrach in terms of area.

== Religion ==
With the Reformation of 1556, Steinen, like the entire Markgräflerland, became Protestand-Lutheran. Steinen's conversion from Roman Catholic to Evangelic belief to Lutheran doctrine was made possible by the accession of the sovereign Charles II, Margrave of Baden-Durlach to the Augsburg Confession. With this accession it was in the hands of the respective rulers of the Princes according to which faith their subjects had to live. Even today the majority of the population belongs to the Protestant denomination. The 2011 census showed the following distribution of religions: 48.0% Protestant – 21.8% Catholic – 30.3% no/ other denomination.

Today there is a Protestant congregation in the town cetre, in Höllstein and in Schlächtenhaus, each of which belongs to the Baden Regional Church.The Arbeitsgemeinschaft für Seelsorge e.V. (The Pastoral Care Association), which is affiliated with the regional church, has also been running the Haus Frieden in Hägelberg since 1970.

The Christus-Gemeinde in Steinen is a congregation of the small Evangelical Lutheran Church in Baden, which opposed the union of the Lutheran and Reformed confession in the Grand Duchy of Baden in the 19th century.

In Höllstein there is a Roman Catholic community rsoinsible for Steinen and Maulburg.

The Evangelische Verein für innere Mission Augsburger Bekenntnisse e.V., which belongs to the Evangelische Allianz, is also represented in the village. There is also a New Apostolic congregation, a Protestant Anabaptist congregation and the Evangelische Freikirche Steinen e.V. in the village.

== Transport ==
The town has a railway station, Steinen, on the Wiese Valley Railway.
