= Schopfheim =

- Town
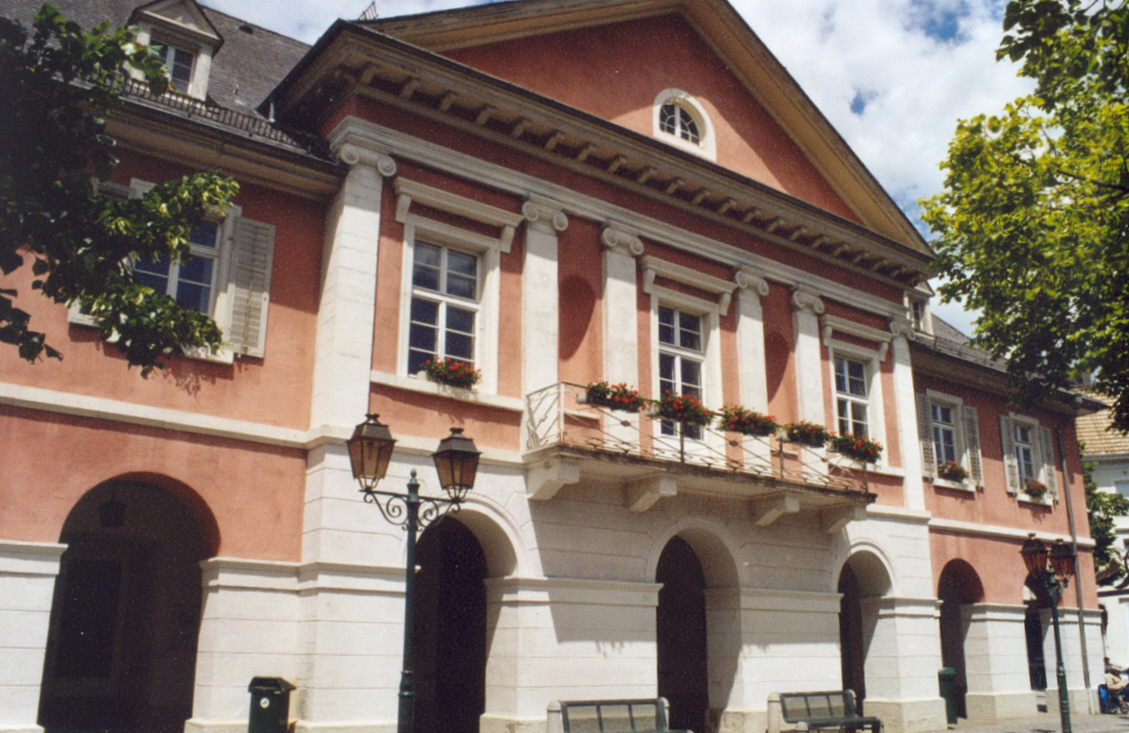
- Town hall

- Coat of arms

- Location of Schopfheim within Lörrach district
- Interactive map of Schopfheim
- Location within Germany Location within Baden-Württemberg
- Coordinates: 47°39′N 7°49′E
- Country: Germany
- State: Baden-Württemberg
- Admin. region: Freiburg
- District: Lörrach
- Subdivisions: 9

Government
  - Mayor (2018–26): Dirk Harscher

Area
  - Total: 67.94 km^{2} (26.23 sq mi)
- Elevation: 373 m (1,224 ft)

Population (2025-12-31)
  - Total: 20,198
  - Density: 297.3/km^{2} (770.0/sq mi)
- Time zone: UTC+01:00 (CET)
  - Summer (DST): UTC+02:00 (CEST)
- Postal codes: 79641–79650
- Dialling codes: 07622
- Vehicle registration: LÖ
- Website: www.schopfheim.de

Schopfheim (German pronunciation: [ˈʃɔpfhaɪm]) is a town in the district of Lörrach in Baden-Württemberg, Germany. It is situated on the river Wiese, 10 km north of Rheinfelden, and 13 km east of Lörrach.

The town is the birthplace of Gisela Oeri, Max Picard, Helmut Hauser, Thomas Hauser, Arwed Messmer, Nicole Grether and Arno Villringer.

== Transport ==
The Wiese Valley Railway runs through the town and serves four stations: Schopfheim West, Schopfheim, Schopfheim-Schlattholz, and Fahrnau. The nearest airport is EuroAirport Basel Mulhouse Freiburg, located 30 km (19 mi) south west of the town. Zurich Airport can also be reached, it is located 79 km (49 mi) which is an hour drive south east of Schopfheim.

== Gallery ==
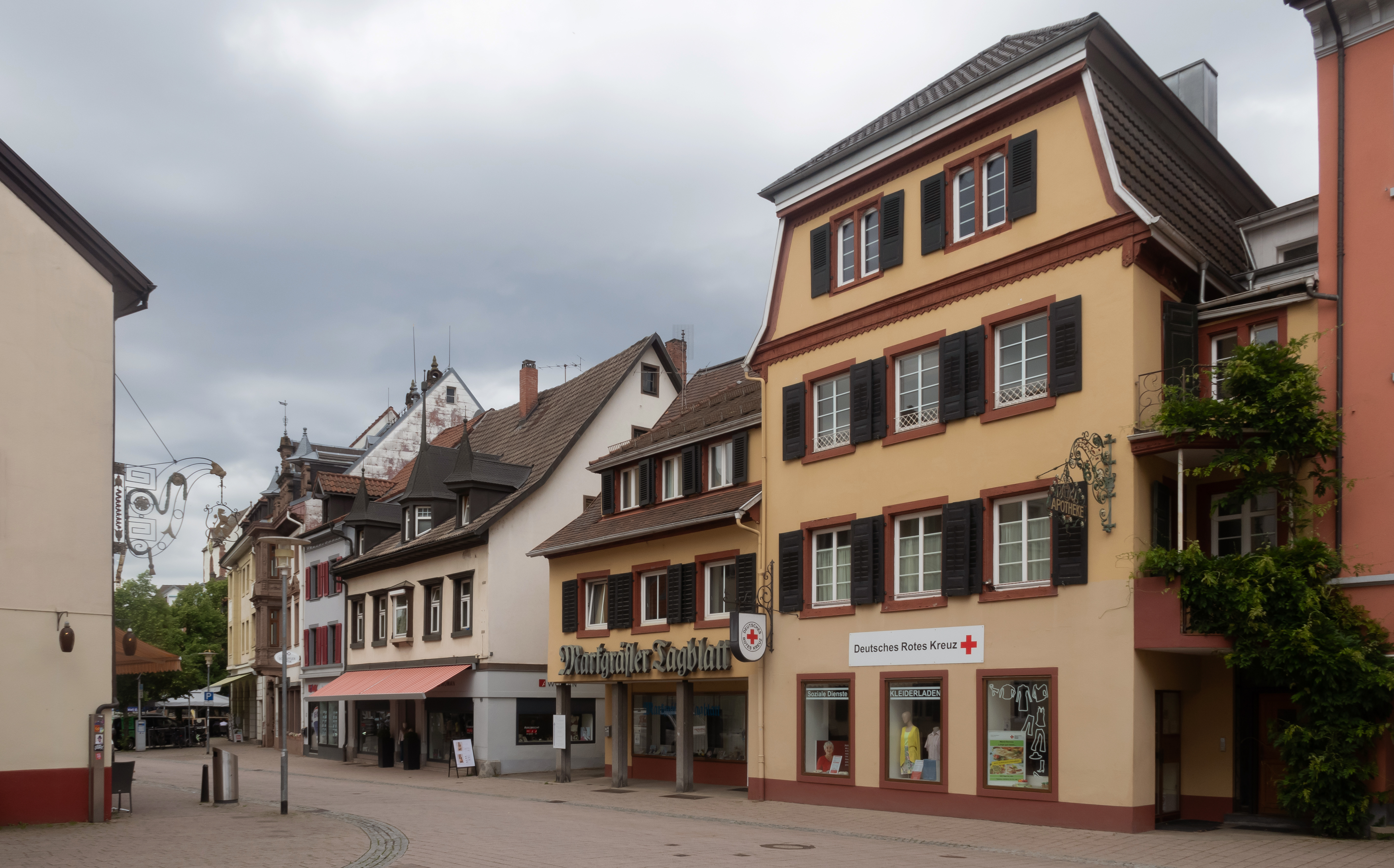
Street view Hauptstrasse

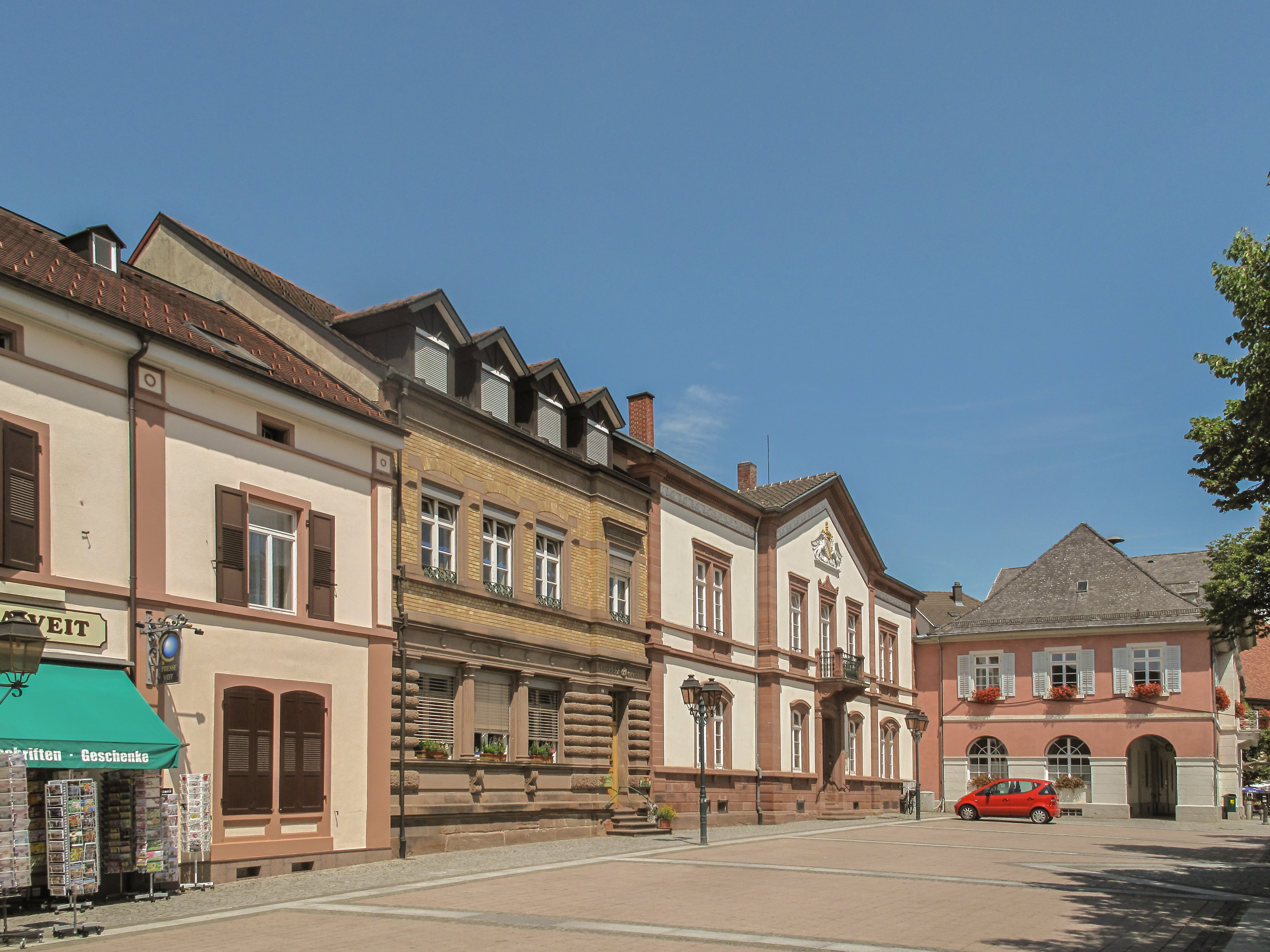
Market square

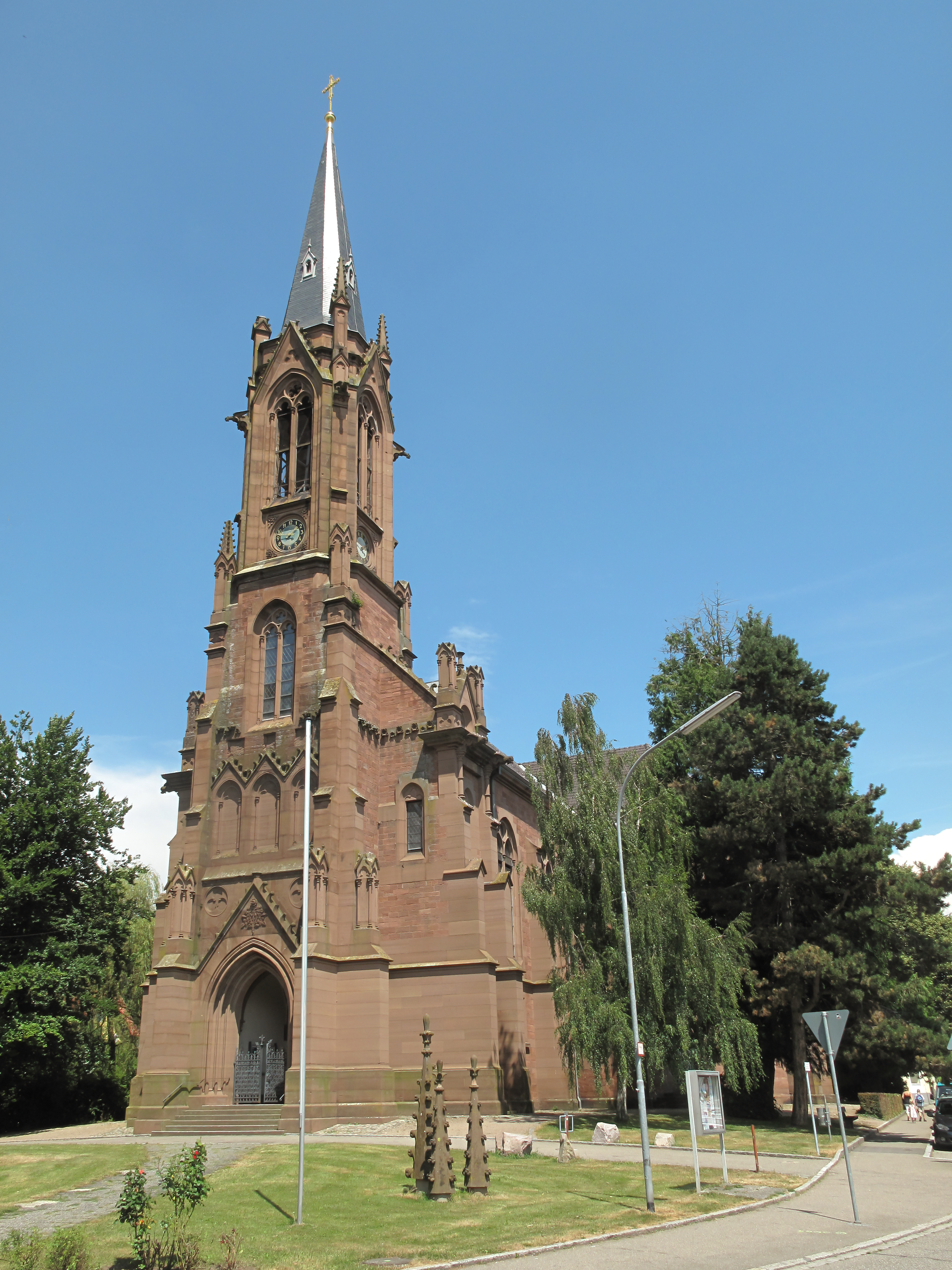
Reformed church

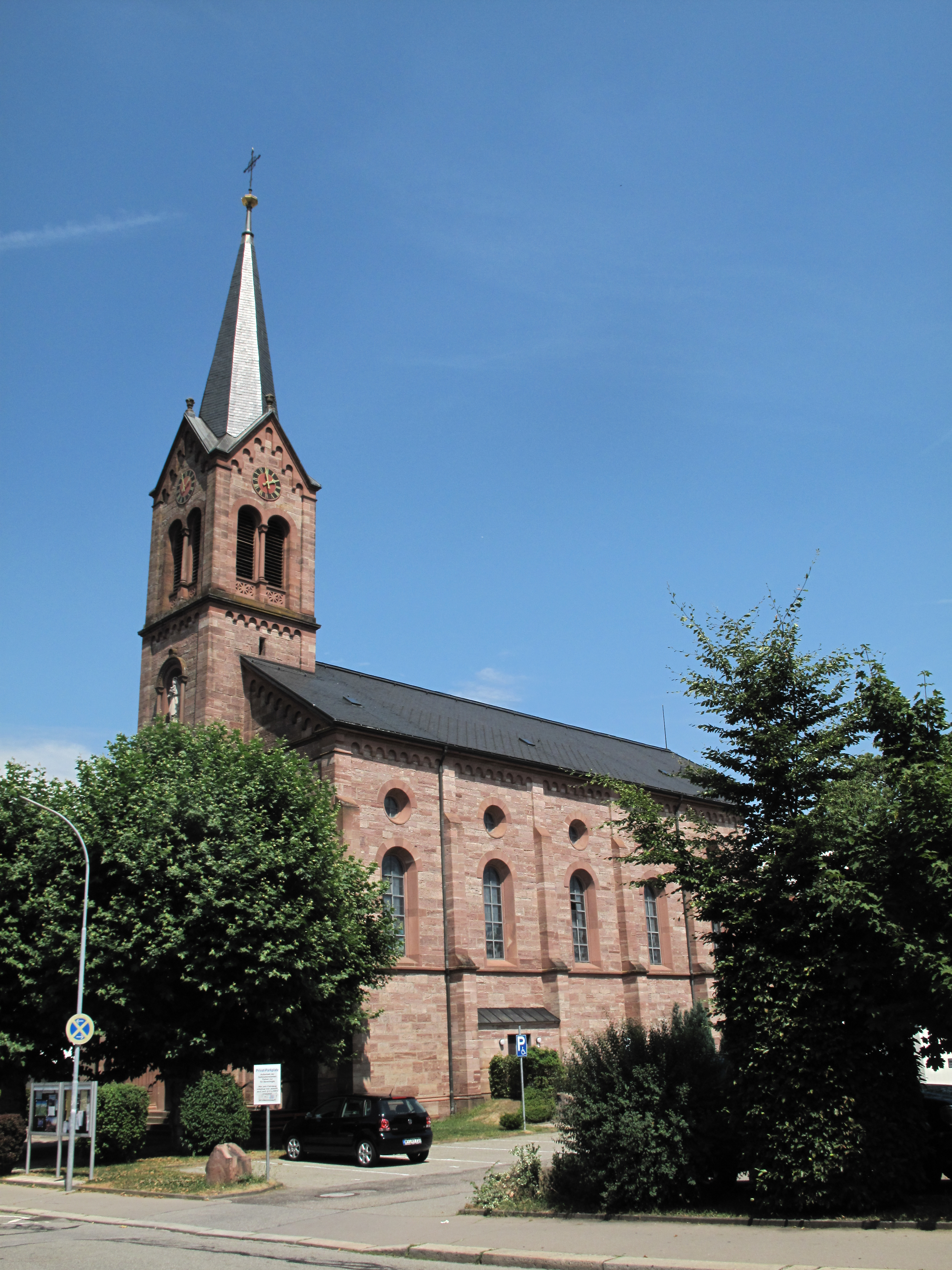
Catholic church
