= Weil am Rhein station =

Railway junction in Baden-Württemberg, Germany

Weil am Rhein
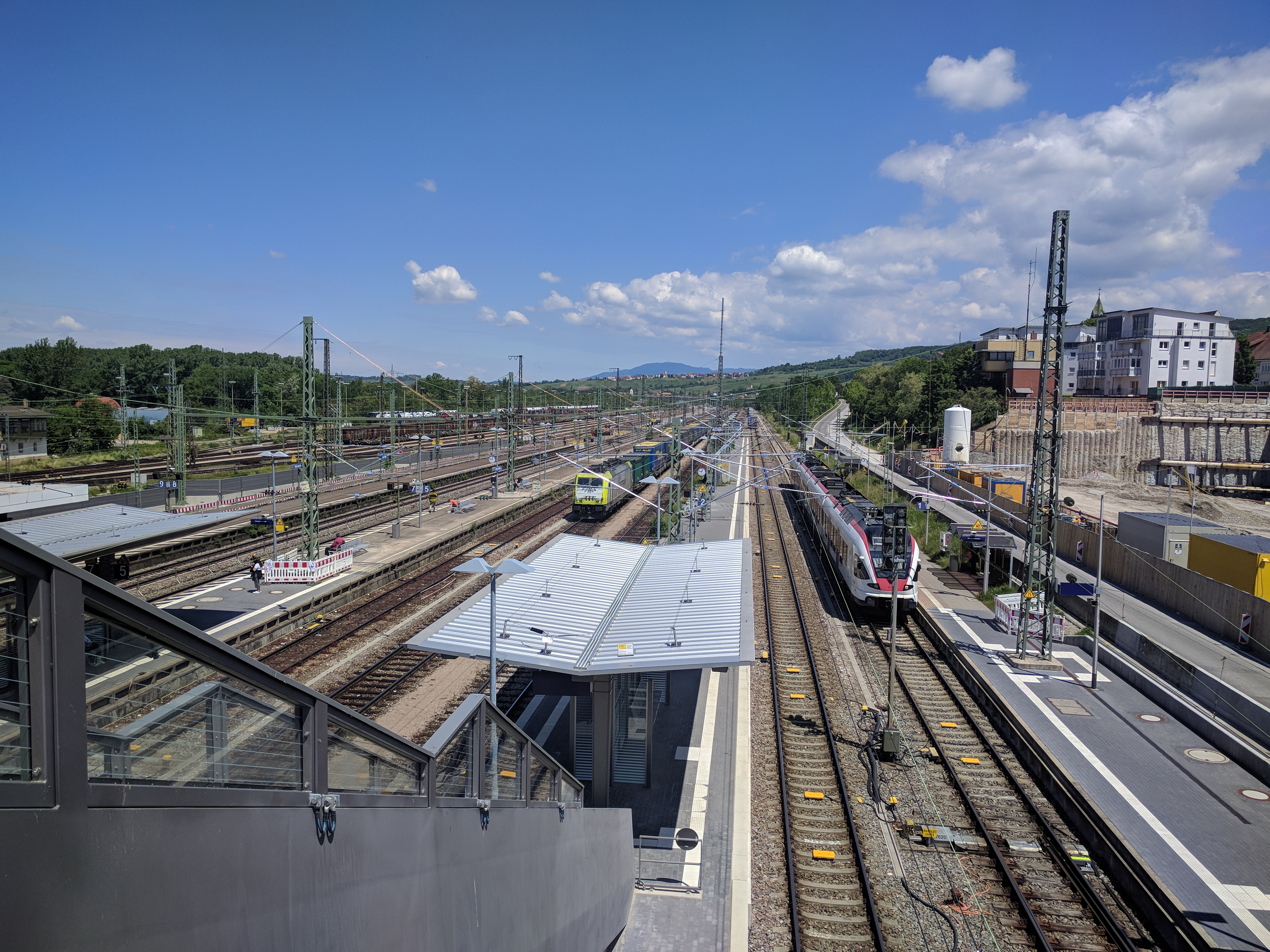
- The station platforms in 2019

General information
- Location: Hauptstraße 339; Weil am Rhein, Baden-Württemberg; Germany
- Coordinates: 47°35′38″N 7°36′30″E
- Owner: Deutsche Bahn
- Lines: Rhine Valley Railway (KBS 702); Weil am Rhein–Lörrach line (KBS 734); Weil am Rhein–Saint-Louis line (closed)
- Distance: 267.6 km (166.3 mi) from Mannheim Hauptbahnhof
- Platforms: 3 island platforms; 1 side platform
- Tracks: 6
- Train operators: DB Fernverkehr; DB Regio Baden-Württemberg; SBB GmbH
- Connections: Tram line 8; SWEG bus lines

Construction
- Accessible: Yes (except platforms 8 & 9)

Other information
- Station code: 6606
- DS100 code: RW
- IBNR: 80006606
- Category: 4
- Fare zone: 3 (RVL)
- Website: www.bahnhof.de

History
- Opened: 20 February 1855

Services
Preceding station	DB Fernverkehr	Following station
Müllheim (Baden) towards München Hbf	ICE 60	Basel Bad Bf towards Basel SBB
Preceding station	DB Regio Baden-Württemberg	Following station
Müllheim (Baden) towards Karlsruhe Hbf	RE 7	Basel Bad Bf Terminus
Haltingen towards Emmendingen	RB 27	Basel Bad Bf Terminus
Preceding station	Basel S-Bahn	Following station
Terminus	S5	Weil am Rhein Gartenstadt towards Zell (Wiesental)
Location
- Location within Baden-Württemberg Location within Germany

Weil am Rhein station is a small railway junction in Weil am Rhein in the German state of Baden-Württemberg on the German-Swiss border. The Weil am Rhein–Lörrach railway (known as the Gartenbahn—"Garden Railway") branches off the Mannheim–Karlsruhe–Basel railway (Rhine Valley Railway) at the station. From 1878 to 1937, the station was the starting point of the Weil am Rhein–Saint-Louis line to the French town of Saint-Louis.

== History ==
The Rhine Valley Railway was completed in 1855 with the opening of the Haltingen–Basel section through Weil am Rhein. Weil am Rhein station was established at the same time.

The Weil am Rhine–Lörrach railway was opened on 20 May 1890 by the Grand Duchy of Baden State Railway as part of a strategic railway to bypass Switzerland. A railway line had already been opened on 11 February 1878 between Weil am Rhein and Saint-Louis, providing a connection from Alsace (which had been captured from France in the Franco-Prussian War in 1870) to the far south of the German Empire.

The Basel-Weil marshalling yard was opened in 1913.

The Basel Badischer Bahnhof – Weil am Rhein – Efringen-Kirchen section of the Rhine Valley Railway and the whole of the Weil am Rhine–Lörrach railway were electrified in 1952.

The original station building was demolished in 1996.

The Weil am Rhine–Lörrach railway was included in the trinational Basel Regional S-Bahn as line S5 from the introduction of the 2004/2005 timetable on 12 December 2004. Services on the line have been operated since 15 June 2003 by SBB GmbH, the German subsidiary of the Swiss Federal Railways (SBB).

Since the timetable change in 2013/2014, SBB GmbH has operated a pair of trains on the Basel SBB – Weil am Rhein – Efringen-Kirchen route, closing an existing gap in the timetable to provide an hourly service.

Since the timetable change on 14 December 2014, Basel tram line 8 has run from its former terminus in Kleinhüningen via Friedlingen to Weil am Rhein station (Weil am Rhein Bahnhof/Zentrum tram stop).

Next to the passenger station is the now disused marshalling yard, which has been rebuilt as a container terminal.

== Platforms ==
Weil am Rhein station has an extensive system of tracks and platform facilities for passengers. Except for track 1 (next to the demolished station building), all tracks have an entry height of 76 centimetres (30 in), which provides reasonable access to the trains. Platform 1 has a step height of 55 centimetres (22 in), which provides barrier-free entry to the S-Bahn trains that begin and end there.

Between tracks 3 and 5 is track 4, which has no platform and is used for freight trains running through. Tracks 10 to 14, which also have no platforms, are abandoned; tracks 15 to 17 run to the Basel-Muttenz marshalling yard.

Platforms
Tracks	Usable length	Height	Current use
1	149 m	55 cm	Services towards Lörrach (S5)
2	239 m	76 cm	Services towards Lörrach (vereinzelt)
3	239 m	76 cm	Former siding, platform edge closed since early 2015
5	203 m	76 cm	Siding for services towards Müllheim/Freiburg/Offenburg
7	258 m	76 cm	Services towards Müllheim/Freiburg/Offenburg
8	180 m	76 cm	Services towards Basel
9	180 m	76 cm	Siding for services towards Basel

== Transport services ==
Weil am Rhein is located in the fare zone of the Regio Verkehrsverbund Lörrach (Regional transport association of Lörrach, RVL). Tarifverbund Nordwestschweiz (tariff association of north-west Switzerland, TNW) fares are honoured towards Basel. Toward Freiburg, Regio Verkehrsverbund Lörrach fares apply from Auggen.

=== Long distance services ===
Since 13 December 2015, Weil am Rhein has been served by a daily InterCity service (the Baden-Kurier) on the route between Basel Bad and Munich.

Connection	Line	Frequency	Operator
ICE 60	Baden-Kurier:Basel SBB – Basel Bad Bf – Offenburg – Karlsruhe – Bruchsal – Stuttgart – Ulm – Augsburg – München	1 train pair	DB Fernverkehr

=== Regional services ===
The town is on line S5 line of Basel S-Bahn, which connects to Lörrach, Steinen, Schopfheim and Zell (Wiesental). Regional-Express and Regionalbahn services also connect with Basel, Freiburg and Offenburg. The S-Bahn and the Regional-Express services operate hourly and there are additional services in the peak hours.

Connection	Line	Frequency	Operator
RE 7	Basel Bad Bf – Weil am Rhein – Müllheim – Freiburg – Emmendingen – Herbolzheim – Lahr – Offenburg – Baden-Baden – Karlsruhe	60 min	DB Regio Baden-Württemberg
RE 27	Basel Bad Bf – Weil am Rhein – Müllheim – Freiburg	single service on Sat, Sun	DB Regio Baden-Württemberg
RB 27	Basel Bad Bf – Weil am Rhein – Müllheim – Freiburg – Lahr – Offenburg	60 min	DB Regio Baden-Württemberg
S5	Weil am Rhein – Lörrach – Schopfheim – Zell (Wiesental)	30 min peak, 60 min	SBB

=== Connections ===
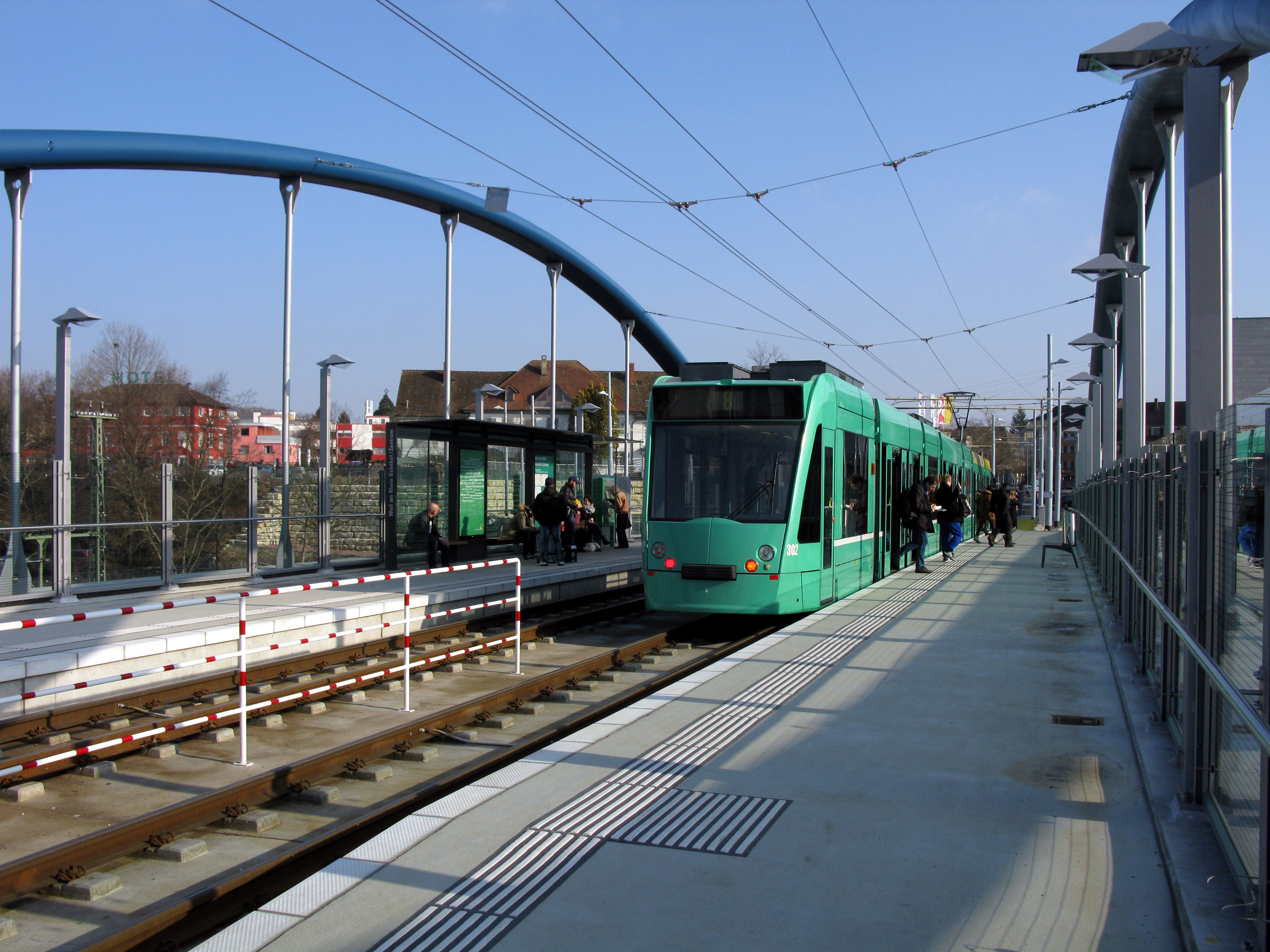
Weil am Rhein Bahnhof/Zentrum tram stop on Basel tram line 8

Tram line 8 connects Weil am Rhein station with Kleinhüningen and Basel's city centre at 15-minute intervals and since late 2014 the tramline has terminated on a bridge built parallel with the Friedensbrücke ("Peace Bridge") above Weil am Rhein station.

8	Weil am Rhein – Kleinhüningen – Schifflände –Basel SBB – Neuweilerstrasse

The Weil am Rhein Bahnhof/Zentrum bus stop is served by some local and regional buses operated by Südwestdeutsche Verkehrs-Aktiengesellschaft (SWEG). Bus route 55 provides another connection to Basel.

== See also ==
- Rail transport in Germany
