= Zell (Wiesental) station =

Railway station in Zell im Wiesental, Germany

Zell (Wiesental)
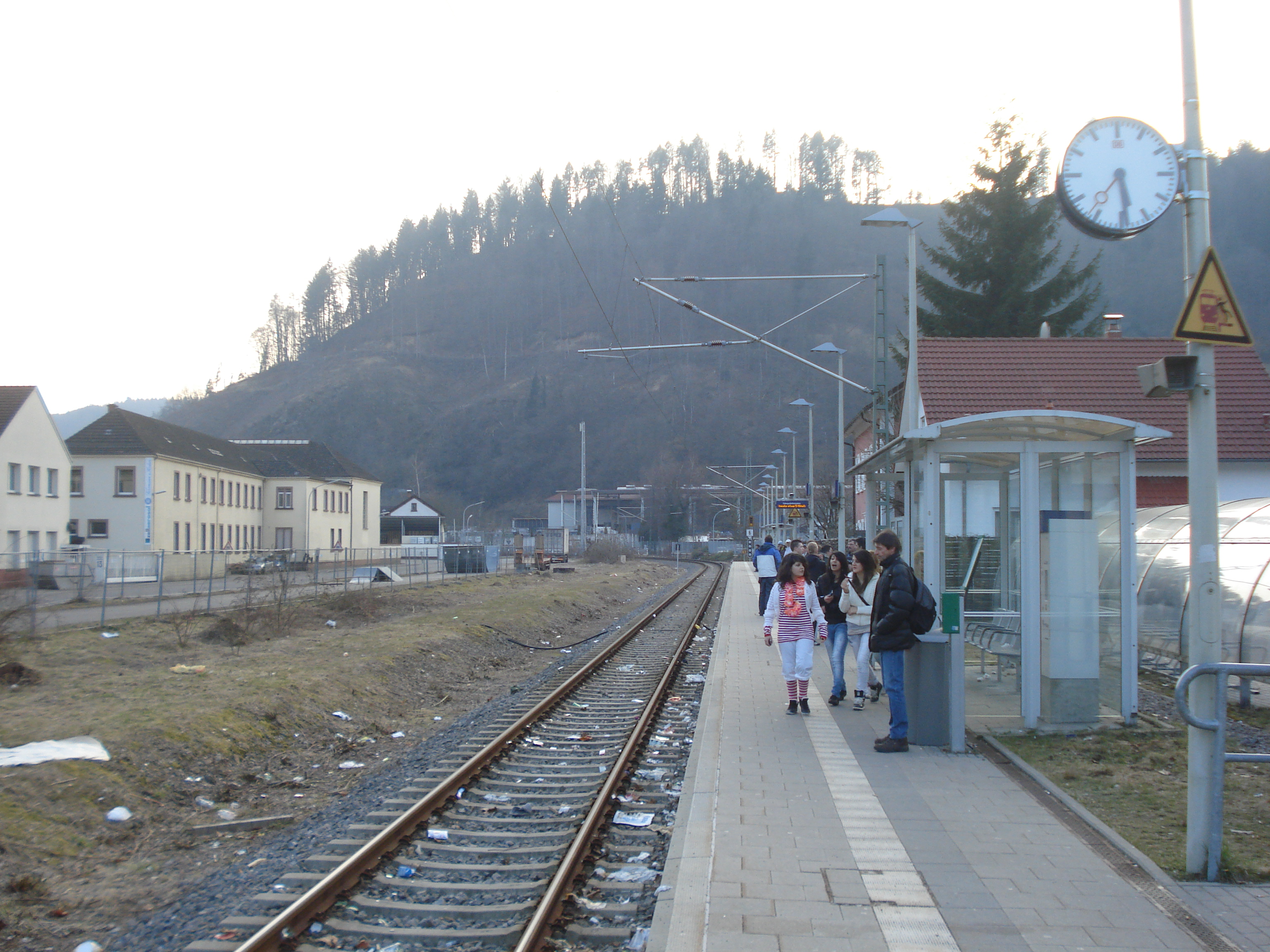
- The station platform in 2011

General information
- Location: Bahnhofstr. 17; Zell im Wiesental, Baden-Württemberg; Germany
- Coordinates: 47°42′20″N 7°50′57″E
- Owner: Deutsche Bahn
- Operator: DB Station&Service
- Lines: Wiese Valley Railway (KBS 735); Zell im Wiesental–Todtnau railway (closed)
- Distance: 27.2 km (16.9 mi) from Basel Bad Bf
- Platforms: 1 side platform
- Tracks: 1
- Train operators: SBB GmbH
- Connections: Südbadenbus bus lines

Construction
- Accessible: Yes

Other information
- Station code: 6988
- DS100 code: RZ
- IBNR: 8006988
- Category: 6
- Fare zone: 7 (RVL)
- Website: www.bahnhof.de

History
- Opened: 5 June 1876
- Electrified: 13 September 1913

Services
Preceding station	Basel S-Bahn	Following station
Hausen-Raitbach towards Weil am Rhein	S5 Limited service	Terminus
Hausen-Raitbach towards Basel SBB	S6	Terminus
Location

Zell (Wiesental) station is the only station in Zell im Wiesental in the German state of Baden-Württemberg and the terminus of the Wiese Valley Railway (Wiesentalbahn), which runs from Basel Badischer Bahnhof. Since the summer of 2003, Zell station has been served only by the Basel Regional S-Bahn.

== History ==
After the opening of the line between Basel and Schopfheim in 1862 by the Wiese Valley Railway Company (Wiesenthalbahn-Gesellschaft) from the Badischen Bahnhof (Baden station) in Basel, the line was extended to Zell on 5 June 1876 by the Schopfheim-Zell Railway Company (Schopfheim-Zeller Eisenbahn-Gesellschaft). This was followed on 7 July 1889 by a 1,000 mm (3 ft 3 3/8 in) metre gauge railway owned by the Baden railway consortium of Herrmann Bachstein, later called the South German Railway Company (Süddeutsche Eisenbahn-Gesellschaft AG), the Zell im Wiesental–Todtnau railway, known as the Upper Wiese Valley Railway (Obere Wiesentalbahn) and also as the Todtnauerli.

Passenger services on the 19 km-long narrow gauge railway Zell (Wiesental)–Todtnau were abandoned on 25 September 1966 and freight services on the line were closed on 24 September 1967. Shortly afterwards, the tracks were completely dismantled.

On 15 June 2003, traffic on the Basel–Zell line was taken over by SBB GmbH, the German passenger transport subsidiary of Swiss Federal Railways (SBB), and integrated into the network of the Basel Regional S-Bahn. Simultaneously, the status of Zell station was downgraded at this time from a station to a halt (Haltepunkt). It is now served only by S-Bahn lines S5 and S6.

== Infrastructure ==
The entrance building of Zell station is now privately owned and is no longer used for railway purposes.

Since the incorporation of the Wiese Valley Railway in the Basel Regional S-Bahn, Zell station has only had a single track with a platform next to the entrance building. The track ends at a buffer at the end of the platform.

Directly in front of the platform next to the entrance building there are two bus stops, which are served by buses to the surrounding communities, including along the former railway line to Todtnau.

== Services ==
Zell im Wiesental belongs to the area where public transport is organised by the Regio Verkehrsverbund Lörrach (Regional transport association of Lörrach, RVL). The transitional fares of Tarifverbund Nordwestschweiz (Tariff association of Northwestern Switzerland, TNW) are honoured in Basel.

As of the December 2020 timetable change, the following rail services stop at Zell (Wiesental):

- Basel S-Bahn:
  - S5: hourly service to Weil am Rhein on Sundays.
  - S6: half-hourly service to Basel SBB.

In addition, some local and regional bus services run from Zell station.
