= Wiese Valley Railway =

Railway line in Germany and Switzerland

Overview
- Native name: Wiesentalbahn
- Owner: DB (infrastructure)
- Line number: S6 (Basel trinational S-Bahn); 4400 (DB); 501 (SBB CFF FFS)
- Locale: Baden-Württemberg, Germany, Basel-Stadt, Switzerland
- Termini: Basel Bad Bf; Zell (Wiesental)

Service
- Type: Suburban railway
- System: DB; Basel trinational S-Bahn
- Route number: 735
- Operator(s): SBB CFF FFS (Swiss Federal Railways)

Technical
- Line length: 28.8 km (17.9 mi)
- Number of tracks: 2
- Track gauge: 1,435 mm (4 ft 8 1/2 in) standard gauge
- Minimum radius: 300 m (980 ft)
- Electrification: 15 kV/16.7 Hz AC overhead catenary
- Maximum incline: 1.1%

The Wiese Valley Railway (German: Wiesentalbahn) is a 27.2 km long, electrified main line in German Baden-Württemberg in the tri-national area of Germany, Switzerland and France near the Swiss city of Basel. It is part of the Basel trinational S-Bahn and referenced as S6. It runs alongside the river Wiese from Basel Badischer Bahnhof in Basel (on Swiss territory) to Zell (Wiesental). It is operated by the Swiss Federal Railways (SBB CFF FFS)

== History ==
The line was built as the first private railway in the Grand Duchy of Baden by the Wiese Valley Railway Company (Wiesenthalbahn-Gesellschaft) and opened on 7 June 1862 to Schopfheim with a length of 20 km. It was continued up the valley as the Hintere Wiesenthalbahn (“rear” Wiese Valley Railway) on 5 February 1876 by the Schopfheim-Zell Railway Company (Schopfheim-Zeller Eisenbahn-Gesellschaft).

This was followed on 7 July 1889 by a narrow-gauge railway owned by the Baden railway consortium of Herrmann Bachstein, later called the South German Railway Company (Süddeutsche Eisenbahn-Gesellschaft AG), the Zell im Wiesental–Todtnau railway, known as the Upper Wiese Valley Railway (Obere Wiesentalbahn) and also as the Todtnauerli.

Because the German Empire demanded that the Grand Duchy of Baden construct an efficient railway from Weil am Rhein to Säckingen for military reasons (in order to avoid crossing Switzerland), including the existing Lörrach–Schopfheim section, all of the line from Basel to Zell was taken over by the Baden government and incorporated it into the Grand Duchy of Baden State Railway. The transfer of ownership took place to Schopfheim on 1 January 1889 and a year later to Zell. It was one of the first lines in Germany to be electrified in 1913, together with the Wehra Valley Railway (Wehratalbahn), as a result of its strategic importance and the abundant hydroelectricity available nearby.

The railway came to be heavily used by commuting workers, active in the factories of the Wiese Valley. Particularly high ticket sales were made at the stations of Lörrach, Stetten, Steinen and Brombach. At the latter alone 136,036 tickets were sold in 1924.

== Current operations ==
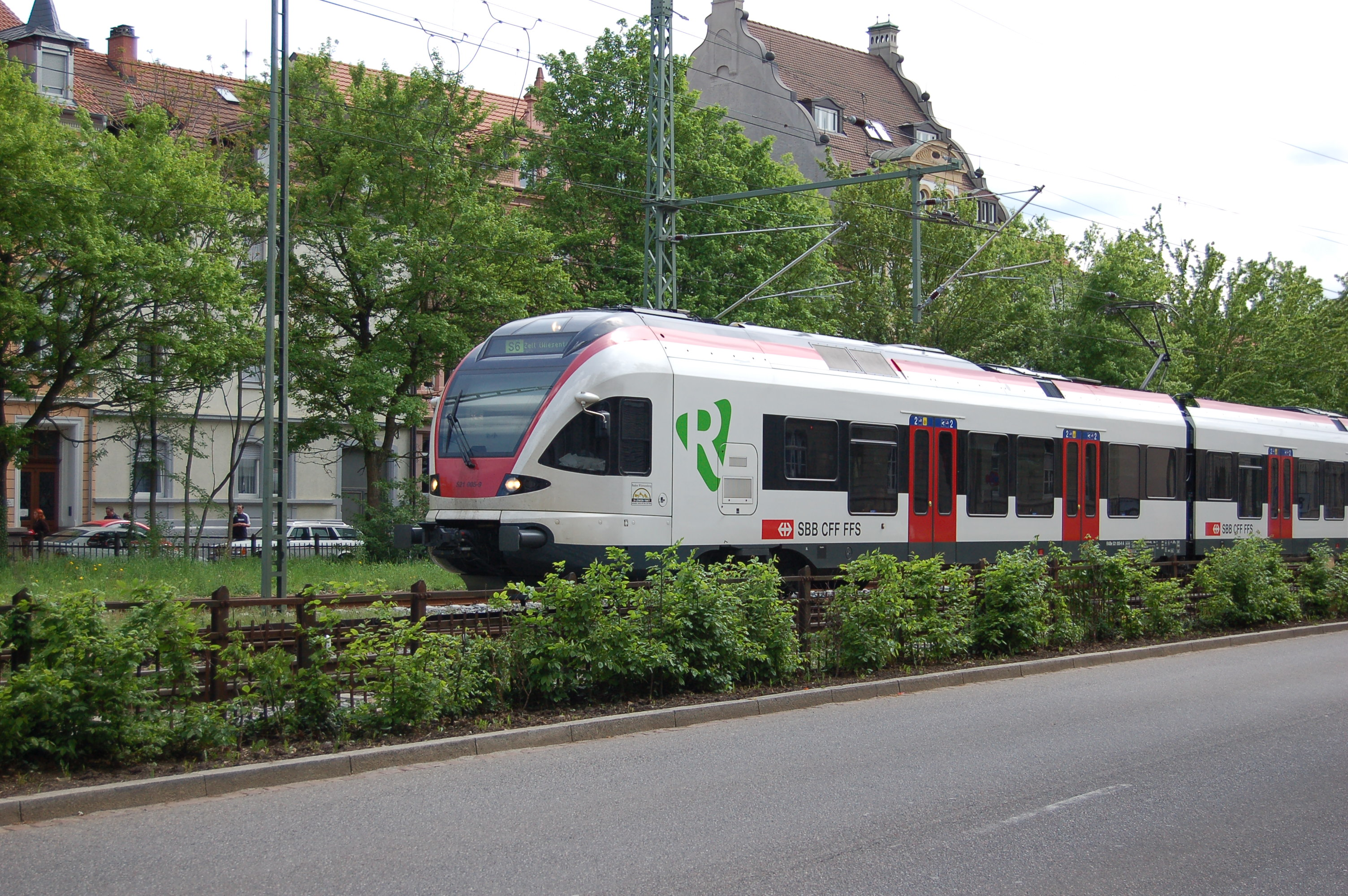
A Flirt in Lörrach

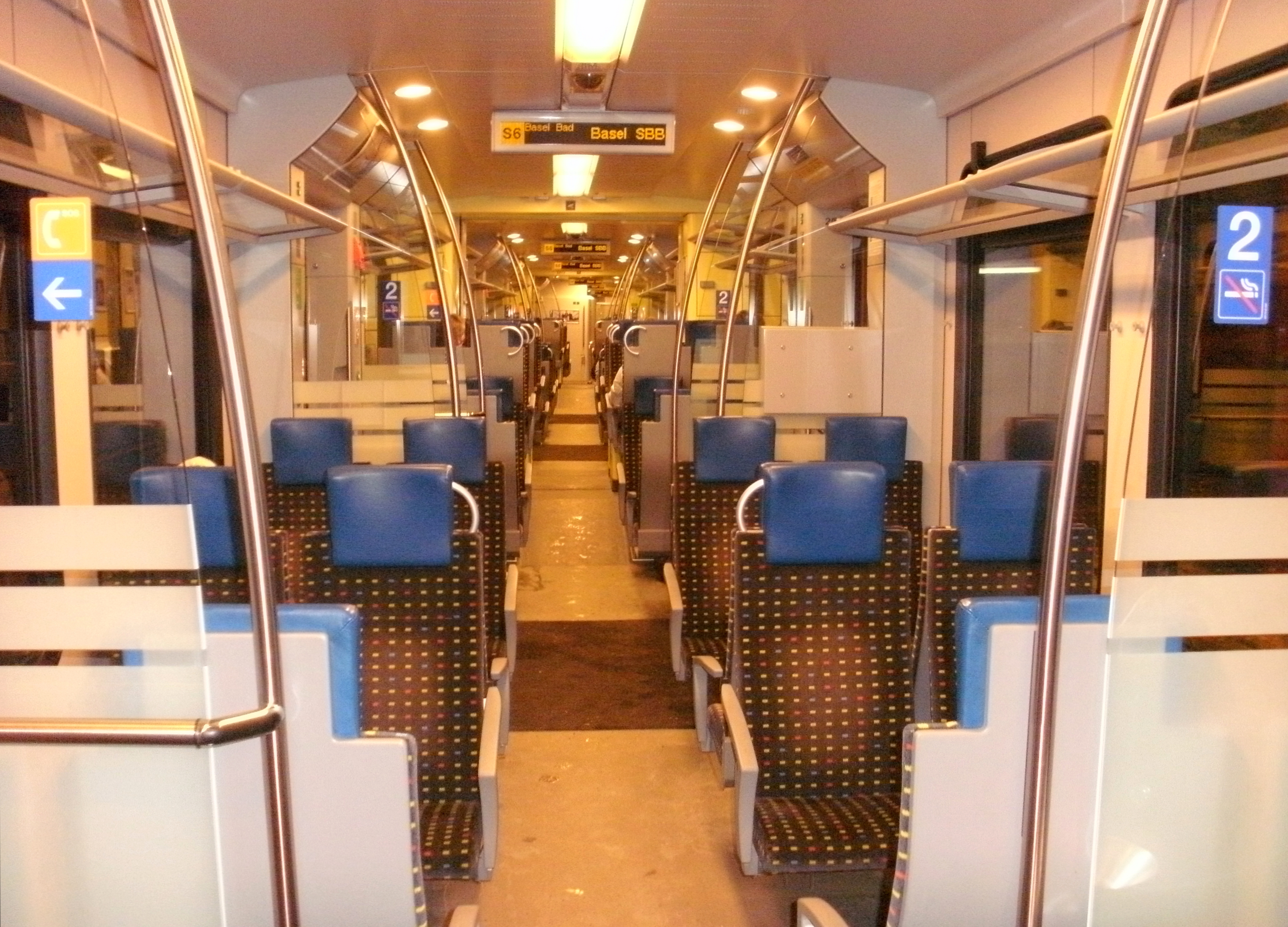
Interior of a Flirt on the Wiese Valley Railway

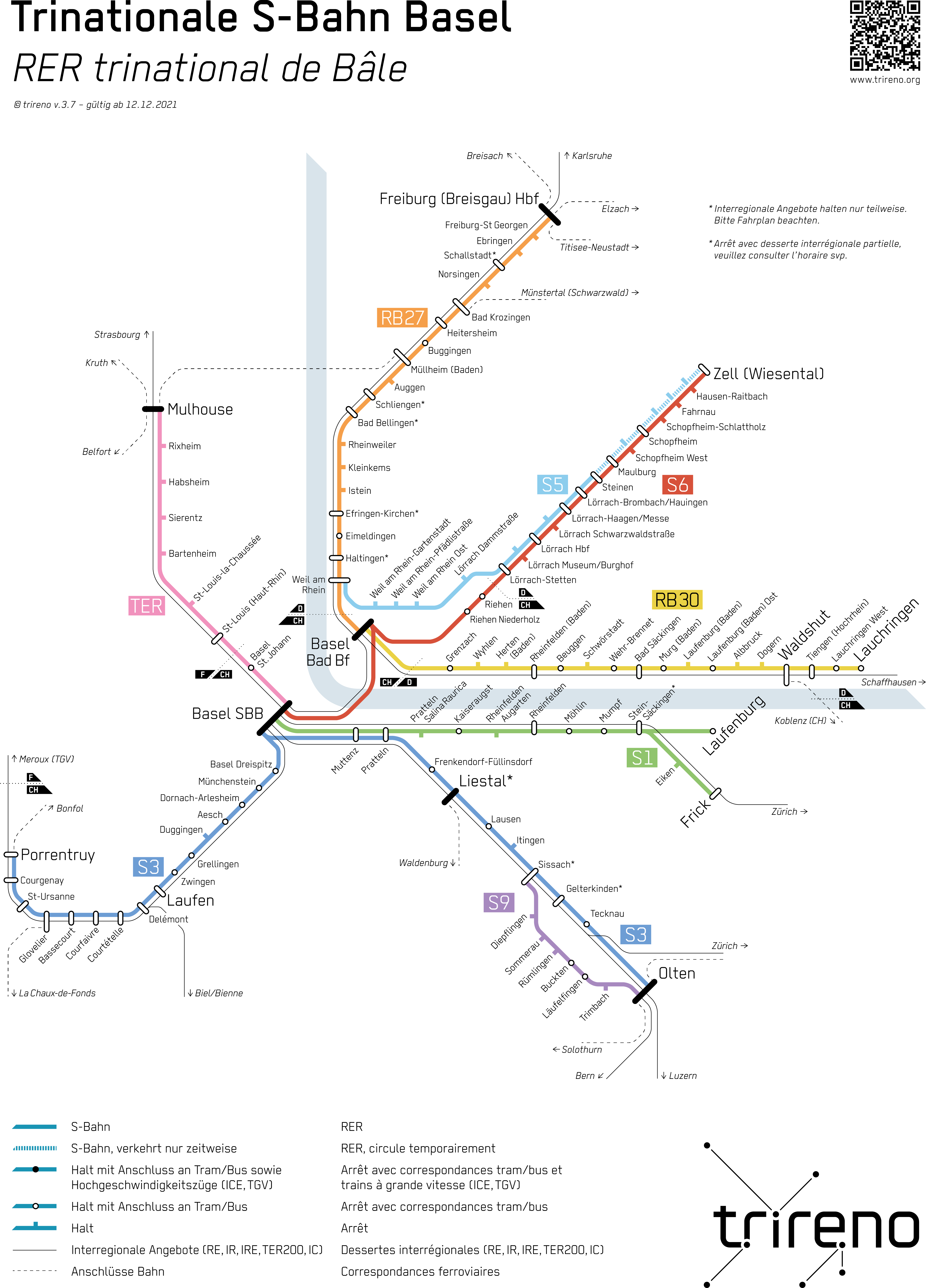
The Wiese Valley Railway in the network of the Basel trinational S-Bahn

Today, the Wiese Valley Railway is part of the network of Deutsche Bahn, but passenger services have been operated since 15 June 2003 by SBB GmbH, the German passenger transport subsidiary of Swiss Federal Railways (SBB). Between 2003 and 2005 massive modernisation of the line was carried out. With the exception of some residual freight transport and the carriage of cars to Lörrach, the line has changed to an almost pure S-Bahn line without freight. Passenger services on the line are now operated as line S 6 of the Basel trinational S-Bahn.

In the summer of 2004, the section from Lörrach-Stetten to Haagen was duplicated so that line S 5 services on the Weil am Rhein–Lörrach railway (known as the Garden Railway, Gartenbahn) could be extended to Steinen. The modernisation of the stations included the building of 55 cm high platforms (for low floor rolling stock) with a minimum length of 150 metres for coupled Stadler FLIRT electric multiple units. With the loss of freight traffic, track work was rationalised, particularly at Schopfheim, Lörrach and Maulburg. A new electronic interlocking (ESTW) now controls the entire route of the Wiese Valley Railway from Lörrach to the Swiss border and the Garden Railway from Lörrach-Stetten to the middle of Tüllinger tunnel. Most of the changes were completed and handed over for operations by the end of 2004.

With the timetable change on 12 December 2004, line S5 was extended from Lörrach to Steinen and services on the Lörrach-Stetten-Steinen section, including S6 services, now operate at quarter-hour intervals during the day. In addition, the new halt of Lörrach-Schillerstraße was opened.

Since the autumn of 2005, services on the line have been operated by trains by Stadler FLIRT electric multiple units (SBB class RABe 521), which in March 2006 replaced the last of the Neuer Pendelzug ("New Commuter Train", NPZ) train sets, which included RBDe 561 carriages, and were modified for use in Germany as an interim solution.

On 9 December 2007, the halts of Schopfheim West and Lörrach-Schwarzwaldstraße were opened and Riehen-Niederholz halt followed on 14 December 2008.

At the timetable change of 13 December 2009, the names of the following stations were changed: Schillerstraße to Lörrach Museum/Burghof, Lörrach to Lörrach Hauptbahnhof, Haagen (Baden) to Lörrach-Haagen/Messe and Brombach (b Lörrach) to Lörrach-Brombach/Hauingen.

Lörrach Hauptbahnhof was used by around 3,500 passengers daily in 2009, making it the busiest in the Wiese valley. In 2010, it received a system for displaying dynamic passenger information. All other stations on the Wiese Valley Railway are programmed to have platforms electronic destination indicators installed.
