= Dinkelberg =

Hill range in Germany

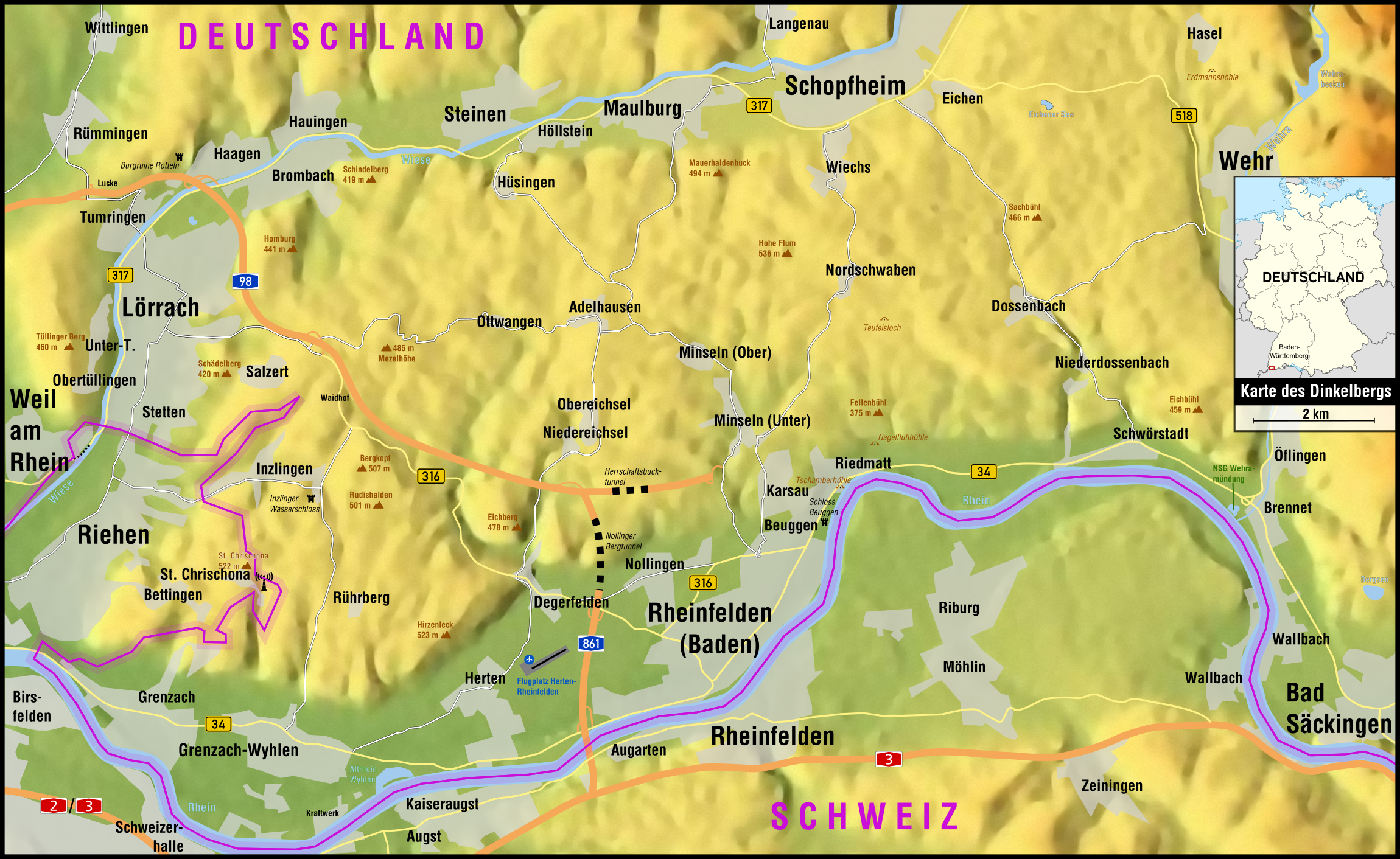
- Dinkelberg between Wiese valley in the northwest and north, the Wehra valley in the east and the Rhine valley in the south and southwest

Highest point
- Peak: Hohe Flum
- Elevation: 536.2 m above NHN

Geography
- Location within Baden-Württemberg
- State(s): Counties of Lörrach and Waldshut; Baden-Württemberg (Germany) and canton of Basel-Stadt (Switzerland)
- Range coordinates: 47°37′36″N 7°48′40″E

Geology
- Rock type(s): Keuper and muschelkalk

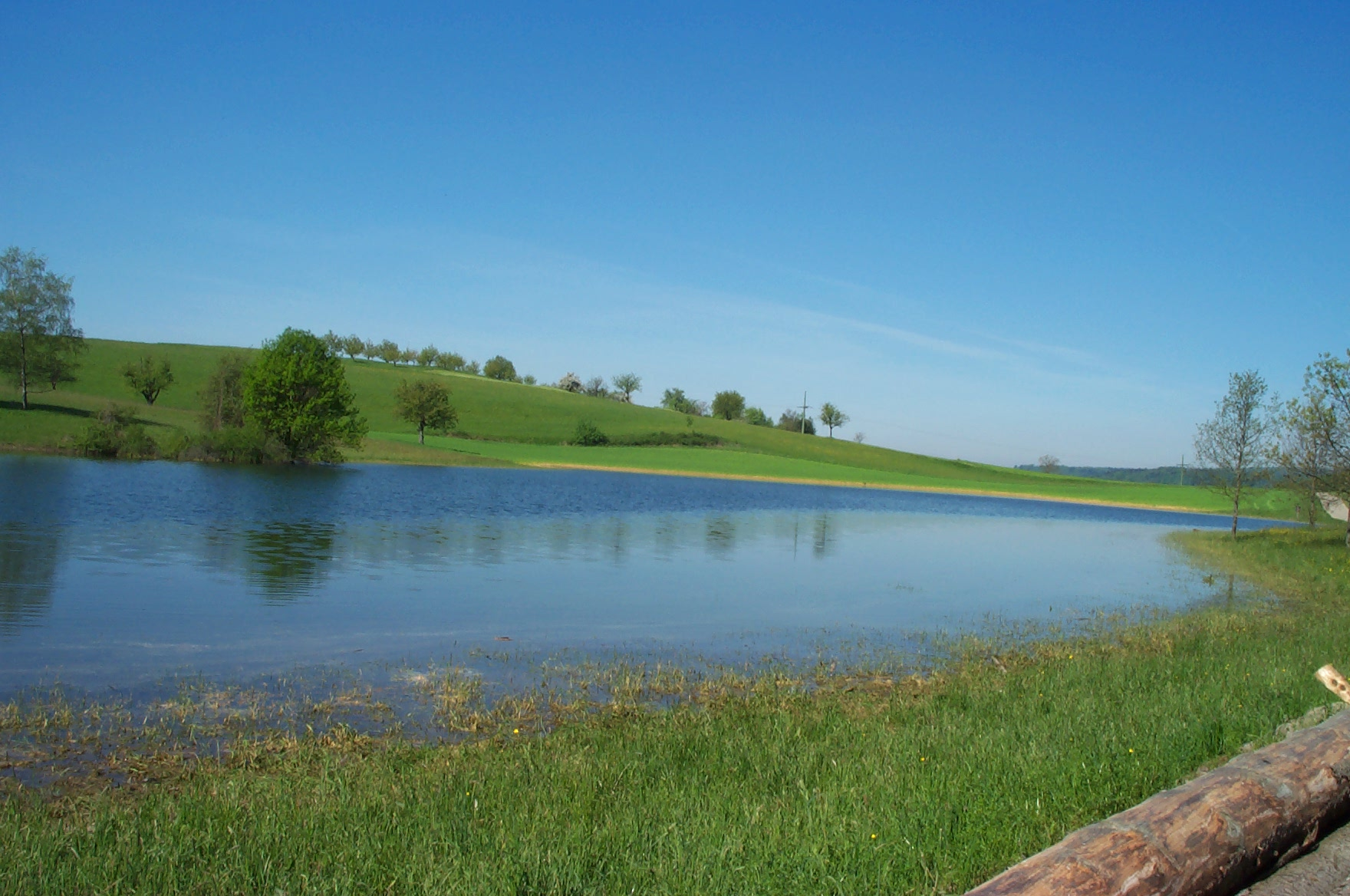
The Eichener See

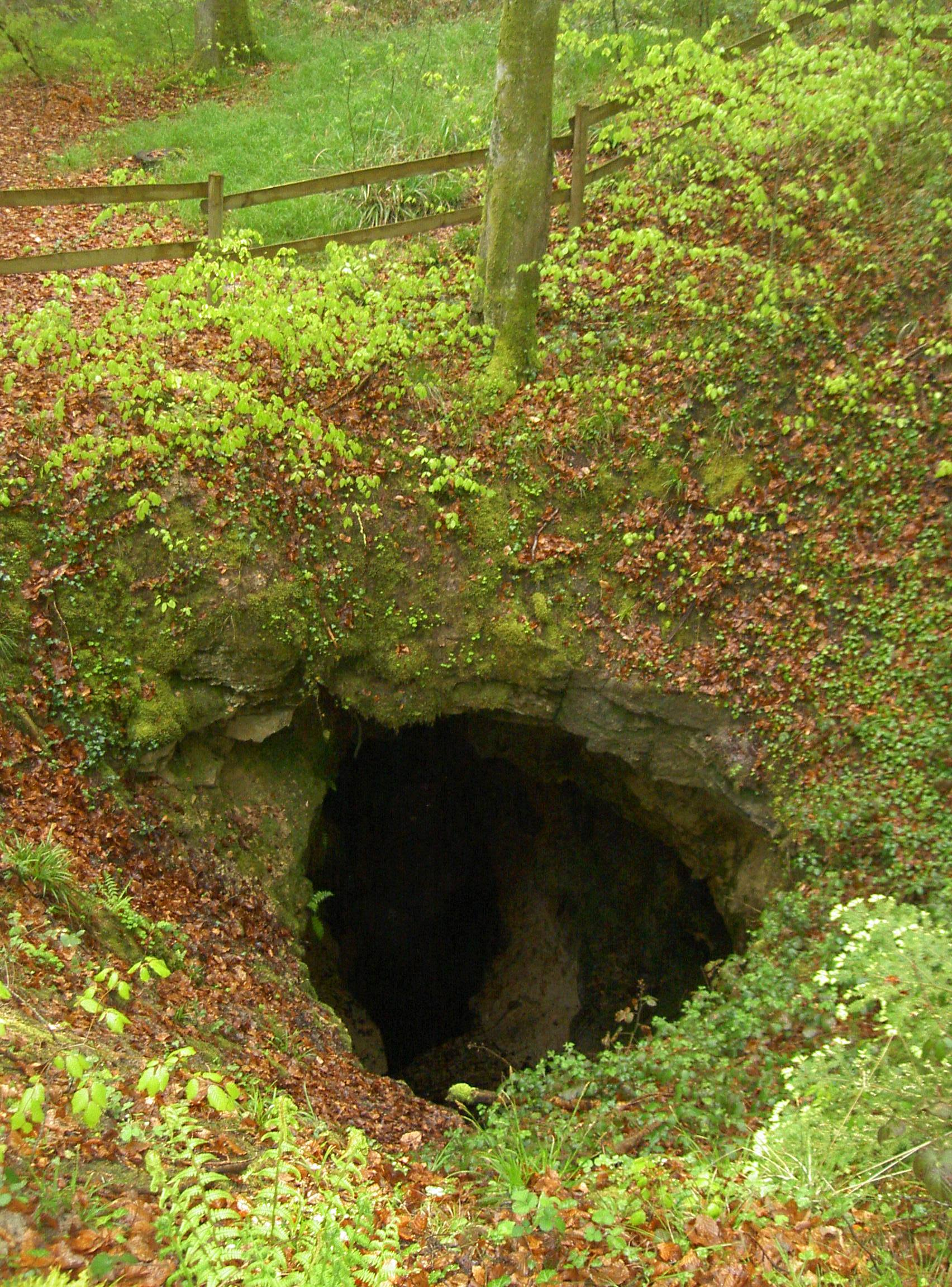
The Teufelsloch, a funnel Doline near Nordschwaben

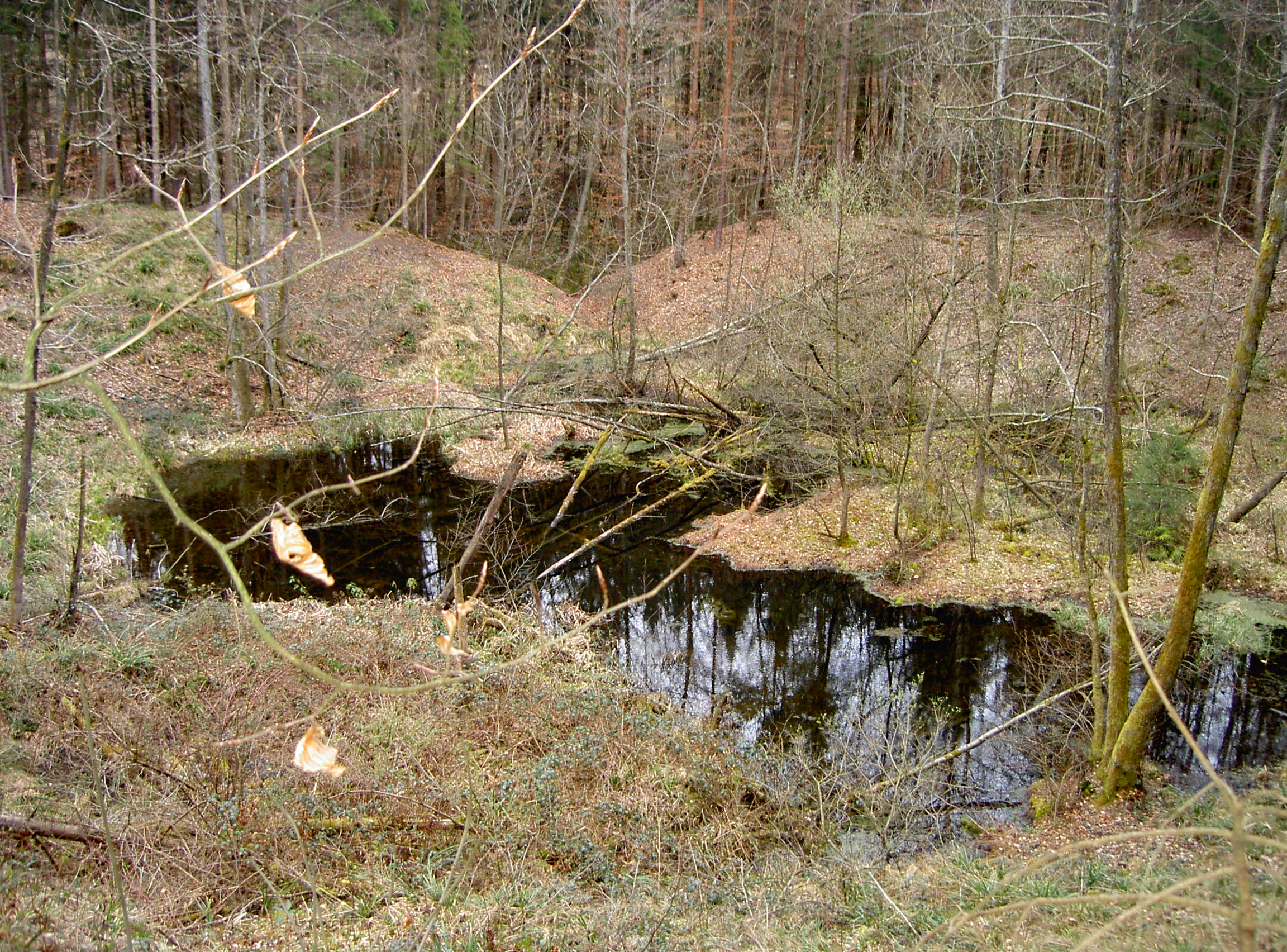
Moosloch funnel doline near Nordschwaben

The Dinkelberg is a partially forested hill range, up to 536.2 m above sea level (NHN), about 145 km^{2} in area, in the High Rhine region of Germany. It lies within the counties of Lörrach and Waldshut in the German state of Baden-Württemberg and the Swiss canton of Basel-Stadt. It is on the southwestern edge of the Southern Black Forest, from which it is geologically distinct.

== Geography ==
=== Location ===
The Dinkelberg lies mainly in the county of Lörrach, but its eastern part in the area of the Wehra valley belongs to the county of Waldshut (both in Germany) and a smaller element in the west is part of the canton of Basel-Stadt in Switzerland. It is bounded in the south by the valley of the High Rhine, in the north and west by the Wiese valley and in the esat by the Wehra valley. It lies between the larger settlements of Schopfheim to the north, Wehr to the east, Rheinfelden to the south and Lörrach and the Homburg Forest to the west. Its highest hill is the Hohe Flum (536.2 m), on which is an open observation tower and an eponymous hotel-restaurant.

=== Hills ===
Amongst the hills and foothills of the Dinkelberg are the following, sorted by height in metres (m) above sea level, based on the NHN reference system in Germany and the Meter über Meer (m ü. M.) in Switzerland:

- Hohe Flum (536.2 m; GE), south-southwest of Wiechs; with its observation tower
- Hirzenleck (523.4 m; GE), 1 km north of Herten; with the Eigenturm observation tower
- St. Chrischona (522 m; SW), in Bettingen-Chrischona; with the St. Chrischona TV tower
- Mauerhaldebuck (493.3 m; GE), southeast of Maulburg
- Mezelhöhe (Metzelhöhe; 487.1 m; GE), 2 km east-northeast of Salzert
- Eichberg (477.7 m; GE), northwest of Degerfelden
- Schachbühl (465.9 m; GE), 1.4 km north of Dossenbach
- Schindelberg (419.0 m; GE), east of Brombach

=== Waterbodies ===
Amongst the rivers and streams of the Dinkelberg are the Löhrgraben, which flows into the Wiese near Brombach, the Bachtelengraben, which empties into the Rhine near Schwörstadt-Unterdorf, the Dürrenbach, which discharges into the Rhine at Rheinfelden and the Hagenbacher Bach and the Waidbach, the headstreams of the Großbach (also called the Warmbach), which also flows into the Rhine, at Rheinfelden-Warmbach.

Amongst its lakes belongs the Eichener See near Schopfheim-Eichen.

=== Natural monuments ===
- Eichener See near Schopfheim-Eichen
- Erdmanns Cave (Erdmannshöhle) or Hasler Cave (Hasler Höhle) on the edge of Hasel
- Teufelsloch, a funnel doline near Rheinfelden-Nordschwaben
- Teufelsloch, funnel doline near Rheinfelden-Karsau
- Tschamber Cave (Tschamberhöhle) in Rheinfelden-Karsau, village of Riedmatt

=== Settlements ===
Towns and villages in and around the Dinkelberg region are (clockwise from the north):

- Maulburg
- Schopfheim
- Wehr
- Schwörstadt
- Minseln
- Eichsel
- Adelhausen
- Rheinfelden
- Inzlingen
- Grenzach-Wyhlen
- Lörrach
- Steinen

== Literature ==
- Friedrich Disch: Studien zur Kulturgeographie des Dinkelberges. Bundesanstalt für Landeskunde, Bad Godesberg, 1971.
- Hermann Wider: Der Dinkelberg. In: Geschichtsverein Markgräflerland (Hrsg.): Das Markgräflerland. Beiträge zu seiner Geschichte und Kultur. Schopfheim, 2010, 1, pp. 4–46.
