= Eichener See =

Lake in Lörrach, Baden-Württemberg, Germany

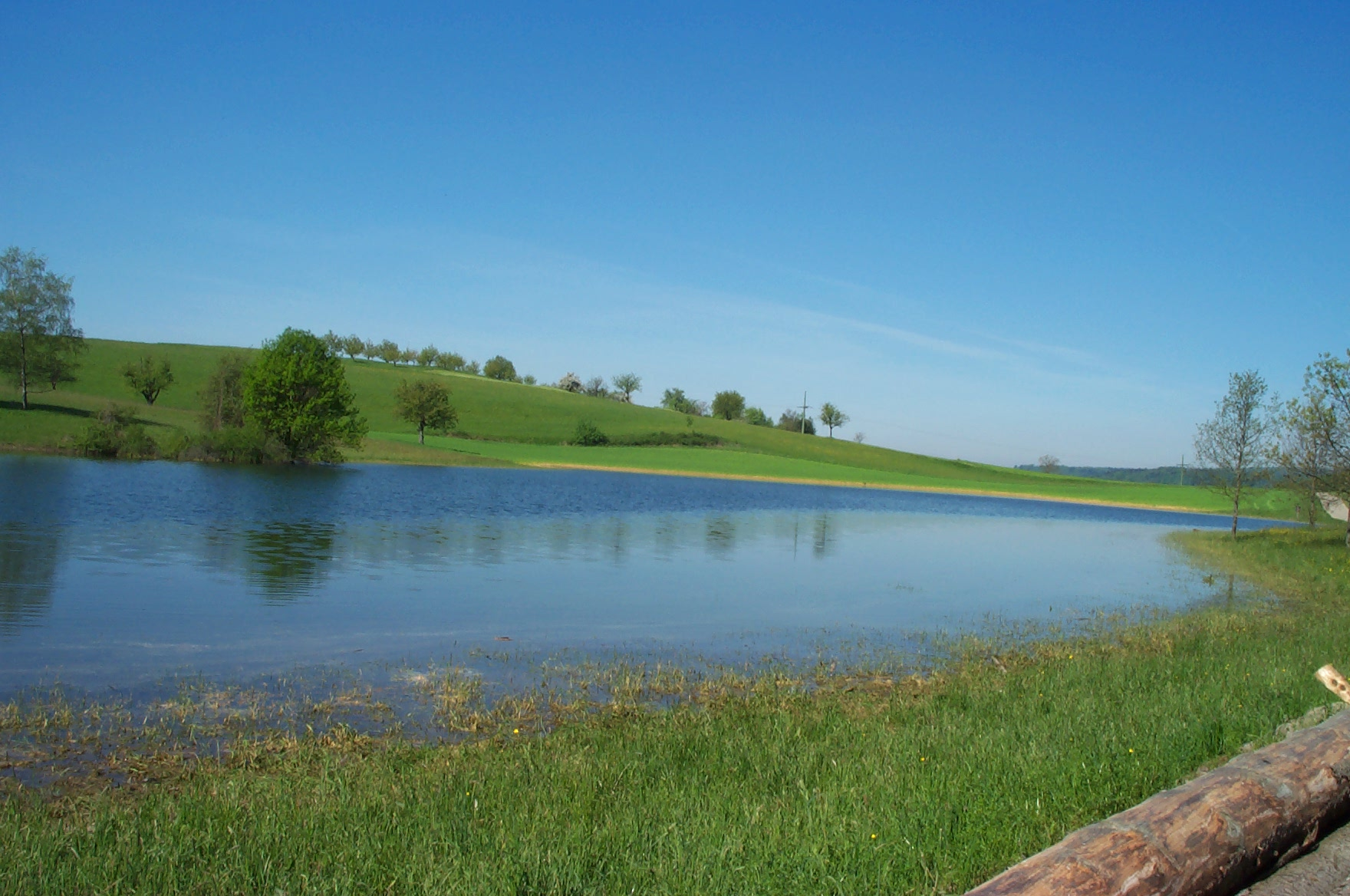
- The Eichener See filled with water (Jun 1999)

- Location within Germany
- Location: Lörrach, Baden-Württemberg (Germany)
- Coordinates: 47°38′41″N 7°51′44″E

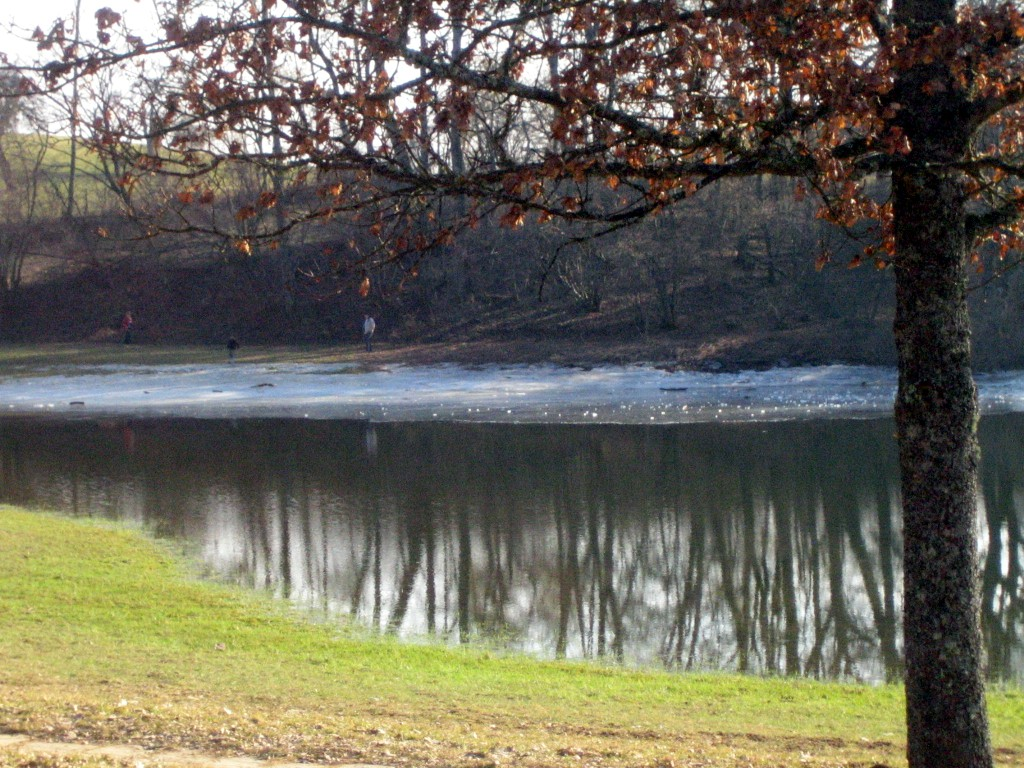
The Eichener See partly frozen over (Feb 2011)

The Eichener See ("Lake Eichen"), known in the Alemannic dialect as the Eiemer See, near Eichen in the Baden-Württemberg county of Lörrach is a periodic (astatic) karst lake in the Southern Black Forest in Germany.

The lake, which only contains water when there is a high water table, lies in a hollow, a muschelkalk-karst basin. It has no surface inflow, its outflows are partly subterranean and partly through evaporation.

== Location ==
The Eichener See lies in the Southern Black Forest Nature Park on the northeastern perimeter of the Dinkelberg ridge between the nearby village of Eichen to the west, which is part of the municipality of Schopfheim, the municipality of Hasel to the east-northeast and the town of Wehr to the southeast. It is located 2.5 km west of Erdmanns Cave (Hasler Höhle) in a shallow valley around 350 metres south of the Bundesstraße 518.

== Geology and hydrology ==
Geologically it is a doline which is periodically filled with water, particularly after snowmelt or after long periods of rain when the groundwater level reaches the surface. In dry periods, the depth of the water table may be up to 40 metres; the deepest point of the groundwater-storing basin lies about 48 metres below the earth's surface. The background to the large variations in water level are the caverns of the Dinkelberg (which consists mainly of muschelkalk) which can fill very quickly with water, but only empty slowly.

== Biology ==
The bed of the lake is colonised by rich herbaceous community of meadow flora. These may not be grazed or fertilised during dry periods. In the lake lives Tanymastix lacunae of the order of fairy shrimps (Anostraca). The drying out of the lake is essential for its life cycle. This is the only confirmed place in Germany where it is found; there are only seven other sites for the species in the whole of Europe.

== History ==
The lake is first recorded in 1771, when five people were drowned in a capsized boat. People also lost their lives in the lake in 1876 and 1910.

The first scientific description of the lake is probably the article Von einem merkwürdigen See in der oberen Markgrafschaft Baden ("About a notable lake in the upper Margraviate of Baden") by Heinrich Sander, which appeared in 1782 in the magazine, Der Naturforscher. The lake has been protected since 1939 and, since 1983, has been designated a natural monument with an area of 3.75 hectares. In addition it is a Special Area of Conservation at European level.

== Extent over time ==
In years when there is an especially heavy precipitation the (visible above ground) water level can rise to three meters and, within one to five weeks, the lake can reach a size of 250 metres long and 135 metres wide (c. 2.5 ha). It can take from 8 to 160 days for the water to disappear again.

Appearance (selection)

- Mid-January 2011
- Mid-January 2012
- End June 2016

== Literature ==
- Heinrich Sander: Von einem merkwürdigen See in der obern Markgrafschaft Baden; In: Heinrich Sanders Kleine Schriften (published by Georg Friedrich Götz), Vol. 1, Dessau and Leipzig, 1784, pp. 324–328, at books.google.de
- Johann Jakob Schneider: Der Eichener See; In: Das Badische Oberland, Lörrach, 1841, pp. 130–132
