= Christoph Friedrich Schlienz =

German missionary

- Born: Kirchheim unter Teck
- Died: St. Chrischona, near Basel
- Occupation: Missionary

Christoph Friedrich Schlienz (26 October 1803 - 26 April 1868) was a German missionary.

In his youth, Schlienze learned the trade of coopering from his father. During his training he converted to Christianity, and upon completing his apprenticeship he move to Basel, where he attended the missionary institute at St. Chrischona founded by de:Christian Friedrich Spittler. He then went to English to work for the missionary society. He studied Oriental languages at the mission house in the Islington district in London. His first assignment took him to Malta, where, in 1836, he translated the Bible into Arabic. From 1847 onwards, he worked in the Inner Mission in St. Chrischona, Basel, where he was a teacher.

Schlienz was an honorary member of the Royal Asiatic Society of Great Britain and Ireland.
