= Erdmann =

Erdmann is a first name and surname, and may refer to:

== Surname ==
- Carl Erdmann (1898–1945), German historian
- Eduard Erdmann (1896–1958), Baltic German pianist and composer
- Hans Otto Erdmann (1896–1944), member of the German resistance
- Hugo Erdmann (1862–1910), German chemist
- Johann Eduard Erdmann (1805–1892), German philosopher
- Karin Erdmann (born 1948), German mathematician
- Karl Gottfried Erdmann (1774–1835), German physician and botanist
- Mojca Erdmann (born 1975), German opera soprano
- Nikolai Erdman (1900–1970), Russian dramatist
- Otto Linné Erdmann (1804–1869), German chemist
- Rhoda Erdmann (1870–1935), German cell biologist
- Susi Erdmann (born 1968), German luger and bobsledder
- Ralph Erdmann, American pathologist
- Wilfried Erdmann (1940–2023), German sailor
- Wolfgang Erdmann (1898–1946), German general of paratroopers

== Given name ==
- Erdmann Copernicus (died 1573), German scholar, not related to the astronomer
- Erdmann August, Hereditary Prince of Brandenburg-Bayreuth (1615–1651)
- Erdmann Neumeister (1671–1756), German Lutheran pastor and hymnologist
- Erdmann II, Count of Promnitz (1683–1745)

== See also ==
- Erdman
