= Deaths of Tate Rowland and Terrie Trosper =

1988 and 1991 deaths in the United States

- Date: July 26, 1988 – May 30, 1991
- Location: Childress, Texas, U.S.
- Deaths: Janson Tate Rowland; Terrie Shawn Trosper

The deaths of Janson Tate Rowland (November 7, 1970 – July 26, 1988) and Terrie Shawn Trosper (February 27, 1964 – May 30, 1991), two siblings in Childress, Texas, occurred in 1988 and 1991, respectively. Though ruled a suicide and an accident, they were two of several cases attributed to the Satanic panic of the United States in the late 1980s.

== Tate Rowland ==
On the evening of July 26, 1988, the body of 17-year-old Tate Rowland was discovered hanging from a horse apple tree on a dirt road outside of Childress, Texas by his friend, Chad Johnston. At 6 p.m., Johnston came to Rowland's house, where he told Rowland's father and stepmother, Brenda, that he had witnessed Tate hang himself. The three rushed to the tree where Chad had witnessed the suicide, and Rowland's father, Jimmie, cut him down from the tree. According to Johnston, he and Rowland had been drinking beers outside their truck near the tree; he claimed that he had walked to the other side of the truck to throw a beer can away, and when he returned, he witnessed Rowland hang himself with the rope.

During a second interview with Johnston on July 28, he claimed that he witnessed Rowland attempt to hang himself twice; the first time, the rope broke, and the two returned to Rowland's home to retrieve another rope. Upon returning to the tree, Johnston claimed Rowland hanged himself by standing on the hood of the car and jumping off.

Rowland's death was officially ruled a suicide, attributed to personal troubles regarding the breakup between him and his girlfriend the year prior. On the day of his death, friends and relatives said he had not shown any signs of anger or depression. He had made plans to fill in as a coach at a friend's softball game that evening.

== Terrie Trosper ==
Three years after the suicide of her younger brother, Terrie Trosper, age 27, was found deceased in her bed on the morning of May 31, 1991. The first autopsy of Trosper by pathologist Dr. Ralph Erdmann showed that Trosper had died as a result of choking on her own vomit.

According to friend Lisa Barber, Trosper had never believed her younger brother had committed suicide. According to her autopsy, high levels of the psychiatric drug Elavil were found in Trosper's blood.

== Rumors of Satanism ==
Rumors surrounding the possibility of a Satanic cult being involved in the deaths began at Tate Rowland's funeral. According to the family, an unknown woman entered the chapel during Rowland's funeral, leaving before its conclusion; additionally, a male in attendance was reportedly chanting the word "suicide" during the funeral. According to the district attorney, there were also eyewitness reports of strangers attempting to pick up children from the local schools in the fall of 1988, and multiple phone calls were received each day by the police department claiming Rowland had been murdered due to his affiliations with a Satanic cult.

In November 1988, fifteen-year-old Ray Wilks, a peer of Rowland's, was arrested for drunkenly crashing a car into a utility pole. At his booking, Wilks claimed to have been a member of the rumored Satanic cult, and also claimed to have witnessed Rowland's death. His father thought Wilks could not have witnessed Rowland's death, as he was in a juvenile detention center the night of the hanging.

After Trosper's death, the rumors were reignited after Darwin Wilks, the older brother of Ray Wilks, attempted suicide by an Elavil overdose—the same drug found in Trosper's blood. On July 27, 1991, Rowland's body was exhumed due to the circulating allegations. Though Rowland's body was too decomposed to make conclusive statements about the hanging as a suicide, there were levels of Elavil found in his remains, and the coroner claimed to have been 70% sure that the death was a homicide. Trosper's body was also exhumed in late October, and the second autopsy, performed in December, revealed contusions on her thigh as well as evidence that she had been smothered to death.

After the autopsy information was made public, rumors circulated that Tate Rowland's death had actually been a cult sacrifice attended by as many as twenty people. Other reports of robed cult members and animal sacrifices occurred in the town in the ensuing year. The speculation surrounding the deaths of Rowland and Trosper led the Texas Department of Public Safety to distribute pamphlets to local police departments listing thirty ways to determine whether or not a death had been the result of occult ritual abuse.

== See also ==
- List of unsolved deaths

== Bibliography ==
- Hollandsworth, Skip (July 1992). "Possessed by the Devil". Texas Monthly. 20 (7): 90–94, 120–27.
