= Dora Rappard =

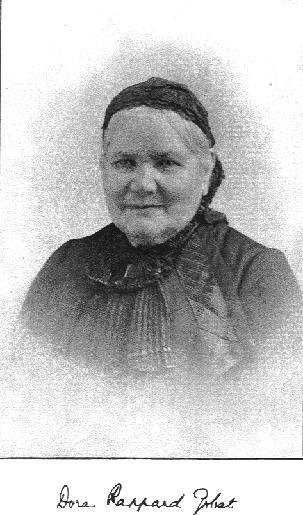
- Born: Sophie Rosine Dorothea Gobat; 1 September 1842; St Julian's, Malta.
- Died: 10 October 1923 (aged 81); Bettingen, Basel-Stadt, Switzerland
- Occupations: Missionary and hymn writer

Dora Rappard (1 September 1842 – 10 October 1923) was a Swiss missionary and hymn writer. For many years she taught and gave spiritual guidance at the St. Chrischona Pilgrim Mission, a training school for evangelical missionaries near Basel, Switzerland. Many of her hymns are included in modern hymnals.

== Life ==
Sophie Rosine Dorothea (Dora) Gobat was born on 1 September 1842 in St Julian's, Malta. Her parents were Samuel Gobat (1799–1879) and Marie Christine Regine Zeller (1813–1879). Her maternal grandfather was Christian Heinrich Zeller (1779–1860). Her father, who was Swiss, had been made Anglican Bishop in Jerusalem by King Frederick William IV of Prussia and Queen Victoria of the United Kingdom. She grew up in Jerusalem. In 1862 she was head of a girls' school in Jerusalem.

Dora married Karl Heinrich Rappard (1837–1909) in 1867 and moved with him to Alexandria and Cairo. From 1868 onward they lived in St. Chrischona near Basel. They had two children, Simon and Theodora Marie. She helped her husband teach at the Bible School in St. Chrischona. The St. Chrischona Pilgrim Mission was an evangelical training school for home and foreign missions. From 1868 she was very active working with her husband in St. Chrischona. From 1871 she was administrative director, pastor, evangelist and builder. Dora Rappard was a formative figure within the pietist community movement. She came to be called "the mother of St. Chrischona" due to her spiritual advice, leadership and writings.

Dora Rappard died on 10 October 1923 in St. Chrischona, in the municipality of Bettingen, Basel-Stadt, Switzerland.

== Publications ==
Dora Rappard translated English revivalist hymns into German. She became well known for the many songs she composed or wrote herself. The Mennonite Hymnal (1972) has two of her songs: Here is my heart, My God, I give it to you and There still is room, His house is not yet full. She was also a very gifted poet, whose work had great influence.

Her publications include:

- Glaubenslieder, 1875
- Geistlichen Friedenslieder, 1875
- Geistlichen Friedenslieder, 1875
- Gemeinschafts-Lieder (Community songs) (multiple editions ed.), 1875
- Im Heiligtum - Lieder und Gedichte zu Jesu Preis, 1888
- Lichte Spuren (Light traces) (autobiography), 1914
- Chrischonalieder 27 Lieder für Frauenstimmen, 1922
- Frohes Alter (Happy age), 1923

== Sources ==
- Bloesch, Donald G. (2001-07-11), Is the Bible Sexist?, Wipf and Stock Publishers, ISBN 978-1-57910-691-1
- Gerlach, Horst (2013), My Kingdom Is Not of This World: 300 Years of the Amish, 1683-1983, Masthof Press & Bookstore, ISBN 978-1-60126-387-2
- Killy, Walther (2005), "Rappard, Dora", Plett - Schmidseder, Walter de Gruyter, ISBN 978-3-11-096630-5
- Raupp, Werner (27 July 2010), "Rappard, Dora", Historisches Lexikon der Schweiz (in German)
- "Sophie Rosine Dorothea (Dora) Rappard", Geni
