= Dürrenbach =

River in Germany

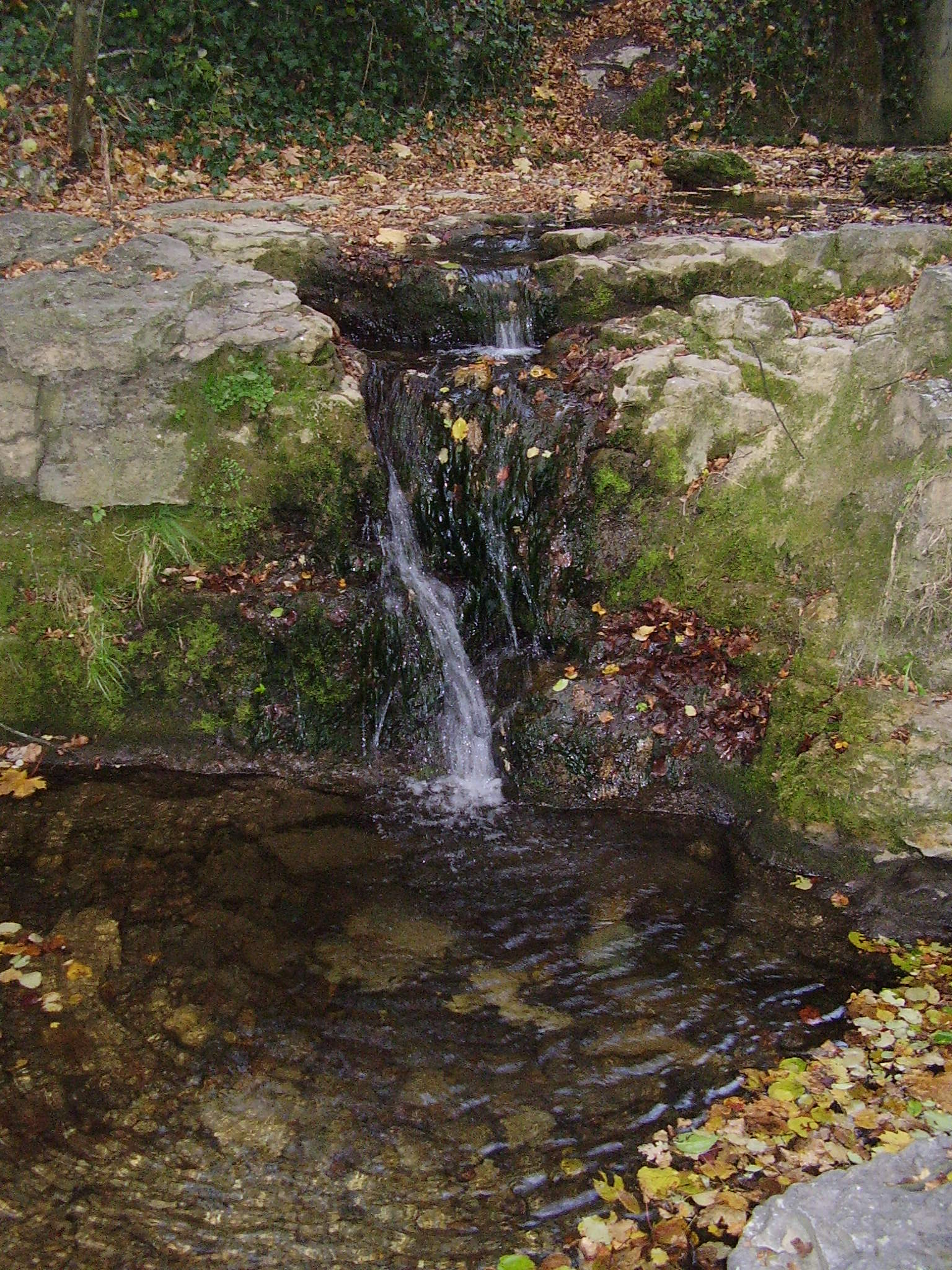

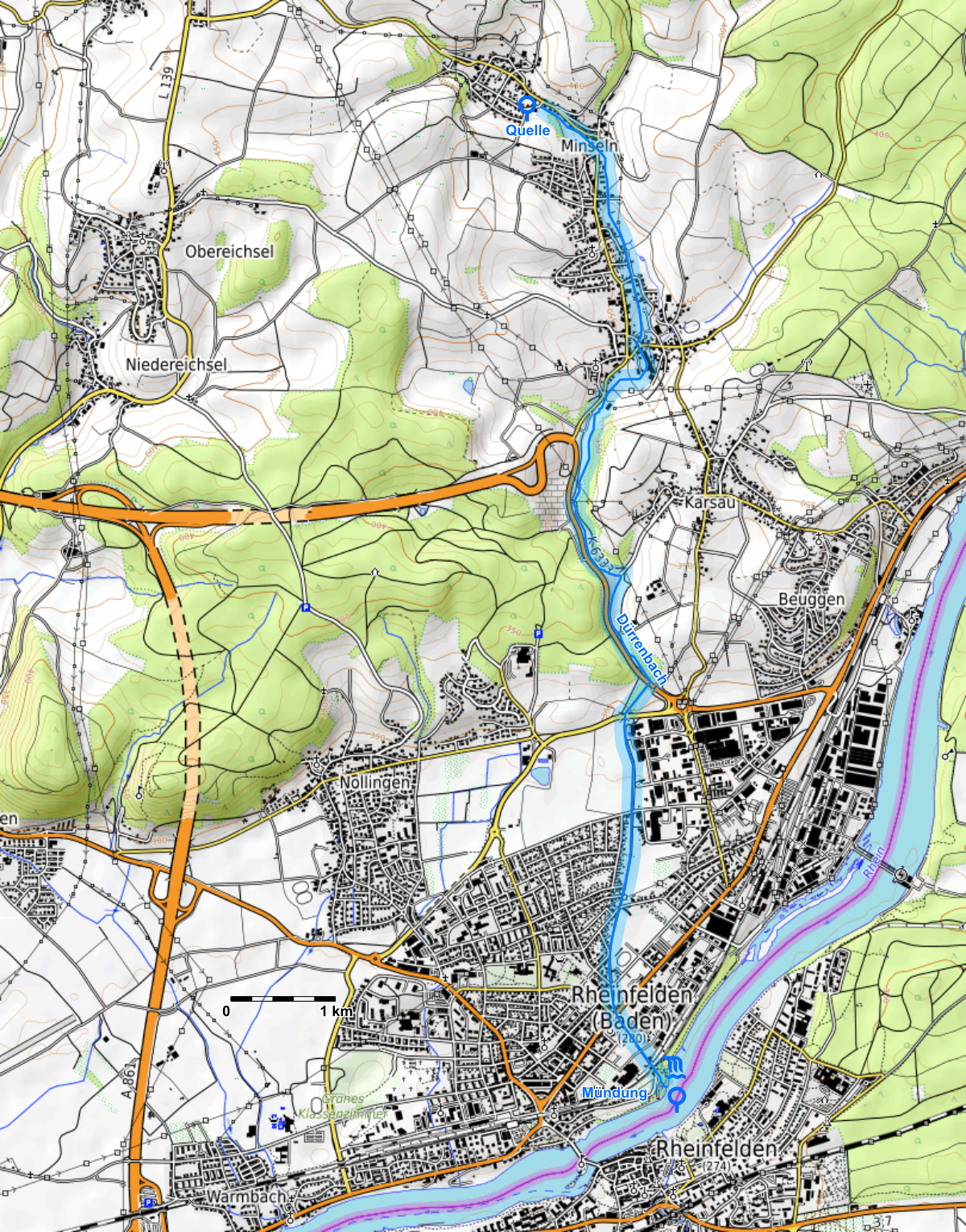

Location
- Country: Germany
- State: Baden-Württemberg

Physical characteristics
- Mouth
  - location: Rhine
  - coordinates: 47°33′31″N 7°47′44″E

Basin features
- Progression: Rhine→ North Sea

Dürrenbach is a river of Baden-Württemberg, Germany. It flows into the Rhine in Rheinfelden (Baden), and begins near Oberminseln.

== See also ==
- List of rivers of Baden-Württemberg
