= Rheinfelden (Baden) =

- Town
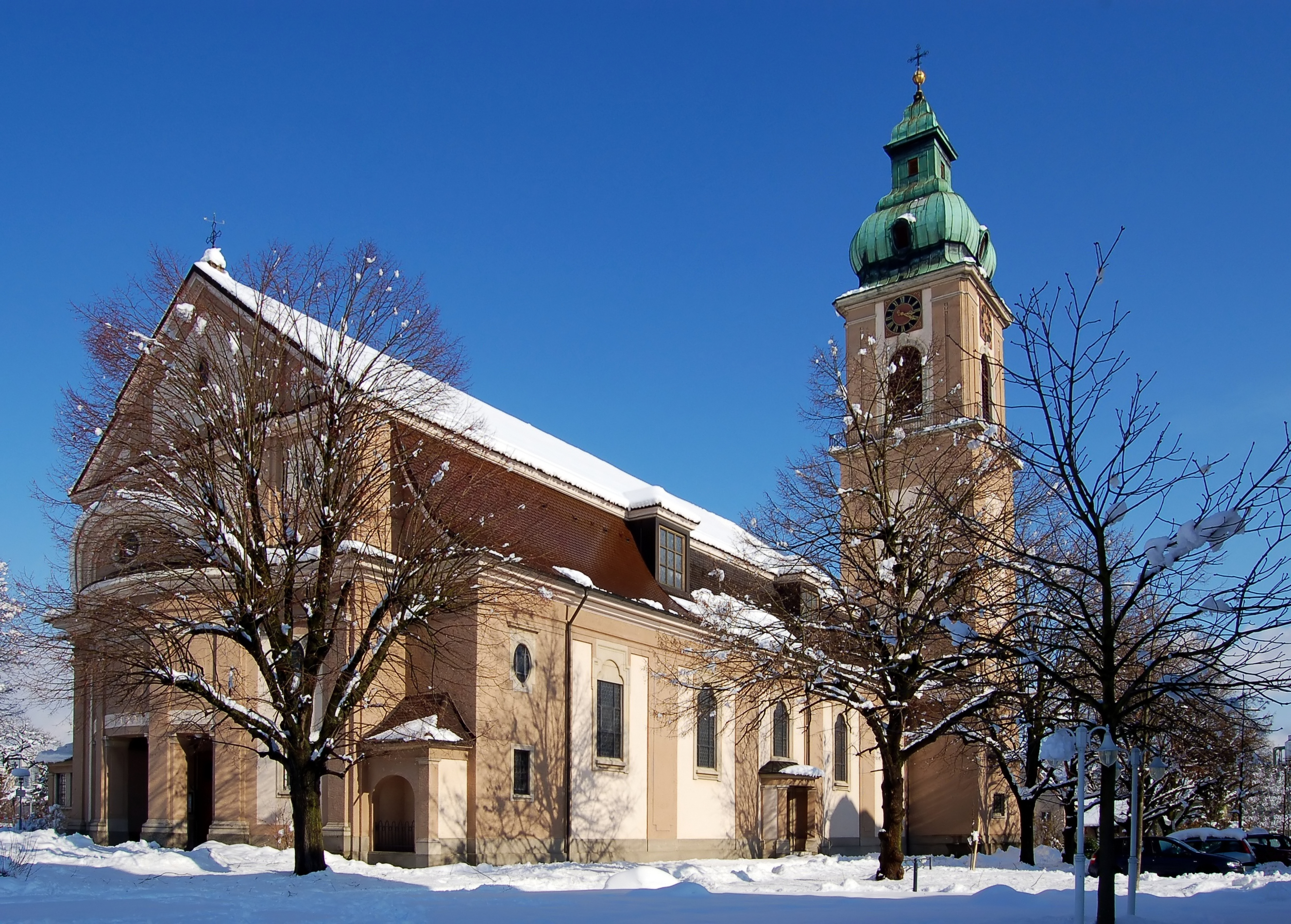
- Saint Joseph Church

- Coat of arms

- Location of Rheinfelden within Lörrach district
- Interactive map of Rheinfelden
- Location within Germany Location within Baden-Württemberg
- Coordinates: 47°33′40″N 7°47′30″E
- Country: Germany
- State: Baden-Württemberg
- Admin. region: Freiburg
- District: Lörrach
- Subdivisions: 8

Government
  - Mayor (2020–28): Klaus Eberhardt (SPD)

Area
  - Total: 62.84 km^{2} (24.26 sq mi)
- Elevation: 280 m (920 ft)

Population (2025-12-31)
  - Total: 34,788
  - Density: 553.6/km^{2} (1,434/sq mi)
- Time zone: UTC+01:00 (CET)
  - Summer (DST): UTC+02:00 (CEST)
- Postal codes: 79618
- Dialling codes: 07623
- Vehicle registration: LÖ
- Website: www.rheinfelden.de

Rheinfelden (German pronunciation: [ˈʁaɪnˌfɛldn̩]; Alemannic German: Badisch-Rhyfälde, pronounced [ˈb̥ad̥ɪʃ ʁifæld̥ə]) is a town in the district of Lörrach in Baden-Württemberg, Germany. It is situated on the right bank of the Rhine, across from Rheinfelden, Switzerland, and 15 km east of Basel. The population is 32,919 as of 2020, making it the second most populated town of the district after Lörrach.

== Geography ==
Rheinfelden is located on the Swiss-German border, between the High Rhine to the south and the Dinkelberg hills to the north in the district of Lörrach. It borders the Swiss town of the same name across the Rhine river, and the towns of Grenzach-Wyhlen, Inzlingen, Steinen, Maulburg, Schopfheim, and Schwörstadt in Germany.

=== Communities ===
Rheinfelden consists of a relatively young town core (founded in the late 19th century), two formerly independent villages (Nollingen and Warmbach), and seven villages which were incorporated into the town between 1972 and 1975. These are:

- Degerfelden (alem. Degerfälde).
- Minseln (alem. Meisele).
- Herten (alem. Herte).
- Nordschwaben (alem. Nordschwoobe).
- Adelhausen (alem. Adelhuuse).
- Eichsel (alem. Eiggsle)
- Karsau (alem. Charsau) and its community of Beuggen (alem. Büügge).

Apart from the town core, the villages forming Rheinfelden date from the early Middle Ages. Partly because of this, a teasing animosity exists between the villages with their longer history and traditions, and the industrial town core with its diverse population of recent origin.

== Transport ==
=== Air ===
The town is served by EuroAirport Basel-Mulhouse-Freiburg, located 30 km (19 mi) which is half an hour drive north west of Rheinfelden. Zurich Airport can also be reached, it is located 78 km (48 mi) which is an hour drive south east of Rheinfelden.

== Twin towns – sister cities ==
Rheinfelden (Baden) is twinned with:

- Fécamp, France
- Mouscron, Belgium
- Neumarkt, Italy
- Vale of Glamorgan, Wales

== Notable people ==
- Hans Blum (1841–1910), journalist and writer, lived in Rheinfelden from 1865.
- Jürgen Untermann (1928–2013), linguist, indoeuropeanist and epigraphist
- Anne-Sophie Mutter (born 1963), violinist
- Jochen Böhler (born 1969), historian, specializing in the military history of World War II
- Dietmar Dath (born 1970), author, journalist and translator
- Lars Halter (born 1973), German-American journalist

=== Sport ===
- Thomas Süss (born 1962), former footballer who played 286 games
- Monique Riesterer (born 1971), weightlifter
- Ruwen Faller (born 1980), 400 metre sprinter
- sisters Alisa Vetterlein (born 1988) & Laura Vetterlein (born 1992), footballers
- Philipp Hercher (born 1996), footballer who has played over 230 games
- Raoul Petretta (born 1997), Italian footballer, played over 190 games
