= Erdman =

Erdman is a surname. Notable people with the surname include:

- Andrew L. Erdman (born 1965), American author, journalist, and scholar
- Charles Erdman Petersdorff (1800–1886), legal writer
- Charles R. Erdman Sr. (1866–1960), American Presbyterian minister and theologist
- Charles R. Erdman Jr. (1897–1984), American politician
- Constantine Jacob Erdman (1846–1911), American politician from Pennsylvania
- David V. Erdman (1911–2001), American literary critic, editor, and academic
- Derek Erdman (born 1973), American artist from Washington
- Jacob Erdman (1801–1867), American politician from Pennsylvania
- Jean Erdman (1916–2020), dancer, choreographer, and theater director
- Jean Erdman, Baron Dieskau (1701–1767), German-born soldier remembered mostly as a French general and commander in America
- Marshall Erdman (1922–1995), Lithuanian-American builder
- Molly Erdman (born 1974), American actress and comedian
- Nikolai Erdman (1900–1970), Soviet dramatist and screenwriter
- Paul Erdman (1932–2007), American business and financial writer
- Philip Erdman (born 1977), American politician from Nebraska
- Richard Erdman (1925–2019), American actor and director
- Richard Erdman (artist) (born 1952), American artist
- Wayne Erdman (born 1952), Canadian judoka
- Woody Erdman (1926–1997), American sportscaster, television producer and businessman

== See also ==
- Erdman Act, United States federal law pertaining to railroad labor disputes
- Marshall Erdman Prefab Houses
