= Basel-Stadt =

Canton of Switzerland

Canton of Basel-Stadt Kanton Basel-Stadt (German) Canton of Basel-City
- Canton
- Flag Coat of arms Logo

- Basel-Stadt highlighted in Switzerland, with the special marker
- Interactive map of Canton of Basel-Stadt
- Coordinates: 47°34′N 7°36′E
- Country: Switzerland
- Capital: Basel
- Subdivisions: 3 municipalities

Government
  - President: Conradin Cramer
  - Executive: Executive Council (7)
  - Legislative: Grand Council (100)

Area
  - Total: 36.95 km^{2} (14.27 sq mi)

Population (July 2021)
  - Total: 201,156
  - Density: 5,444/km^{2} (14,100/sq mi)

GDP
  - Total: CHF 41.203 billion (2022)
  - Per capita: CHF 209,782 (2022)
- ISO 3166 code: CH-BS
- Highest point: 522.19 m (1,713 ft): St. Chrischona
- Lowest point: 244.75 m (803 ft): Rhine shore, national border at Kleinhüningen
- Joined: 1501
- Languages: German
- Website: www.bs.ch

Canton of Basel-Stadt or Basel-City (German: Kanton Basel-Stadt [ˌbaːzl̩ˈʃtat]; Romansh: Chantun Basilea-Citad; French: Canton de Bâle-Ville [bɑl.vil]; Italian: Canton Basilea Città) is one of the 26 cantons forming the Swiss Confederation. It is composed of three municipalities with Basel as the capital. It is traditionally considered a "half-canton", the other half being Basel-Landschaft, its rural counterpart.

Basel-Stadt is one of the northernmost and lowest cantons of Switzerland, and the smallest by area. The canton lies on both sides of the Rhine and is very densely populated. The largest municipality is Basel, followed by Riehen and Bettingen. The only canton sharing borders with Basel-Stadt is Basel-Landschaft to the south. To the north of Basel-Stadt are France and Germany, with the tripoint being in the middle of the Rhine.

Together with Basel-Landschaft, Basel-Stadt was part of the Canton of Basel, which joined the Old Swiss Confederacy in 1501. Political quarrels and armed conflict led to the partition of the canton in 1833.

Basel-Stadt is Switzerland's seventh-largest economic centre and has the highest GDP per capita in the country, ahead of the cantons of Zug and Geneva (in 2018). In terms of value, over 94% of Basel City's goods exports are in the chemical and pharmaceutical sectors. With production facilities located in the neighbouring Schweizerhalle, Basel accounts for 20% of Swiss exports.

== History ==
The canton of Basel-Stadt was created when the historic canton of Basel was divided in 1833, following political quarrels and armed conflict in the canton. Some of these were concerned with the rights of the population in the agricultural areas. They ultimately led to the separation of the canton of Basel-Landschaft from the city of Basel on 26 August 1833. Since then, there has been a movement for reunification. This movement gained momentum after 1900 when many parts of Basel-Landschaft became industrialized. The two half-cantons agreed in principle to reunite, but in 1969, and again in September 2014, the people of Basel-Landschaft voted against this proposal in favour of retaining their independence.

== Geography ==
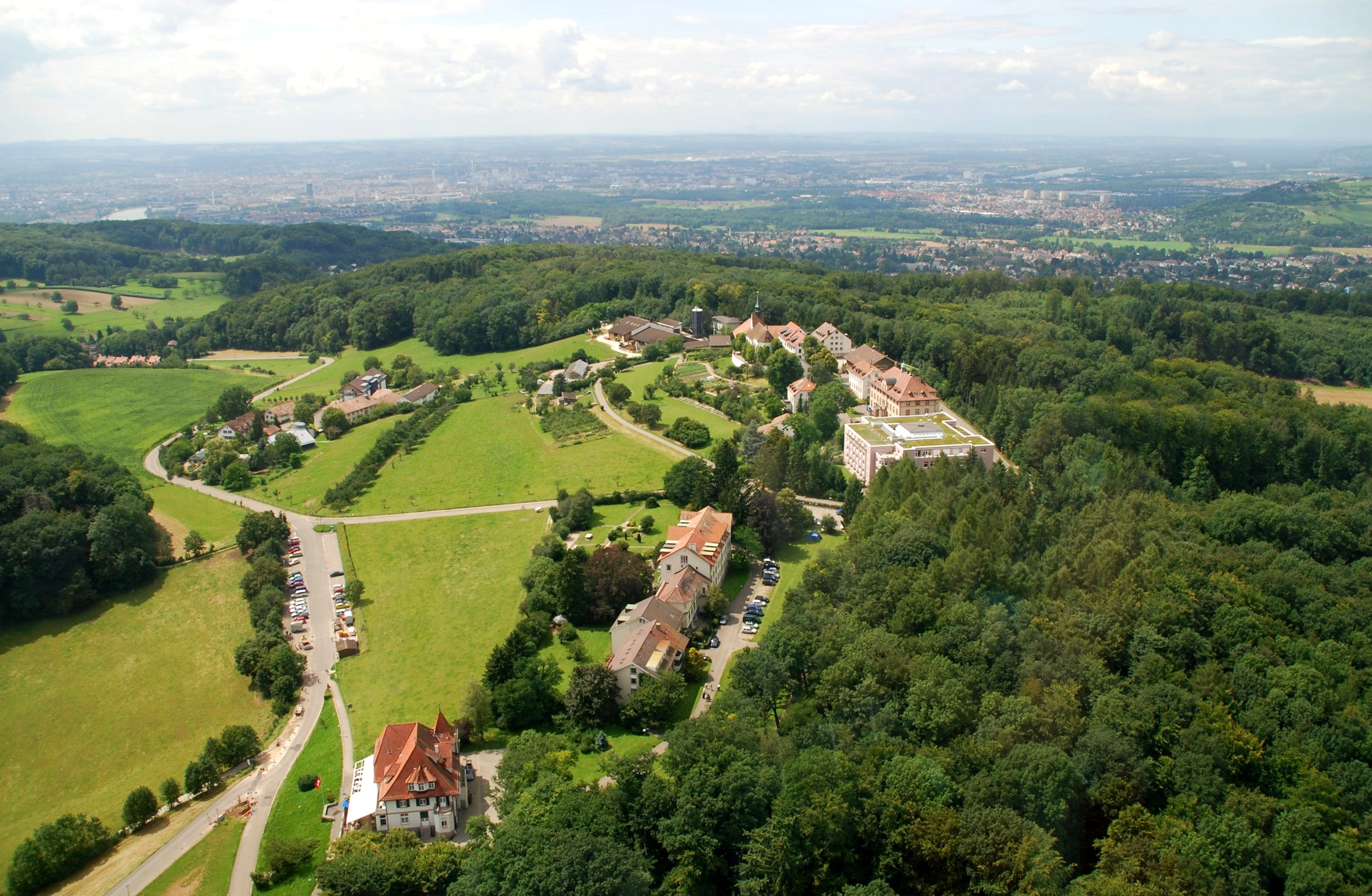
View of Basel-Stadt (left background) and St. Chrischona (foreground), the highest location in the canton, from the nearby TV tower

The canton of Basel-Stadt is located in the north of Switzerland. The city of Basel is found at the Rhine knee where the river Birsig flows into its left bank. At this bend, the river veers from a westerly to a northerly flow, marking the change from the High Rhine to the Upper Rhine. The other two municipalities, Riehen and Bettingen, are found in the valley of the Wiese, lying on the westernmost slopes of the Dinkelberg hill range.

The part of the city called Grossbasel, comprising most of Basel's old town, is situated on the Rhine's left bank and is bordered on the south by Basel-Landschaft, and on the north-west by the French region of Grand Est. The rest of the canton (Kleinbasel, Riehen, and Bettingen) is situated on the Rhine's right bank, projecting north-east towards the German state of Baden-Württemberg. The territories of Switzerland, France and Germany meet in the middle of the Rhine, about 150 metres north of the Dreiländereck monument.

Basel-Stadt is the smallest canton in Switzerland, with an area of just 37 km^{2} (14 sq mi). It is also the second flattest canton, with a height difference of only 277 metres between the Rhine and its highest hamlet, St. Chrischona.

The most urbanized area is the city of Basel, while Riehen and Bettingen combined possess more than 80% of the canton's forested area.

== Municipalities ==
There are three municipalities:

Municipality	Inhabitants (30 June 2021)	Area	
Municipality	Inhabitants (30 June 2021)	km^{2}	sq mi
Basel	178,120	23.85	9.21
Bettingen	1,248	2.23	0.86
Riehen	21,788	10.87	4.20

== Politics ==
The canton of Basel-Stadt shares its political structure and administration with the municipality of Basel.

Basel-Stadt is a half-canton. This means that the canton only sends one representative to the Council of States. The capital of the canton Basel-Stadt is the city of Basel. The present constitution of the canton dates from 1889. In 1966 Basel-Stadt became the first German-speaking canton to allow women to vote, five years before the right to vote was extended to all Swiss women in 1971.

The parliament of the canton is the Grand Council, which has 100 members, who are elected for four years at a time. There are eight different political parties represented in the parliament; the largest party is the Social Democratic Party, with 32 seats.

The executive of the canton (Regierungsrat) is made up of seven members.

The canton has a sister state status with Massachusetts.

=== Federal election results ===
Percentage of the total vote per party in the canton in the Federal Elections 1971–2015
Party	Ideology	1971	1975	1979	1983	1987	1991	1995	1999	2003	2007	2011	2015
FDP.The Liberals^{a}	Classical liberalism	11.5	11.4	14.1	13.5	11.2	15.8	12.2	12.1	9.9	11.3	12.3	9.8
CVP/PDC/PPD/PCD	Christian democracy	11.2	12.1	13.9	9.9	10.0	10.4	9.7	8.6	6.6	7.4	6.5	6.4
SP/PS	Social democracy	30.4	33.3	33.3	31.0	25.9	25.3	35.5	33.3	40.9	35.2	29.1	33.3
SVP/UDC	Swiss nationalism	* ^{b}	*	*	*	*	2.0	*	13.6	18.6	18.5	16.5	17.6
LPS/PLS	Swiss Liberal	13.0	11.6	11.2	8.3	12.3	13.3	14.9	10.7	8.5	9.2	6.8	11.5
Ring of Independents	Social liberalism	12.7	9.9	7.6	7.0	9.4	7.4	*	*	*	*	*	*
EVP/PEV	Christian democracy	*	4.0	*	4.8	4.5	3.3	4.1	3.8	2.9	3.6	2.5	2.3
GLP/PVL	Green liberalism	*	*	*	*	*	*	*	*	*	*	5.8	4.8
BDP/PBD	Conservatism	*	*	*	*	*	*	*	*	*	*	2.2	1.1
PdA/PST-POP/PC/PSL	Socialism	6.1	4.6	4.7	2.3	1.9	1.4	1.3	*	*	*	*	*
POCH	Progressivism	1.8	4.2	10.3	11.9	9.4	7.8	^{c}	*	*	*	*	*
GPS/PES	Green politics	*	*	*	*	1.1	4.4	5.6	8.7	9.2	12.1	13.4	11.2
FGA	Feminist	*	*	*	1.0	3.3	^{d}	6.0	^{e}	*	*	*	*
Solidarity	Anti-capitalism	*	*	*	*	*	*	0.7	*	*	*	*	*
SD/DS	National conservatism	8.0	8.2	3.9	5.3	4.5	3.2	6.9	3.8	1.1	0.7	*	*
Rep.	Republicanism	4.9	*	*	*	*	*	*	*	*	*	*	*
EDU/UDF	Christian right	*	*	*	*	*	0.9	*	*	0.7	0.5	0.5	0.5
Other		0.4	0.8	0.9	5.0	6.5	4.8	0.7	5.5	1.6	1.7	4.2	1.4
Voter participation %		46.5	43.8	39.4	45.7	43.6	45.0	46.8	47.4	49.6	52.4	50.3	50.4

^a FDP before 2009, FDP.The Liberals after 2009
^b "*" indicates that the party was not on the ballot in this canton.
^c Part of the FGA
^d Part of the POCH
^e Part of the GPS

== Demographics ==
=== Historical population ===
The historical population is given in the following table:

Historic Population Data
Year	Total Population	Swiss	Non-Swiss
1850	29,698	22,879	6,819
1900	112,227	69,446	42,781
1950	196,498	180,145	16,353
1990	199,411	152,601	46,810
2020	196,735		

The population of the canton (as of 31 July 2021) is 201,156. As of 2007, the population included 56,106 foreigners, or about 30.29% of the total population. The population (as of 2000) is nearly evenly split between Roman Catholics (25%) and Protestants (27%). About 10% of the population was classed as adhering to another religion, while 36% did not belong to an organized religion.

Nationalities (0.30% and above)	1990	2000	2010	2018
Switzerland	77.52%	72.44%	67.36%	63.58%
Germany	2.60%	3.27%	7.58%	8.22%
Italy	6.42%	5.44%	4.18%	4.32%
Turkey	3.27%	4.38%	3.56%	3.09%
Yugoslavia	2.79%	3.13%	—N/a	—N/a
Serbia; Montenegro; Kosovo	—N/a	—N/a	2.46%	2.14%
Spain	2.78%	2.16%	1.52%	1.92%
Portugal	0.42%	0.79%	1.35%	1.73%
North Macedonia	—N/a	1.12%	1.17%	1.11%
France	0.59%	0.54%	0.76%	1.10%
Great Britain	0.35%	0.48%	0.96%	1.10%
India	0.12%	0.17%	0.65%	0.83%
United States	0.25%	0.31%	0.63%	0.80%
Austria	0.45%	0.45%	0.58%	0.61%
Poland	0.09%	0.08%	0.23%	0.47%
Croatia	—N/a	0.81%	0.54%	0.44%
Hungary	0.15%	0.10%	0.19%	0.42%
Sri Lanka	0.30%	0.63%	0.49%	0.41%
Eritrea	—N/a	0.00%	0.10%	0.40%
Netherlands	0.18%	0.21%	0.32%	0.40%
Romania	0.05%	0.04%	0.12%	0.34%
Bosnia and Herzegovina	—N/a	0.68%	0.41%	0.32%
Brazil	0.03%	0.12%	0.28%	0.30%

== Economy ==
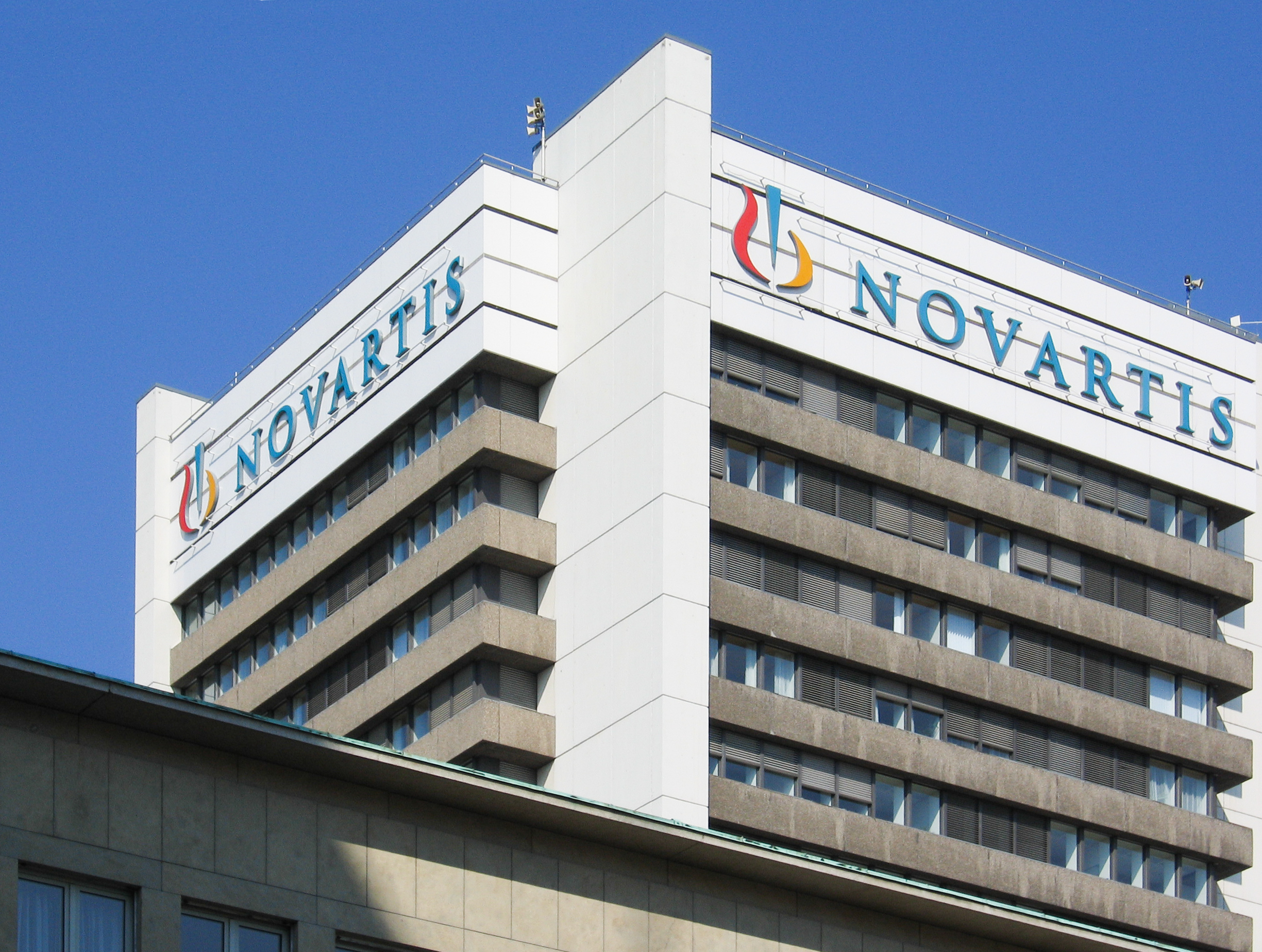
Novartis headquarters in Basel

The economic area of Basel is considered to be the second largest economic centre in Switzerland, after Zurich. The chemical industry and the pharmaceutical industry are of greatest significance in the canton. There are a number of multinationals in the city of Basel, attracting workers from both cantons of Basel and the areas across the border in France and Germany. Banking and finance are important as is the service sector in general. Small and middle-sized businesses employ a significant number of people, both in the city as the two municipalities. The canton is also known for its banking sector, and for being the worldwide seat of the Bank for International Settlements.

Economically, the neighbouring lands in Germany and France are not separated from the area of the canton of Basel-Stadt. Good transport links across the border, as well as supportive local governments, facilitate this link.

The fact that three nation-states come together in one spot near Basel (Dreiländereck) helps attract tourists. The site is clearly identified and a popular destination for primary school classes. The carnival attracts a large number of people from across Switzerland and the neighbouring countries.

In 2014, there were 104 workers in Basel-Stadt who worked in the primary sector (the total for all of Switzerland is 3.3%). In the same year the secondary sector employed 36,441 or about 19.0% of the total workforce. Of those in the secondary sector, nearly half of the workers were involved in the production of pharmaceutical products. The tertiary sector employed 154,896 or about 80.9% of the total, which is slightly higher than 74.9% nationwide. Of those in the tertiary sector, health care, education and retail sales made up about a quarter. Some of the other major tertiary fields included job placement (5.1%), management and business consulting (4.1%), public administration (3.9%), architectural and engineering offices (3.7%) and financial services (3.5%).

== Transport ==
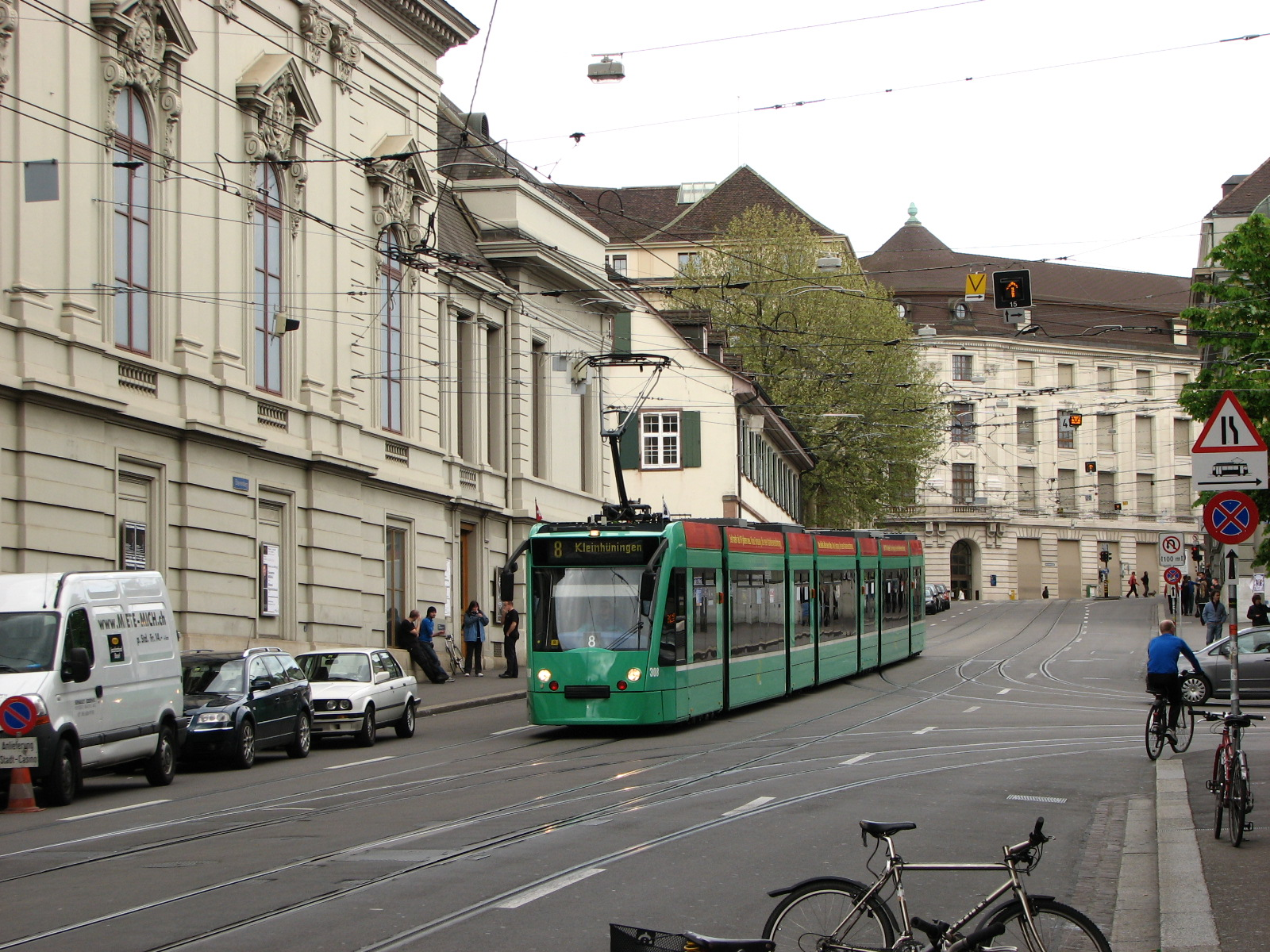
Tram service for commuting within the Basel city area

There is an international airport at Basel-Mulhouse, actually located 4 km (2.5 mi) inside French territory but with customs-free access from the city. The canton is well connected by both trains and motorways to the rest of Switzerland and the neighbouring areas in France and Germany.

Basel is a major railway station of Switzerland, connected to Paris and Berlin with direct fast trains.

There is a port at Basel for ships on the Rhine. This port is of great significance to landlocked Switzerland, as it offers the country's only direct connection to the sea. The port benefits from good connections to both rail and road.

== Culture ==
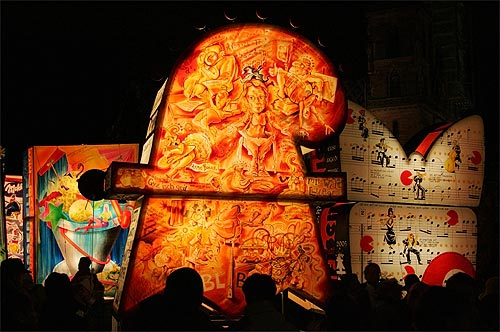
Basler Fasnacht early-morning parade with Lanterns

The Carnival of Basel (Basler Fasnacht) is a major cultural event in the year. The carnival is one of the biggest in Switzerland and attracts large crowds, despite the fact that many of its central traditions are played out in the early morning starting at 4am (Morgestraich) and followed by a continuous run of festivities for 72 hours.

The Autumn Fair in Basel (Basler Herbstmesse) is the biggest in Switzerland.

The canton of Basel is renowned for two of its biscuits. The Basler Läckerli is a hard biscuit made of honey, almonds, candied peel and Kirsch, and is enjoyed as a speciality all year round. The Basler Brunsli is made of almonds and generally enjoyed at Christmas all around Switzerland.

The Basel Messe convention center is the location of several international events. The largest are Art Basel, an art show for modern and contemporary works, and BaselWorld, a major watch and jewellery show.

Famous cultural ambassadors of Basel are the Top Secret Drum Corps and the Basel Boys Choir.

== See also ==
- List of castles and fortresses in Switzerland
- Swiss Plateau
- Pharmaceutical industry
