= Lars Halter =

German-American journalist (born 1973)

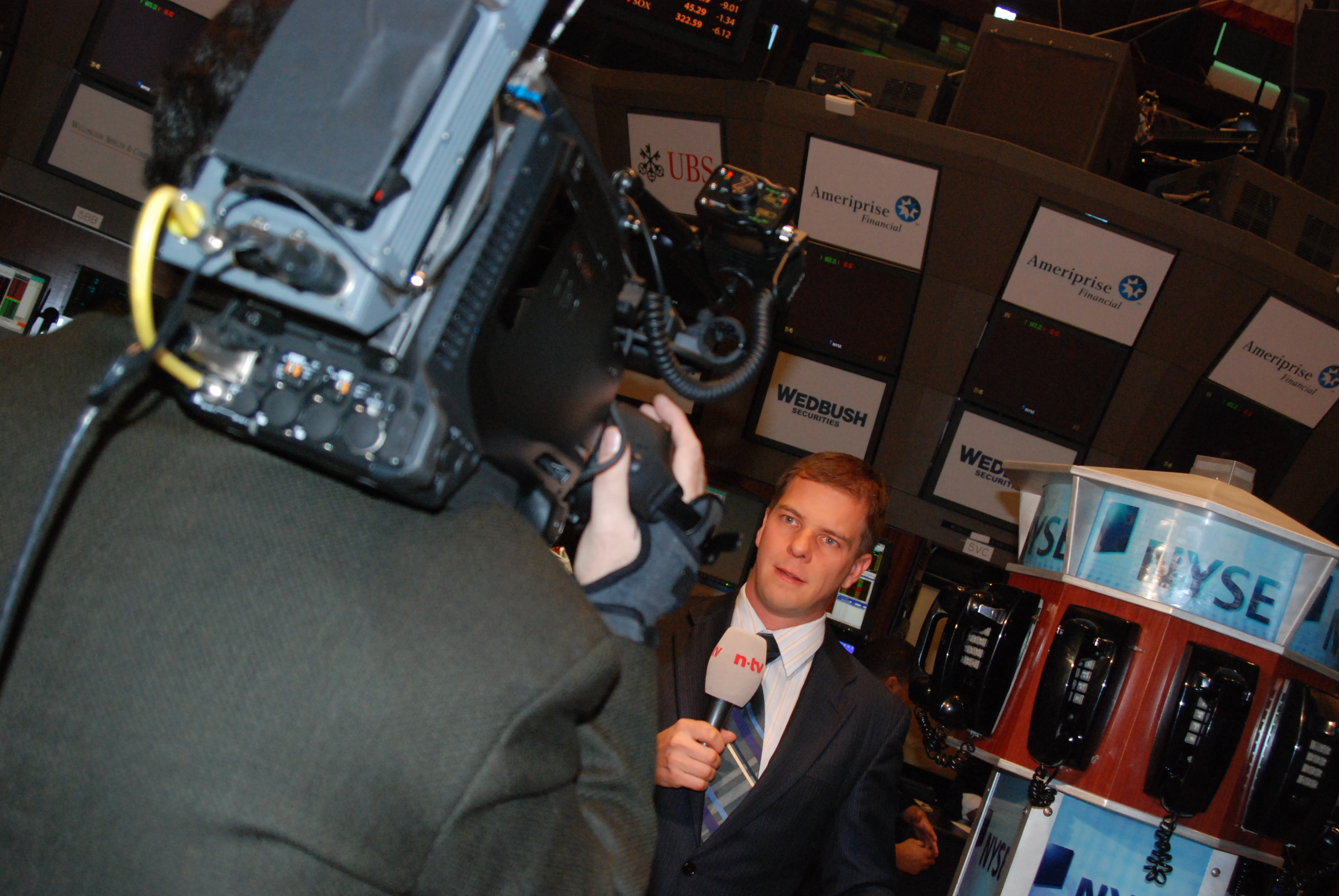

Reporter

Personal details
- Born: November 29, 1973 (age 51); Rheinfelden, Baden-Wuerttemberg, West Germany
- Spouse: Christine Schultz-Halter
- Profession: Journalist

Lars Halter (born November 29, 1973, in Rheinfelden, West Germany) is a German journalist, who has also worked in the U.S. As a journalist he covered Wall Street for German TV stations n-tv and Deutsche Welle in Berlin, where he is currently a reporter and producer.

== Early life ==
Lars Halter attended the Gymnasium in Schopfheim and later Lörrach. He focused early on economical studies, while working as a journalist for local newspapers mostly covering political and cultural events. He continued to work as a journalist and photographer, when he was drafted into the German Bundeswehr. Halter served in the emergency headquarters, when his battalion was helping to fight the great flood of 1997 at the Oder River.

== Journalism ==
Halter moved to the US in 1998, first working as a freelance journalist from Los Angeles, before moving to New York City. Here, he worked at several German language newspapers serving the German-American community, holding positions as editor-in-chief of the New Yorker Staats-Zeitung, German World magazine and editor of the Amerika Woche.

In 2001, Halter went back to his economical roots when he started as a reporter and columnist for Wall Street Correspondents, a financial news company founded and at the time run by well-known German TV reporter Markus Koch. During his time with the company, Halter was witness to the terror attacks of September 11, 2001 and reported about the events for several newspapers and radio stations.

Between 2006 and 2015, Halter regularly reported financial news from the trading floor of the New York Stock Exchange, the Nasdaq and the Nymex for German news station n-tv. He was also a regular correspondent for German news daily Tagesspiegel as well as for German magazine Business & Diplomacy. In 2018, Halter helped develop Wirtschaft_plus, an op-ed format on Deutsche Welle. He is a regular guest on DW News as well as economic programs on Channels TV in Lagos, Nigeria and BusinessLive in South Africa.

== German-American work ==
Halter is a former Chairman of the German-American Steuben Parade.

The German government honored his achievements with the Cross of the Order of Merit of the Federal Republic of Germany, or "Verdienstkreuz am Bande", on March 16, 2015, in New York City.

== Personal life ==
Halter lives in Berlin, Germany with his wife and two sons.

In 2010, Halter appeared as an extra in the Oliver Stone movie Wall Street: Money Never Sleeps.
