= Karst lake =

Lakes formed as a result of the collapse of caves

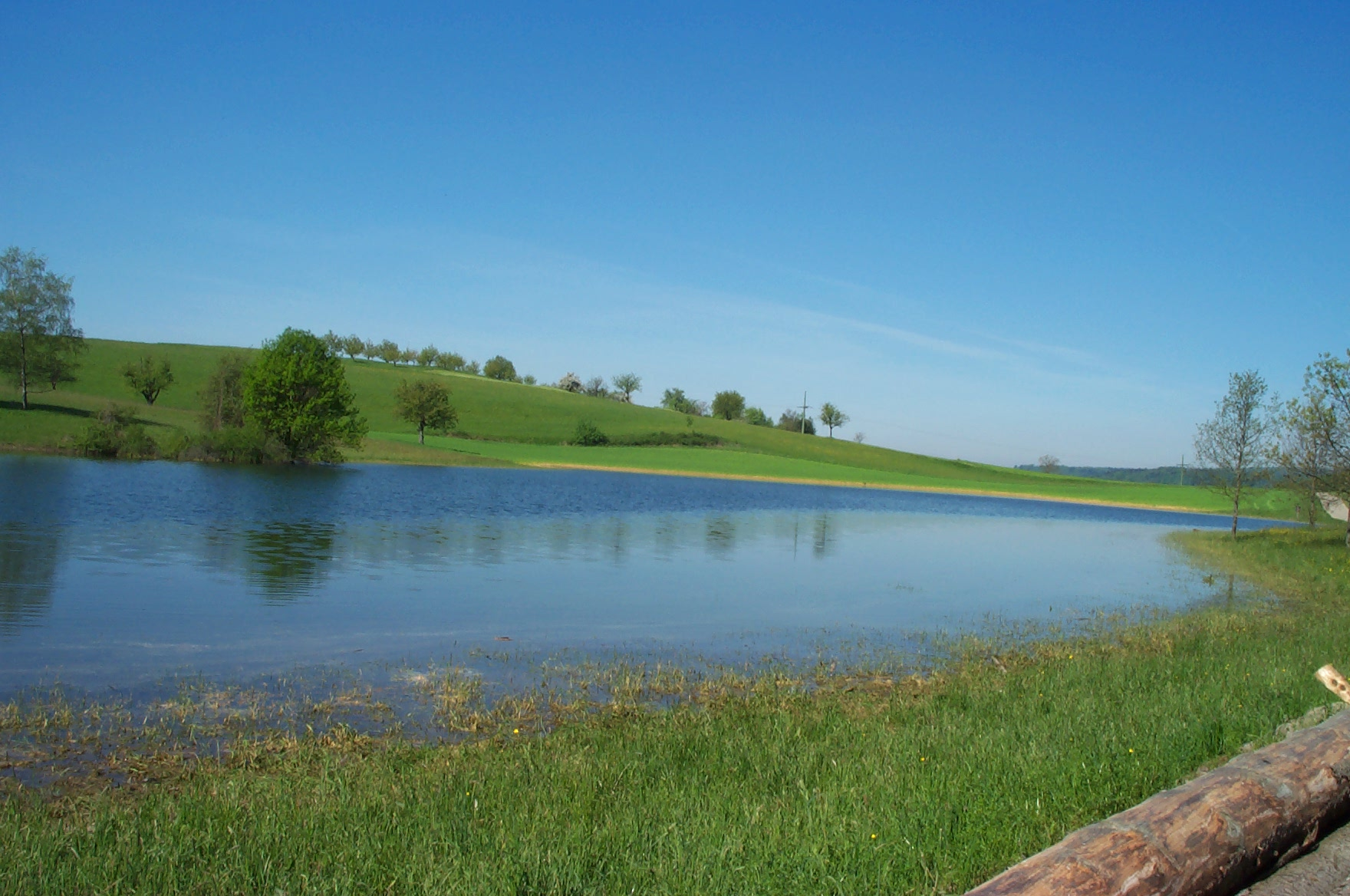
The Eichener See, a temporary (astatic) karst lake near Schopfheim-Eichen in Baden-Württemberg, Germany

Karst lakes are formed as the result of a collapse of caves, especially in water-soluble rocks such as limestone, gypsum and dolomite. This process is known as karstification. They can cover areas of several hundred square kilometres. Their shallow lakebed is usually an insoluble layer of sediment so that water is impounded, leading to the formation of lakes. Many karst lakes only exist periodically, but return regularly after heavy rainfall.

== Distribution ==
Karst lakes are found in the area around the Harz Mountains of Germany (e. g. the Juessee and the Bauerngraben in the South Harz Karst Landscape Biosphere Reserve, an episodic karst lake on the Karst Trail), in South Germany (e.g. the Eichener See), in France in the region of Quercy, in Estonia the Tudre and the region of Salajõe, in Slovenia (e. g. the Cerkniško jezero), in Montenegro and Albania (e.g., Lake Skadar), in Ireland the so-called turloughs (there is also a turlough in Wales: Pant-y-llyn near Llandeilo), some in the United States and also in Italy (Andalo lake). Even the cenotes in the north of the Mexican peninsula of Yucatán, which were known by the Mayans, may be classed as karst lakes. In Croatia there are group of connected lakes called Baćinska jezera, close to Bosnia and Herzegovina where both temporary and permanent karstic lakes regular phenomenon in poljes, such as Mostarsko Blato, Livanjsko, Fatničko, and Glamočko Polje with seasonal lakes forming in springtime, while permanent lakes are dependent on karst wellsprings, such as lakes of Hutovo Blato.

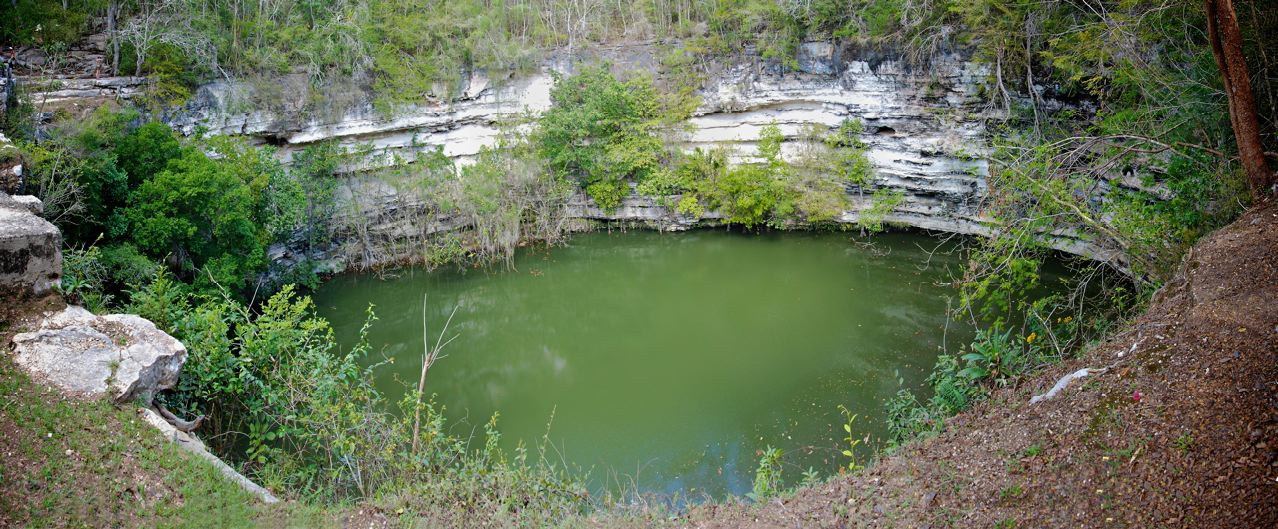
The Cenote Sagrado near Chichen Itza is one of the best known karst lakes in Yucatán

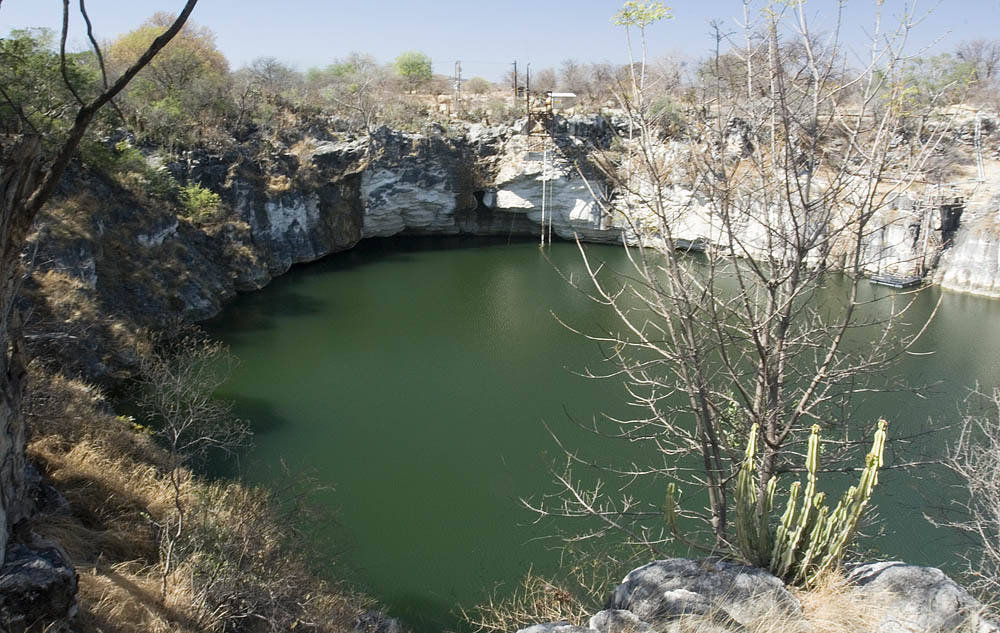
The Otjikoto Lake in Namibia is a permanent karst lake

== See also ==
- Karst spring
