= Baćina lakes =

Baćina Lakes
- Baćinska jezera (Croatian)
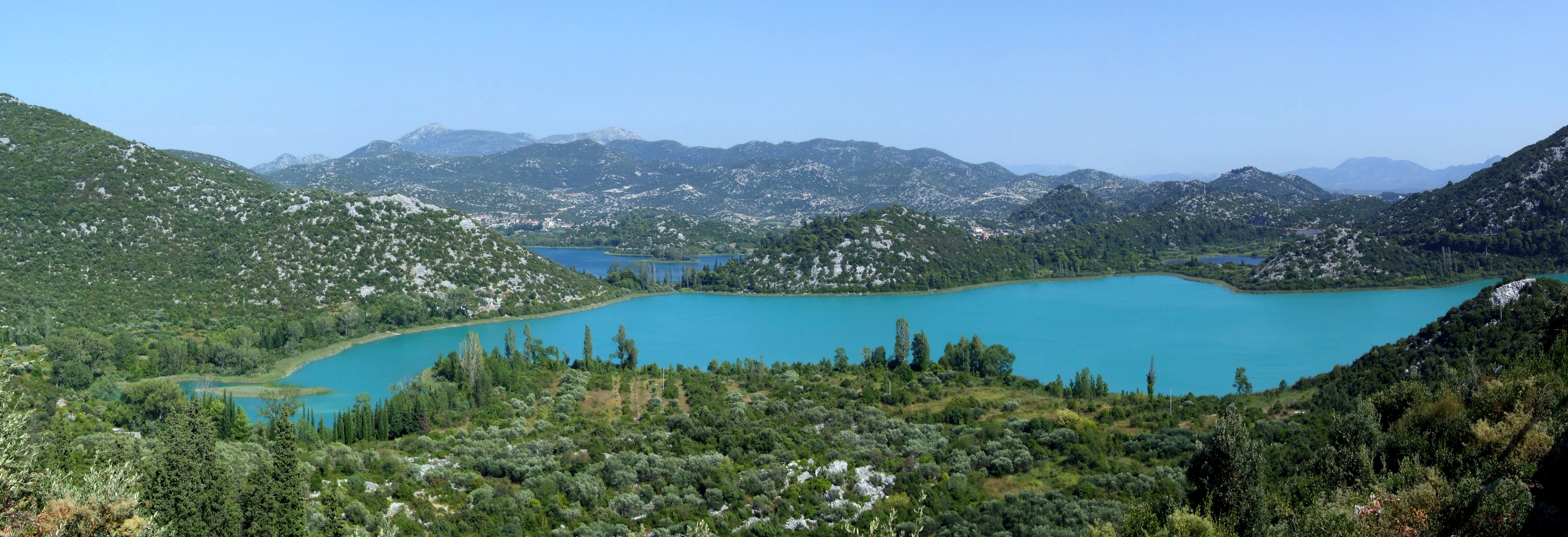
- Interactive map of Baćina Lakes
- Location: Dalmatia, Croatia
- Coordinates: 43°4′38″N 17°25′7″E
- Type: Karstic lakes
- Basin countries: Croatia
- Surface area: 138 ha (340 acres)
- Surface elevation: 80 cm (31 in)

The Baćina lakes (Croatian: Baćinska jezera) are located in Dalmatia, Croatia. The lakes are named after the inland town of Baćina close to the port city of Ploče. The karstic lakes are part of a picturesque landscape and surrounded by mountains. They are situated between Makarska and Dubrovnik. It is a crypto-depression lake, with its bottom below the surface of the sea.

== Description ==
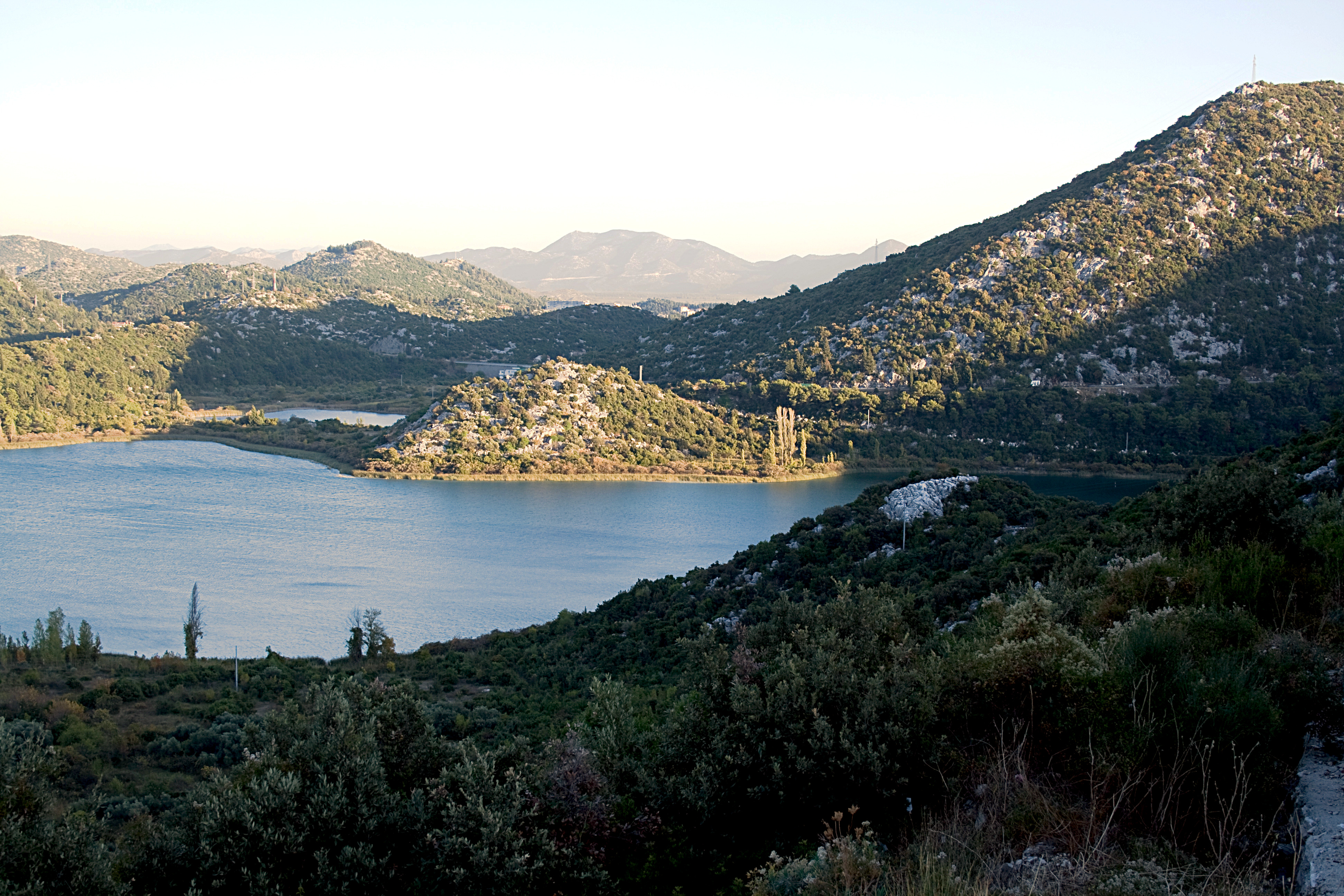
View of the Baćina lakes

Despite its proximity to the sea and the permeable nature of the karst area, they are fresh water lakes. The seven lakes cover an area of 138 ha (340 acres) and they are named Oćuša, Crniševo, Podgora, Sladinac, Vrbnik, Šipak and Plitko. Six of these lakes are linked. The only isolated lake is Vrbnik.The largest lake is Oćuša and the deepest is the Crniševo (34 m (112 ft)). The lakes are connected with the sea and at times the water can be brackish, also the surface of the lakes lies 80 cm (31 in) above sea level. Salty water is found at the bottom of the deepest lake Crniševo.

Lake Vrgorac (Croatian: Vrgorsko jezero) located to the north of the Baćina lakes drains into the Adriatic Sea through them.

At the turn of the century the Austro-Hungarian government built a tunnel to the sea. This led to the lowering of the lake level which has brought about biological changes. The tunnel currently runs underneath the Adriatic Highway.

In recent times the lake has become a well-known hunting ground for grey mullet (Mugil saliens).
