= Erdmanns Cave =

Cave in Baden-Württemberg, Germany

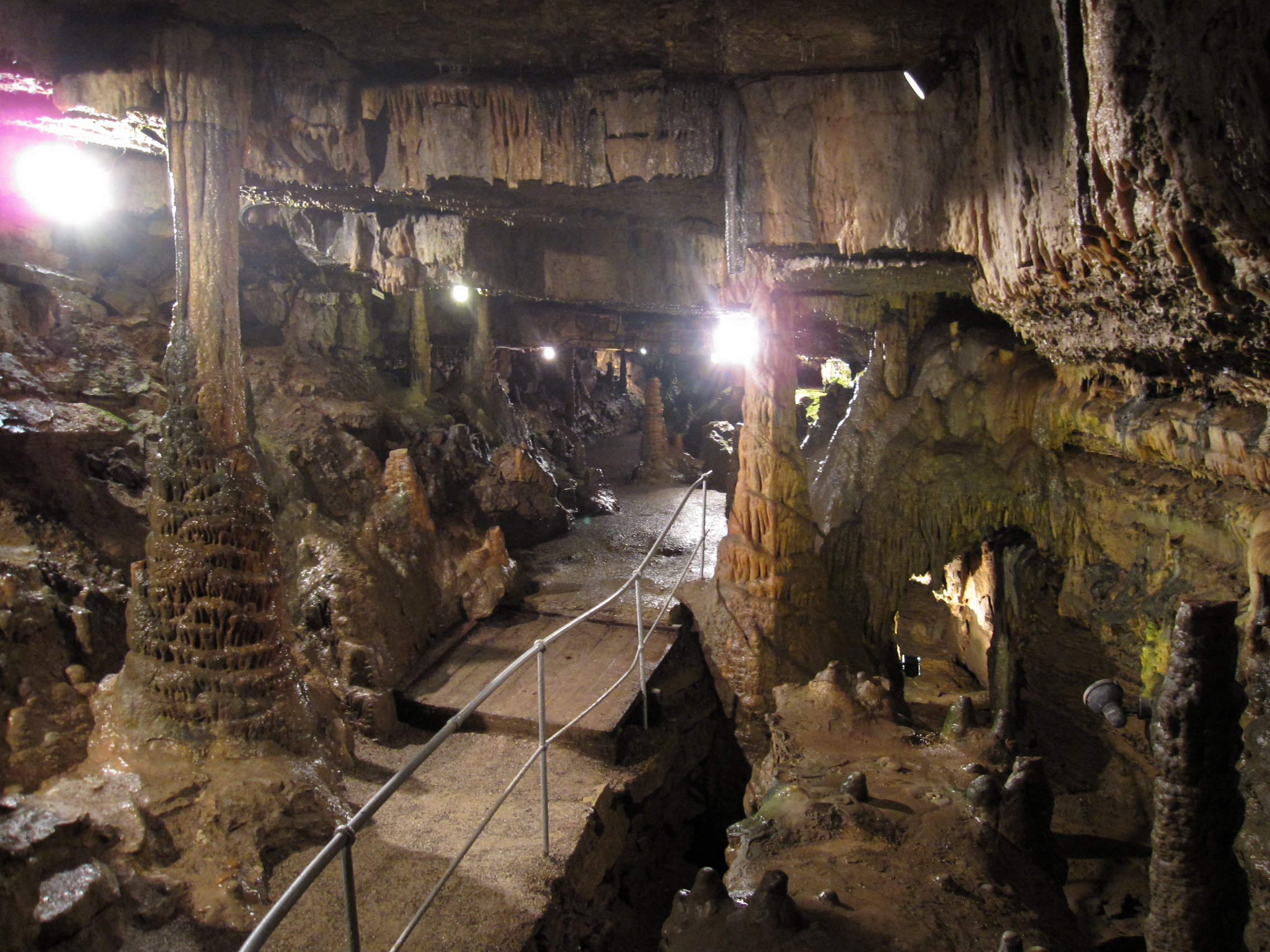
- Interactive map of Erdmanns Cave
- Location: near Hasel, Black Forest, Germany
- Coordinates: 47°38′57″N 7°53′45″E
- Length: 2315 m
- Discovery: 1271
- Geology: Dripstone cave
- Show cave opened: 1773
- Show cave length: 356 m
- Lighting: electric (since 1899)
- Visitors: 24,163 (2010)
- Website: Official website

The Erdmannshöhle is a stalactite or flowstone cave in the village Hasel between Schopfheim and Wehr, 20 km east of Lörrach in Baden-Württemberg in Germany.

== Name ==
The word Erdmannshöhle is comparable to earth man's hole and composed of the three German nouns Erde (earth), Mann (man) and Höhle (cave). Erdmann is also a German forename and a surname. As a forename, it was often given to show the connection with the earth.

In the Baroque, the Republic of Venice sent mineralogical prospectors to the countries north of the Alps to look for the raw materials which were necessary for glassmaking. These prospectors were called "Venetians" everywhere else and only in the Black Forest were they called "Stumm-Männle" (meaning "dumb little men", because they did not speak with the local people). They were mostly very small, wore an ankle-long tunic with a hood-like cowl of a monk and carefully avoided contact. These mysterious migrants, that worked underground and entered with an empty sack which was filled when they emerged from the mountain, are the prototype of what the legend turned into the "little men of the earth" who were seeking or hiding treasures in the galleries of the mountains.

== Legend ==
In the present case, there is a legend which speaks of Erdmännlein: this is the diminutive of Erdmann. Männlein can be translated as manikin or little man (dwarf). Erdmännlein - or its variant Erdmännchen - is also the German word for meerkat, a small animal that can resemble a tiny man.

According to the legend, the "little men of the earth" who gave their name to the Erdmannshöhle were small men which were hardworking and kind and above all helpful.

== Description ==
Caves are rarely in the Black Forest, because in the predominant rock types, which are granite and buntsandstein, its formation is uncommon. Very different is the situation in the mountain massif of the Dinkelberg between High Rhine, Wiese valley and Wehra valley where muschelkalk predominates which allows the formation of holes by erosion processes.

The Erdmannshöhle in Hasel is one of the oldest caves of its type in Germany. The measured total length of the cave is 2,185 meters, the part of the cave open to sightseeing is 360 meters long.

The largest stalactite in the cave, which is mentioned in the Guinness Book of Records, has a height of more than 4 meters and is 2 meters thick at the bottom. Its estimated age is about 135,000 years.
