= Andrew L. Erdman =

American writer and psychotherapist

Andrew Lee Erdman (born 1965) is an American writer and independent scholar. He is the author of three books: Blue Vaudeville: Sex, Morals, and the Mass Marketing of Amusement, 1895–1915 (McFarland, 2004), Queen of Vaudeville: The Story of Eva Tanguay (Cornell University Press, 2012) and Beautiful: The Story of Julian Eltinge, America's Greatest Female Impersonator (Oxford University Press, 2024).

Erdman was born in 1965 in Brooklyn, New York. He received a bachelor's degree from New York University in 1988. He earned a doctorate in theatre studies from the City University of New York in 2001, under the supervision of Daniel C. Gerould.
