= Hohe Flum =

Coordinates: 47°37′36″N 7°48′40″E

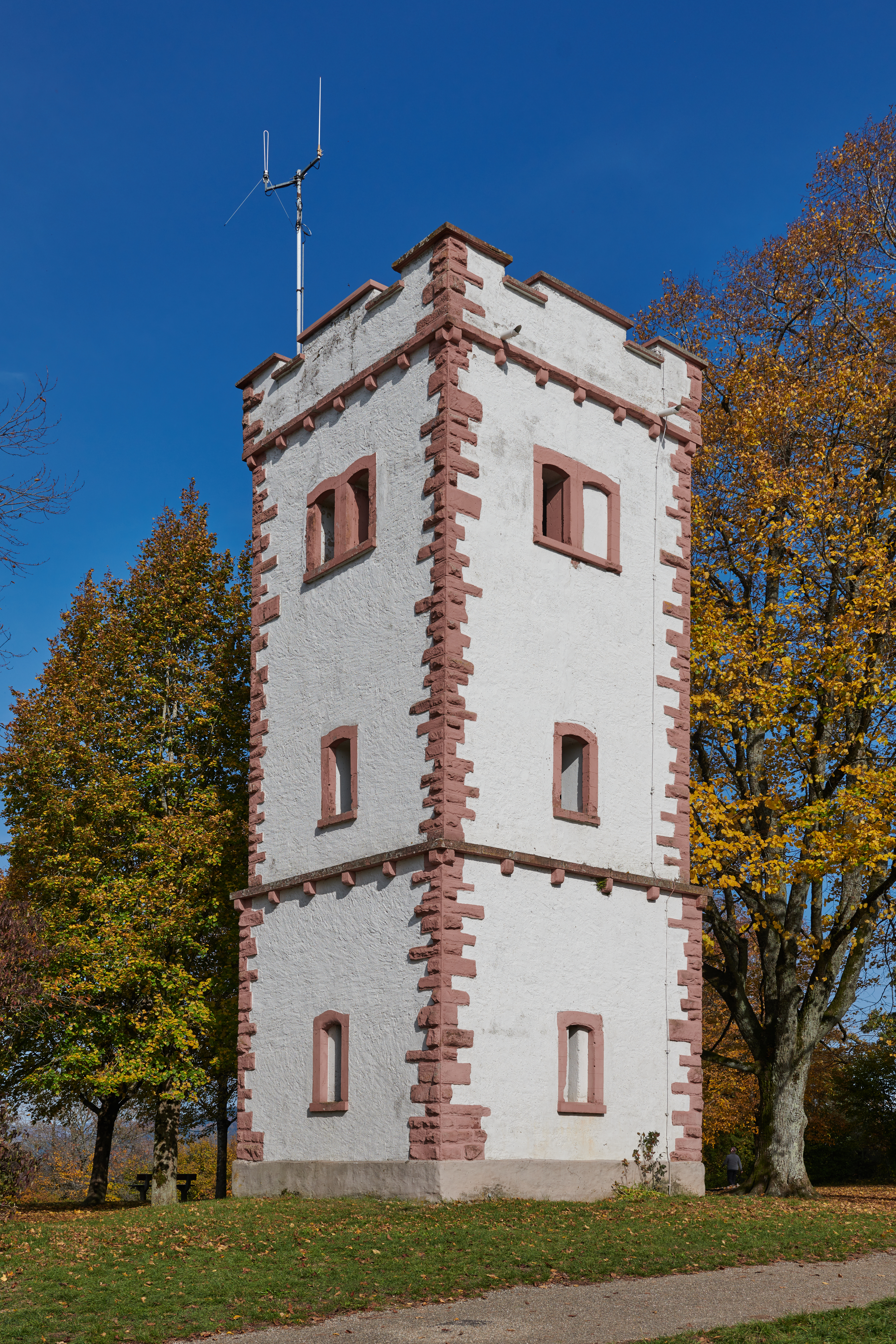
- Tower on Hohe Flum

Highest point
- Elevation: 536.2 m (1,759 ft)

Geography
- Location: Baden-Württemberg, Germany

Hohe Flum is a mountain of Baden-Württemberg, Germany.
