= Ralph Erdmann =

American pathologist and criminal (1926–2010)

Ralph R. Erdmann (August 8, 1926 - July 23, 2010) was a contract medical examiner (forensic pathologist) who was convicted on several counts of evidence tampering and perjury for examinations he did beginning in the early 1980s throughout rural Texas.

== Early years in Texas ==
In 1981, 25 years after receiving a medical degree in Mexico Erdmann moved to Childress, Childress County, Texas. He started doing autopsies for five small area hospitals on a private contract basis. In 1983 he expanded his practice to the entire Texas panhandle area to the Rio Grande. During the next ten years Erdmann performed over 3,000 autopsies in 41 different jurisdictions. During his busiest year in 1990 he did 480 autopsies. In 1991 he did 310 autopsies, most of which were in Lubbock County. He charged Lubbock an annual fee of $140,000, and the smaller counties paid him $650 for each autopsy he performed.

== Texas autopsy scandal ==
In 1992, he was convicted of falsifying autopsy reports. The scandal began in 1991 when the family of Robert Craig Newman questioned the findings of an autopsy report. It included information about the weight of the dead man's spleen and gall bladder. The deceased man's son told authorities that his dead father had had his spleen removed years earlier. When the body was exhumed, there was no evidence that an autopsy had even been performed. In another case Erdmann claimed to have examined a woman's brain, but there was no sign any cut had been made. In another case of a murder, authorities from Odessa said Erdmann had misplaced the head of the victim. Without the head, where the bullet wound was located, there was no evidence and the charges against the accused murderer had to be dropped. Several lawsuits had to be settled as a result of Erdmann's incompetence. In one case Lubbock County paid a man $15,000 for wrongful imprisonment after the man spent for months in jail charged with the death of his infant son. A second autopsy by a competent pathologist revealed the death had been an accidental drowning. Erdmann was not just incompetent, but he was also corrupt. In 1995 Erdmann was indicted on charges of perjury and tampering with evidence relating to the trial of Johnny Lee Rey in 1990. Rey was on death row for two years based on Erdmann's testimony, which was found to be false.

== Convictions ==
He pleaded no contest to seven felony charges. He was sentenced to 10 years probation, 200 hours of community service and fined $17,000 for botched autopsies and exhumation expenses. He also surrendered his medical license and moved to Washington state.

As a convicted felon it was unlawful for Erdmann to own guns, but in 1995, police found 122 weapons including shotguns, handguns and a fully automatic M-16 rifle. The weapons were confiscated from his Redmond, Washington home. Two years later he was released.

Attorney Millard Farmer (lead defense for the Dawson Five) whom represented a defendant for the 1992 case against Ralph was disbarred in 2019 and found liable in a federal civil racketeering case, concluding he’d committed attempted theft by extortion, attempted bribery and influencing witnesses, among other acts.

== 60-Minutes ==
Erdmann's story was once the topic of a 60-Minutes news story segment.

== Teacher's assistant ==
In 1994, after he moved to Washington State, he found work as a teacher's assistant for special education in the Lake Washington School District. He worked 86 days at Rose Hill Junior High School and 32 days as a school-bus assistant.

== External sources ==
- Fight the Death Penalty in USA
- [1] Actual Innocence : Five Days to Execution, and Other Dispatches From the Wrongly Convicted - Barry Scheck, Peter Neufeld, Jim Dwyer (Doubleday, 2000) ISBN 0-385-49341-X
