= Schwörstadt =

- Municipality
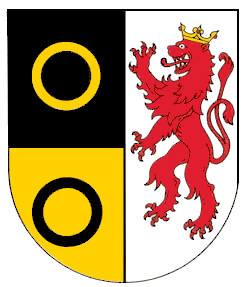
- Coat of arms

- Location of Schwörstadt within Lörrach district
- Interactive map of Schwörstadt
- Location within Germany Location within Baden-Württemberg
- Coordinates: 47°35′34″N 7°52′49″E
- Country: Germany
- State: Baden-Württemberg
- Admin. region: Freiburg
- District: Lörrach
- Subdivisions: 2

Government
  - Mayor (2017–25): Christine Trautwein-Domschat

Area
  - Total: 20.08 km^{2} (7.75 sq mi)
- Elevation: 298 m (978 ft)

Population (2025-12-31)
  - Total: 2,578
  - Density: 128.4/km^{2} (332.5/sq mi)
- Time zone: UTC+01:00 (CET)
  - Summer (DST): UTC+02:00 (CEST)
- Postal codes: 79739
- Dialling codes: 07762
- Vehicle registration: LÖ
- Website: www.schwoerstadt.de

Schwörstadt (German pronunciation: [ˈʃvøːɐ̯ʃtat]) is a municipality in the district of Lörrach in Baden-Württemberg in Germany.
