= Hasel, Germany =

Hasel
- Municipality
- Coat of arms

- Location of Hasel within Lörrach district
- Interactive map of Hasel
- Location within Germany Location within Baden-Württemberg
- Coordinates: 47°39′16″N 7°53′52″E
- Country: Germany
- State: Baden-Württemberg
- Admin. region: Freiburg
- District: Lörrach

Government
  - Mayor (2022–30): Frank-Michael Littwin

Area
  - Total: 11.65 km^{2} (4.50 sq mi)
- Elevation: 425 m (1,394 ft)

Population (2025-12-31)
  - Total: 1,256
  - Density: 107.8/km^{2} (279.2/sq mi)
- Time zone: UTC+01:00 (CET)
  - Summer (DST): UTC+02:00 (CEST)
- Postal codes: 79686
- Dialling codes: 07762
- Vehicle registration: LÖ
- Website: www.gemeinde-hasel.de

Hasel (German pronunciation: [ˈhaːzl̩]) is a municipality in the district of Lörrach in Baden-Württemberg in Germany.

The placename was first mentioned in a document dated 7 June 820 in which the monastery of St. Gallen lent its property in "Hasalaho" as a fief. In all probability the placename refers to a place of jurisdiction and execution of the Alamanni that was enclosed by hazel pales. The German word "Hasel" which is the placename means the same as the English "Hazel".

It has been said that this is the location of The Dwarves' Cavern which was supposedly once home to many dwarves. This legend gives the cavern its name.

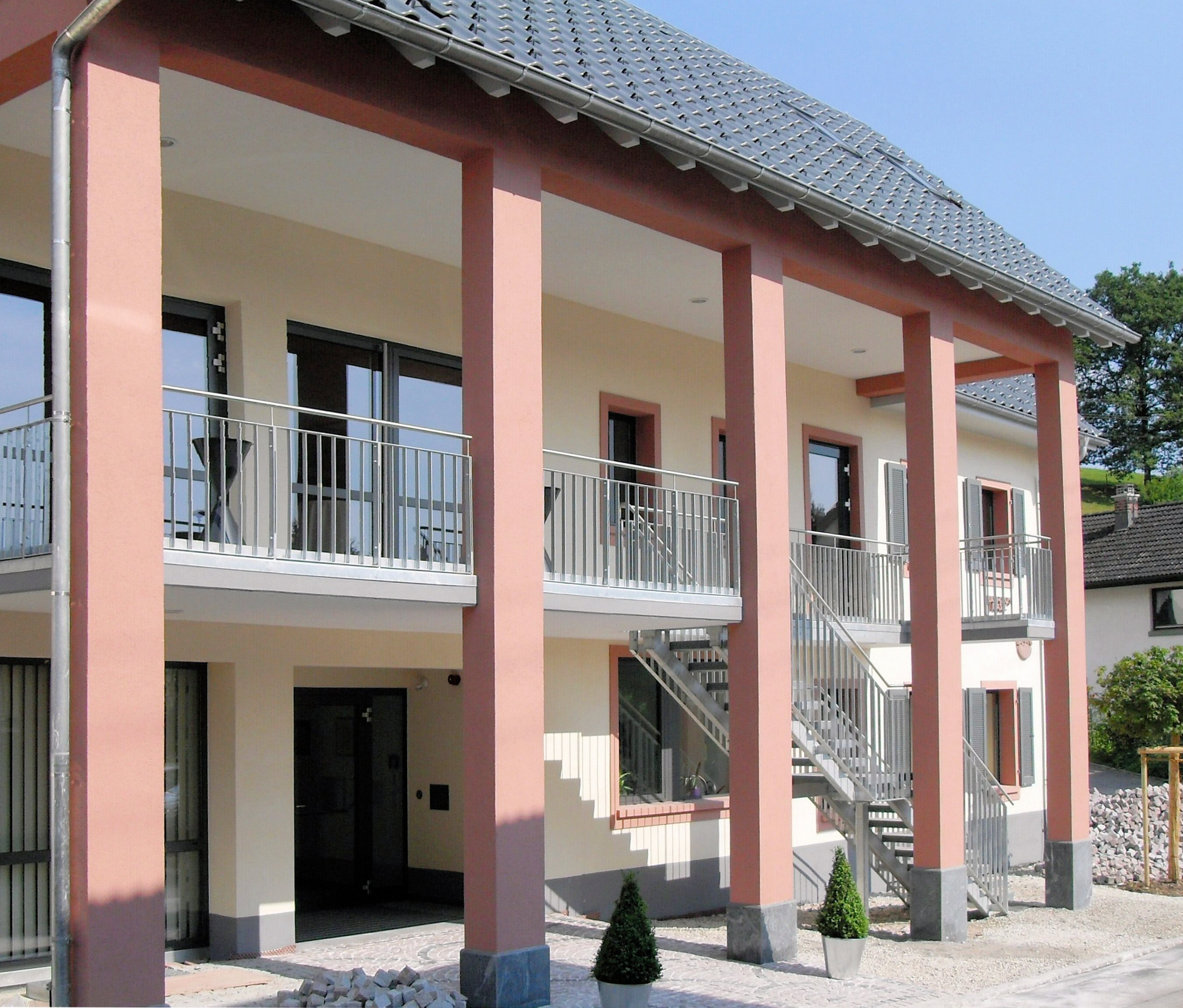
Hasel Town Hall

The preceding statement may refer to the Erdmannshöhle where the legend is, however, not about dwarfs (which is "Zwerge" in German), but rather "Erdmännlein" which can be translated as "manikin of the earth" and which seem to have a different origin. It is, however, possible that the "dwarvers" have their origin in the "Erdmännlein".

== Places of interest ==
- Erdmannshöhle
