= Bettingen =

- Municipality
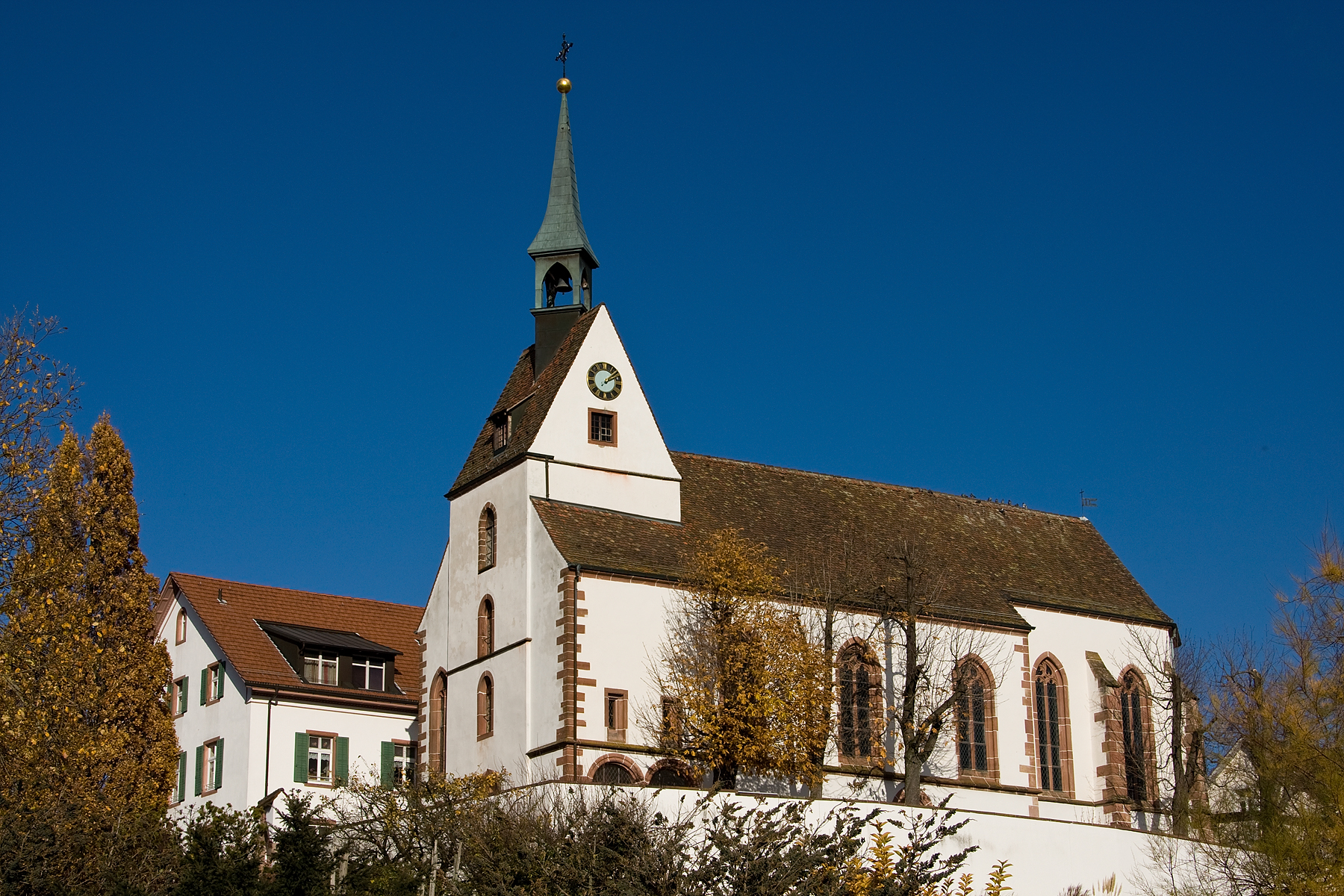
- Bettingen village church

- Flag Coat of arms
- Location of Bettingen
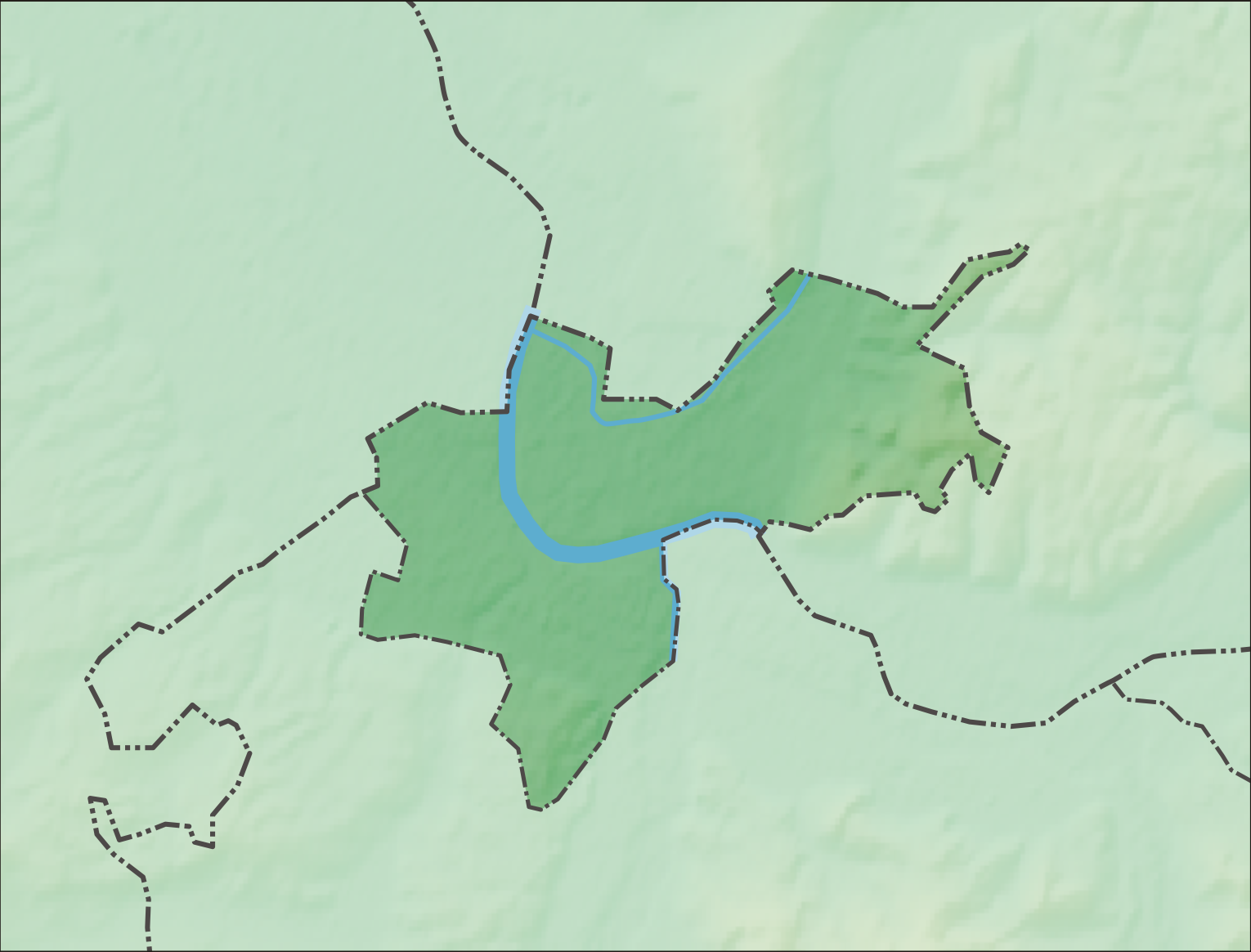
- Location within Switzerland Location within Canton of Basel-Stadt
- Coordinates: 47°34′17″N 7°39′51″E
- Country: Switzerland
- Canton: Basel-Stadt
- District: n.a.

Government
  - Mayor: Willi Bertschmann-Unholz

Area
  - Total: 2.23 km^{2} (0.86 sq mi)
- Elevation: 378 m (1,240 ft)
- Highest elevation (St. Chrischona): 522.19 m (1,713.2 ft)

Population (July 2021)
  - Total: 1,248
  - Density: 560/km^{2} (1,450/sq mi)
- Time zone: UTC+01:00 (CET)
  - Summer (DST): UTC+02:00 (CEST)
- Postal code: 4126
- SFOS number: 2702
- ISO 3166 code: CH-BS
- Surrounded by: Grenzach-Wyhlen (DE-BW), Inzlingen (DE-BW), Riehen
- Twin towns: Safien (Switzerland)
- Website: www.bettingen.ch

Bettingen (Swiss German: Bettige) is a municipality in the canton of Basel-Stadt in Switzerland.

== History ==
Bettingen is first mentioned in 777 as Bettingen.

== Geography ==
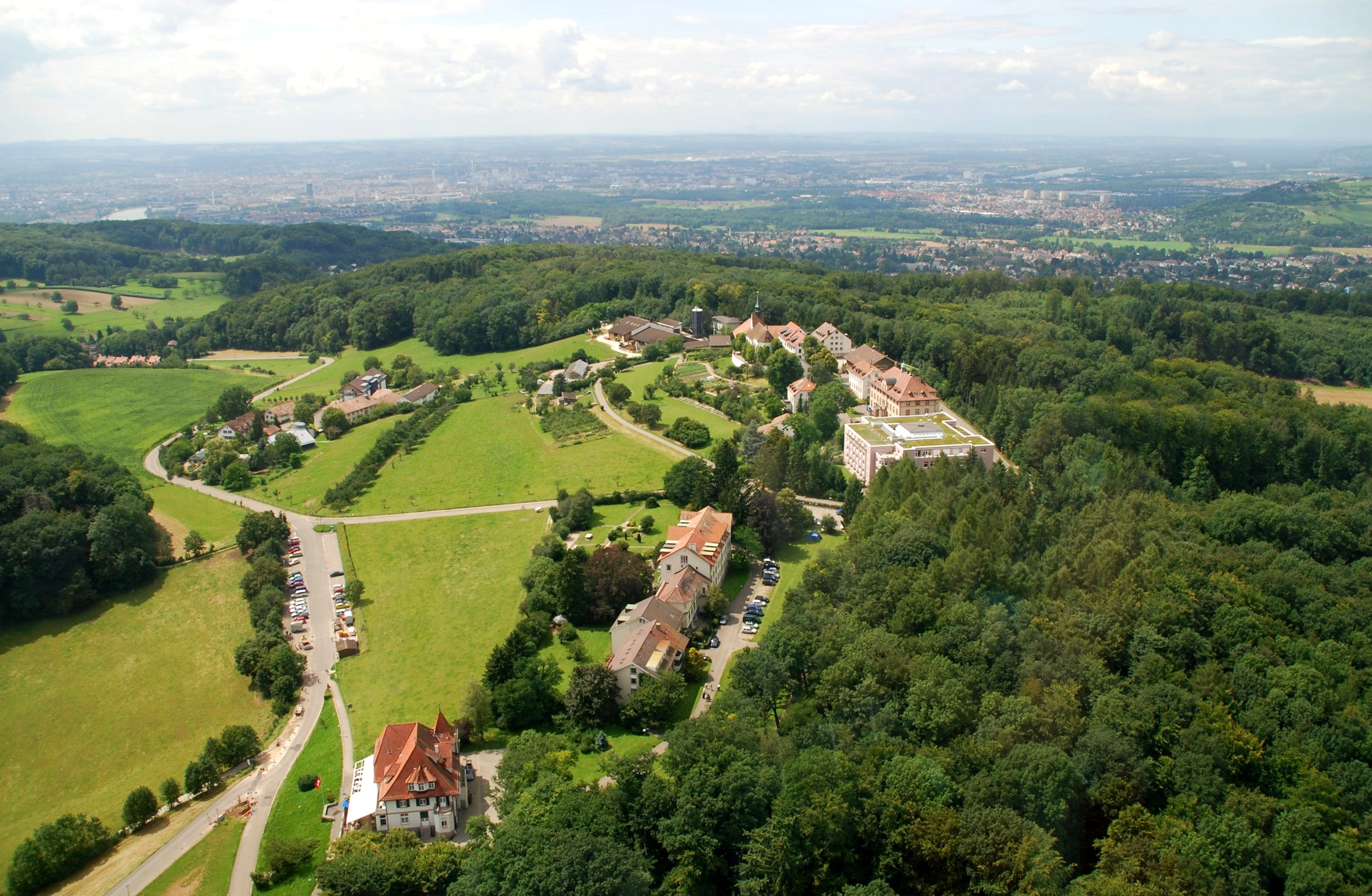
View of Bettingen (and Basel in the background) from the communications tower on St. Chrischona

Aerial view (1953)

Bettingen has an area, as of 2009, of 2.23 square kilometers (0.86 sq mi). Of this area, 0.76 km^{2} (0.29 sq mi) or 34.1% is used for agricultural purposes, while 1 km^{2} (0.39 sq mi) or 44.8% is forested. Of the rest of the land, 0.42 km^{2} (0.16 sq mi) or 18.8% is settled (buildings or roads).

Of the built up area, housing and buildings made up 14.8% and transportation infrastructure made up 1.8%. while parks, green belts and sports fields made up 2.2%. Out of the forested land, 43.5% of the total land area is heavily forested and 1.3% is covered with orchards or small clusters of trees. Of the agricultural land, 15.2% is used for growing crops and 14.8% is pastures, while 4.0% is used for orchards or vine crops.

The municipality is located in the agglomeration of Basel, on the right bank of the Rhine river and on the slopes of St. Chrischona.

Bettingen is split into two settlements. Dorf Bettingen is an Alemannic settlement, located in a small basin. Chrischonahöhe is the other settlement, located around a St. Chrischona pilgrimage centre (established 1840) on one of the hills. As early as 1356 a church was built on the heights, dedicated to Saint Chrischona. Since 1925 there have been a hospital and retirement homes in the area.

A landmark for Bettingen, the Swisscom-Sendeturm St. Chrischona communications tower is located on the Chrischonahöhe.

== Coat of arms ==
The blazon of the municipal coat of arms is Argent, a Cup Gules.

== Demographics ==
Bettingen has a population (as of July 2021) of 1,248. As of 2008, 24.2% of the population are resident foreign nationals. Over the last 10 years (1999–2009) the population has changed at a rate of -1.2%. It has changed at a rate of 2.7% due to migration and at a rate of -2.7% due to births and deaths.

Most of the population (as of 2000) speaks German (1,091 or 94.8%), with French being second most common (13 or 1.1%) and English being third (10 or 0.9%).

Of the population in the municipality 171 or about 14.9% were born in Bettingen and lived there in 2000. There were 329 or 28.6% who were born in the same canton, while 343 or 29.8% were born somewhere else in Switzerland, and 282 or 24.5% were born outside of Switzerland.

In 2008 there were 5 live births to Swiss citizens and 5 births to non-Swiss citizens, and in same time span there were 10 deaths of Swiss citizens. Ignoring immigration and emigration, the population of Swiss citizens decreased by 5 while the foreign population increased by 5. There were 4 Swiss men who immigrated back to Switzerland. At the same time, there were 7 non-Swiss men and 11 non-Swiss women who immigrated from another country to Switzerland. The total Swiss population change in 2008 (from all sources, including moves across municipal borders) was a decrease of 14 and the non-Swiss population increased by 21 people. This represents a population growth rate of 0.6%.

As of 2000, there were 480 people who were single and never married in the municipality. There were 555 married individuals, 61 widows or widowers and 55 individuals who are divorced.

As of 2000, there were 427 private households in the municipality, and an average of 2.4 persons per household. There were 125 households that consist of only one person and 33 households with five or more people. Out of a total of 446 households that answered this question, 28.0% were households made up of just one person and there were 4 adults who lived with their parents. Of the rest of the households, there are 142 married couples without children, 134 married couples with children There were 18 single parents with a child or children. There were 4 households that were made up of unrelated people and 19 households that were made up of some sort of institution or another collective housing.

In 2000 there were 193 single family homes (or 69.9% of the total) out of a total of 276 inhabited buildings. There were 42 multi-family buildings (15.2%), along with 26 multi-purpose buildings that were mostly used for housing (9.4%) and 15 other use buildings (commercial or industrial) that also had some housing (5.4%). Of the single family homes 12 were built before 1919, while 21 were built between 1990 and 2000. The greatest number of single family homes (55) were built between 1961 and 1970.

In 2000 there were 458 apartments in the municipality. The most common apartment size was 5 rooms of which there were 115. There were 20 single room apartments and 219 apartments with five or more rooms. Of these apartments, a total of 417 apartments (91.0% of the total) were permanently occupied, while 26 apartments (5.7%) were seasonally occupied and 15 apartments (3.3%) were empty. As of 2009, the construction rate of new housing units was 0.8 new units per 1000 residents. The vacancy rate for the municipality, in 2010, was 1.01%.

The historical population is given in the following chart:

== Sights ==
The entire hill and surrounding area of St. Chrischona is designated as part of the Inventory of Swiss Heritage Sites.

== Politics ==
In the 2007 federal election the most popular party was the LPS Party which received 21.6% of the vote. The next three most popular parties were the FDP (17.41%), the EVP Party (17.37%) and the SP (14.23%). In the federal election, a total of 479 votes were cast, and the voter turnout was 65.4%.

== Economy ==
As of 2010, Bettingen had an unemployment rate of 1.9%. As of 2008, there were 10 people employed in the primary economic sector and about 2 businesses involved in this sector. 10 people were employed in the secondary sector and there were 5 businesses in this sector. 416 people were employed in the tertiary sector, with 31 businesses in this sector. There were 581 residents of the municipality who were employed in some capacity, of which females made up 44.8% of the workforce.

In 2008 the total number of full-time equivalent jobs was 292. The number of jobs in the primary sector was 5, all of which were in agriculture. The number of jobs in the secondary sector was 10 of which 1 was in manufacturing and 9 (90.0%) were in construction. The number of jobs in the tertiary sector was 277. In the tertiary sector; 13 or 4.7% were in wholesale or retail sales or the repair of motor vehicles, 1 was in the movement and storage of goods, 28 or 10.1% were in a hotel or restaurant, 5 or 1.8% were in the information industry, 8 or 2.9% were technical professionals or scientists, 7 or 2.5% were in education and 115 or 41.5% were in health care.

In 2000, there were 264 workers who commuted into the municipality and 366 workers who commuted away. The municipality is a net exporter of workers, with about 1.4 workers leaving the municipality for every one entering. About 17.4% of the workforce coming into Bettingen are coming from outside Switzerland, while 1.1% of the locals commute out of Switzerland for work. Of the working population, 26.3% used public transportation to get to work, and 33% used a private car.

== Religion ==
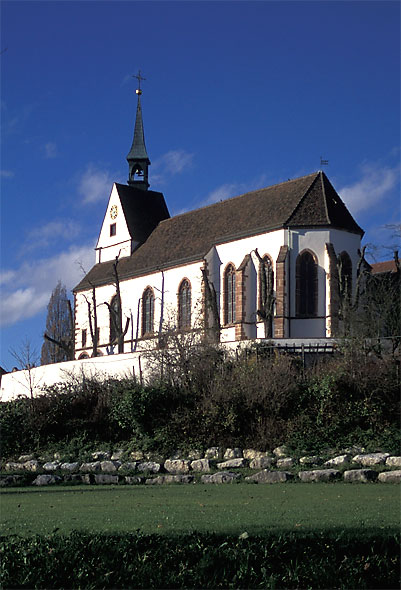
St Chrischona church in Bettingen

From the 2000 census, 203 or 17.6% were Roman Catholic, while 463 or 40.2% belonged to the Swiss Reformed Church. Of the rest of the population, there were 3 members of an Orthodox church (or about 0.26% of the population), there were 4 individuals (or about 0.35% of the population) who belonged to the Christian Catholic Church, and there were 159 individuals (or about 13.81% of the population) who belonged to another Christian church. There was 1 individual who was Jewish, and 3 (or about 0.26% of the population) who were Islamic. There was 1 person who was Buddhist. 282 (or about 24.50% of the population) belonged to no church, are agnostic or atheist, and 32 individuals (or about 2.78% of the population) did not answer the question.

== Education ==
In Bettingen about 480 or (41.7%) of the population have completed non-mandatory upper secondary education, and 302 or (26.2%) have completed additional higher education (either university or a Fachhochschule). Of the 302 who completed tertiary schooling, 50.3% were Swiss men, 24.8% were Swiss women, 12.6% were non-Swiss men and 12.3% were non-Swiss women.

As of 2000, there were 30 students in Bettingen who came from another municipality, while 117 residents attended schools outside the municipality.
