= St. Chrischona =

Coordinates: 47°34′24″N 7°40′49″E

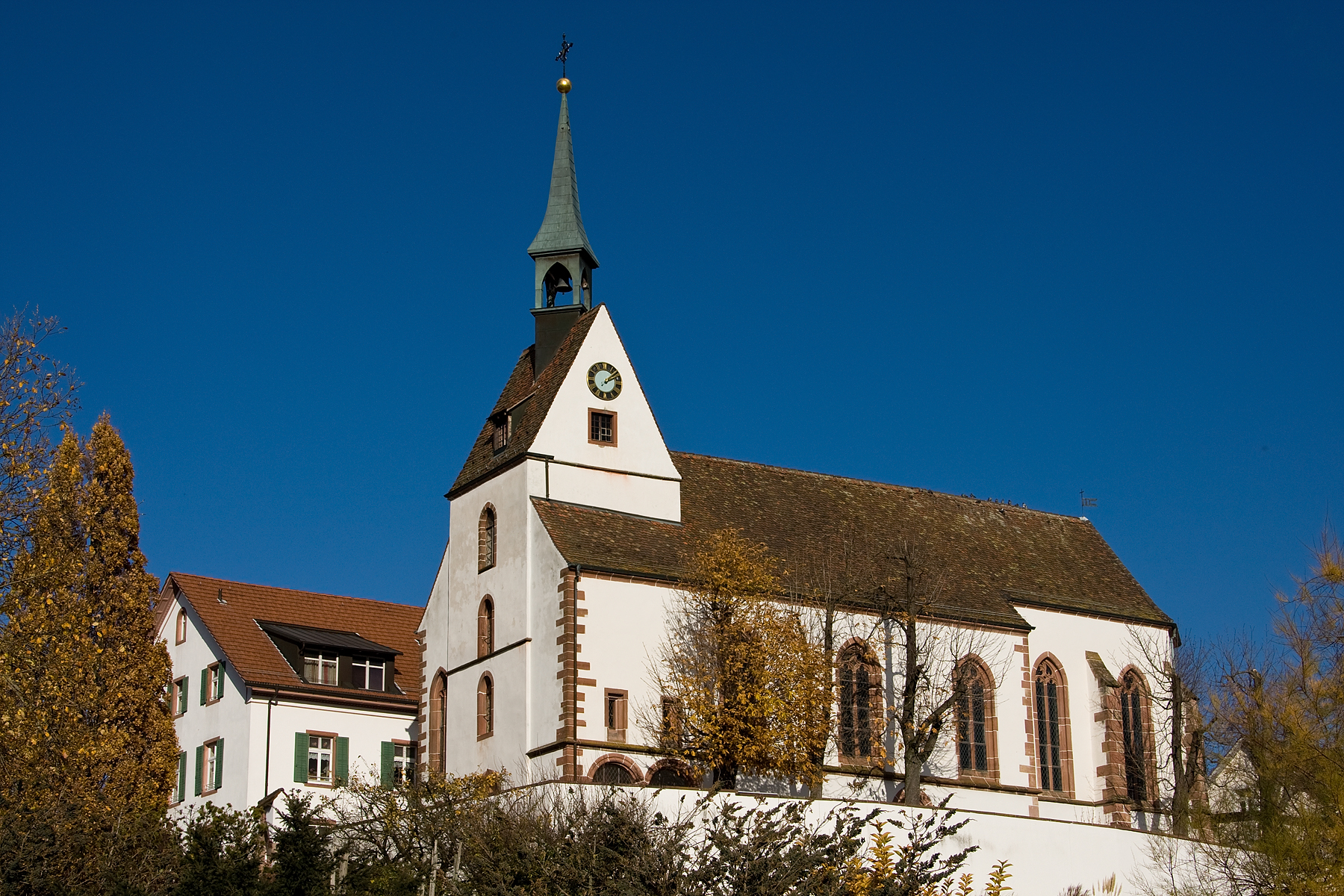
St. Chrischona church

St. Chrischona is a hamlet in the Swiss canton of Basel-Stadt. It is part of the municipality of Bettingen. The centre of the village is located on the highest point of the canton, at 522 metres above sea level.

East of St. Chrischona, near the German border, is located a 250 m high communication tower.

St. Chrischona is the home of the St. Chrischona Pilgrim Mission (Theologisches Seminar St. Chrischona or TSC), an evangelical training school for home and foreign missions, led by Karl Heinrich Rappard (1837–1909) and his wife Dora Rappard.

== See also ==
- Conrad Schick (1822-1901), German architect, archaeologist and evangelical missionary active in Jerusalem
- Moritz Hall (1838-1914), Polish missionary who worked in Ethiopia with the Chrischona Brethren
