= Theodor Sourbeck =

Swiss politician and railway official

- Born: 3 January 1861; Riehen
- Died: 24 October 1940 (aged 79); Zurich
- Occupations: Politician, journalist, railway official
- Spouse: Eva Bernieri

Theodor Sourbeck (also spelled Surbeck; 3 January 1861 – 24 October 1940) was a Swiss politician, journalist, and railway official. He served as a member of the Swiss National Council and held senior positions in Swiss and international transport organizations.

== Life and career ==
Born in Riehen to Johann Jakob Surbeck, a schoolteacher, Sourbeck attended the gymnasium in Basel (1876–1878) before studying philosophy and philology in Zurich (1880–1882). He subsequently worked as editor of the Revue égyptienne in Alexandria.

From 1895, he served as secretary-general of the Swiss Railway Workers' Federation in Bern. Elected to the National Council as a Bernese representative for the social policy group from 1896, he advocated for the nationalization of the railways. After joining the Radical Democratic Party in 1898, he lost his political mandate in 1899 and was dismissed from the Federation in 1902.

He then headed the statistics bureau of the Swiss Federal Railways from 1902 to 1909. In 1909 he was appointed director-general of the Norddeutscher Lloyd for France, based in Paris. He returned to Switzerland in 1917 and worked at the United States consulate in Bern from 1928 to 1933.

== Bibliography ==
- Gruner, L'Assemblée, 1, pp. 230–231
- H. Strebel, Die Diskussion um den Rückkauf der schweizerischen Privatbahnen durch den Bund 1852–1898, 1980
