= Kurt Aepli =

Swiss silversmith (1914–2002)

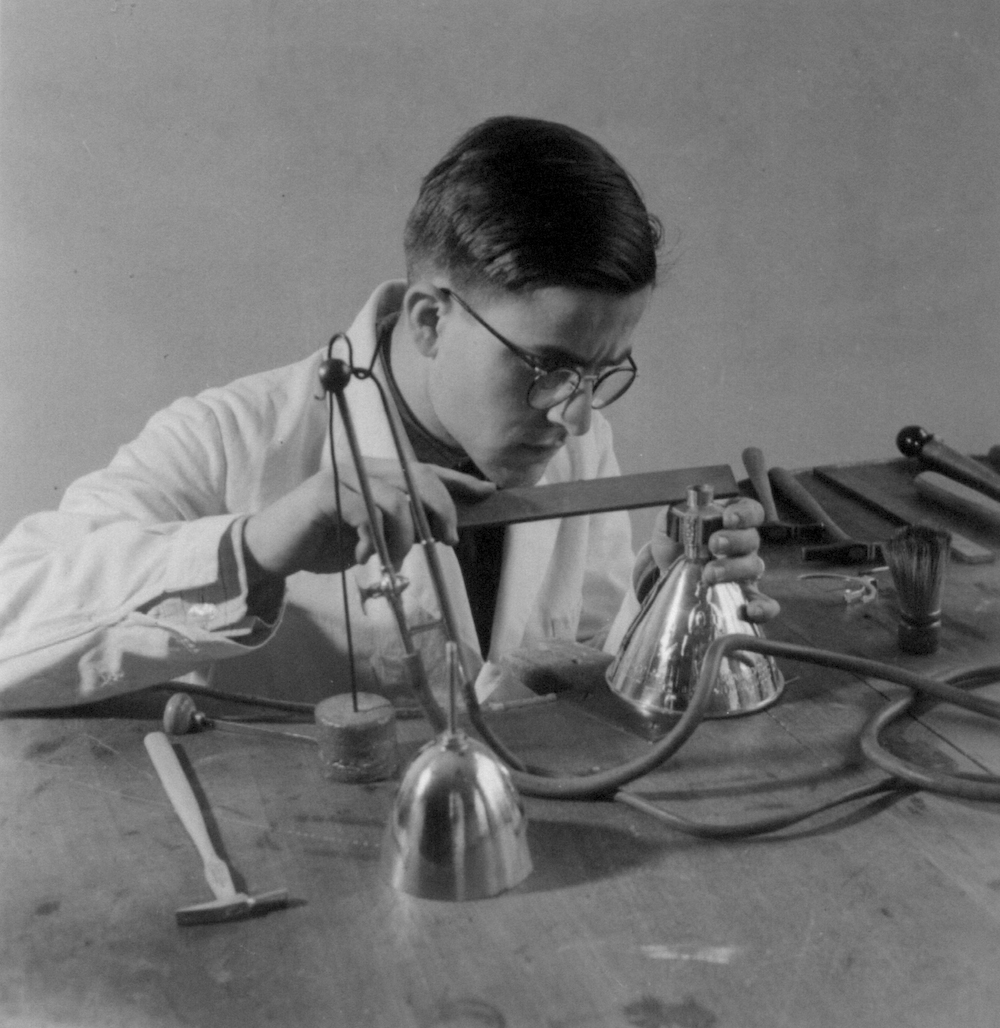
Kurt Aepli working as a student in the Metals class of the Kunstgewerbeschule Zurich, Switzerland

Kurt Aepli (14 May 1914 in Rapperswil, St. Gallen, Switzerland – 22 December 2002 in Uznach, St. Gallen) was a Swiss silversmith, a designer of fine jewelry and implements, as well as a professional educator.

== Life ==
Aepli completed his education as a silversmith at the School of Applied Arts (today, the Berufschule für Gestaltung) in Zurich between 1934 and 1939. Due to the mobilization of the Swiss military during World War II, he went straight on to four years of active duty. In 1942, he took the position of head designer in the studio of Meinrad Burch-Korrodi, and before long he developed the signature style by which both the jewelry and particularly the ecclesiastical implements he designed can be recognized. He left his mark on Christian sacral art in Switzerland during the second half of the 20th century, about the same time as the church builder and designer Fritz Metzger and the painter Ferdinand Gehr. Aepli's creative output peaked during the period of expectation that was associated with the Second Ecumenical Council of the Vatican, 1962 to 1965. The economic boom following the Second World War had been good for the jewelry trade, because when Christoph Trudel took over the business from Meinrad Burch in 1967. Aepli was established and given creative freedom by Trudel Juwelier. Between 1946 and 1980, Aepli was a member of the Swiss Work Federation (Schweizerischer Werkbund, or SWB), an association dedicated to the debate of creative issues and the development of design. The Zurich School of Concrete and Constructive Art made an impression. Artists like Johannes Itten, Max Bill and Richard P. Lohse, but also the Bauhaus were apparent influences throughout Aepli's entire career.

== Creative output ==
The success of the companies Burch-Korrodi and Trudel Juwelier was due in large part to the professional-technical know-how and the creative contribution of Aepli. In the studio of Meinrad Burch, "goldsmith-triumvirate", as it was referred to locally in the trade, eventually developed. It consisted of Aepli (chief designer), Martin Bucher (chef d’atelier) and Berger Bergersen (master enameler), all three of whom were professionally and technically equally adept, complemented one another's respective fields of expertise and worked as a team.

Aepli's style might best be described as the evolution of Modernism, the Bauhaus and Art Déco. Using a scientific approach, compositions methodically evolved from the basic geometric shapes, using nothing but flat, square or round stock. Yet a close observation of nature and its creations led him to conclude that there were no incorrect forms, colors or sounds in nature, which is recognizable throughout his decade-long creative activity.

This dynamic was maximized by the inclusive application of high-value materials. Lines, forms and shapes were pared in a sure-footed manner that was consistent and calculated. As a consequence, these pieces required exacting standards of execution. Jewelry, frequently using unusual gemstones, and ecclesiastical implements were created by him, both at Burch-Korrodi, as well as later at Trudel Juwelier. Besides designing, Aepli frequently carried out the silversmithing jobs himself, normally stamped "A".

Although the clientele consisted mainly of aficionados and collectors, the name of Kurt Aepli was little known to the general public. For decades, his oeuvre was under the studio of Burch-Korrodi. Although this manner of prescribed anonymity bothered him, his style left its mark on goldsmiths and silversmiths, reaching far beyond the German-speaking part of Switzerland, particularly north of the Alps. He set new standards for the creation of jewelry and implements.

== Educational career ==
1945 Kurt Aepli was elected a specialist subject teacher to the School of Arts in Zurich, which remained under the direction of Johannes Itten until 1954. He taught goldsmiths, silversmiths, chasers, engravers, metal spinners, gemstone setters, designers and metal polishers. All student apprentices in the school district of Zurich from these professions learned their respective trade theory, gemology and rendering from him. Besides teaching compulsory trade curricula, Aepli also taught continuing education night classes at the School of Arts in Zurich. He retired from his 35-year career as an educator at the School of Arts in Zurich in April 1980.

== Exhibitions ==
- Swiss National Museum, Zürich: Swiss Jewelry in the 20th Century (Schweizerschmuck im 20. Jahrhundert)
