= Andrzej Koszewski =

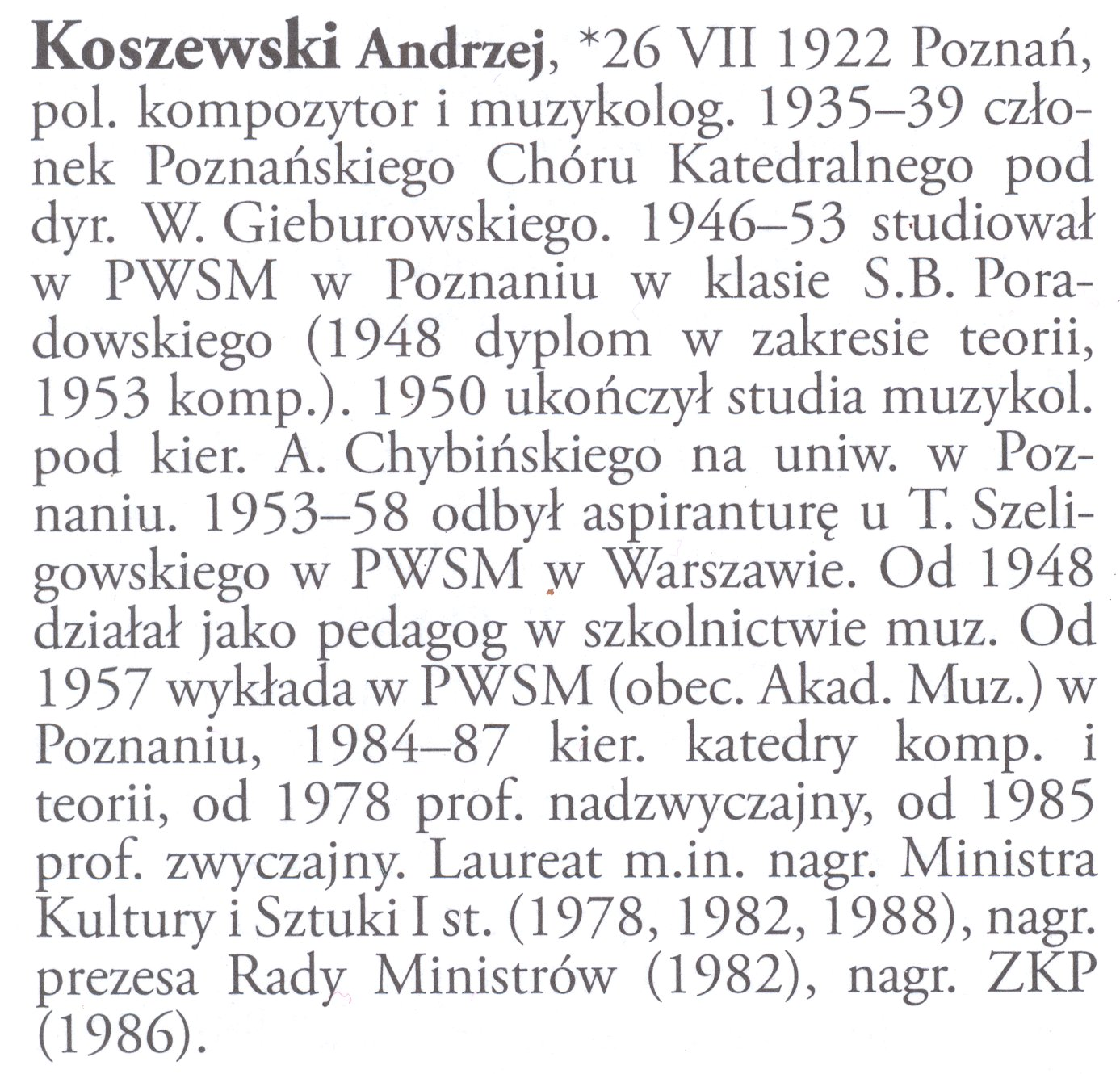
Polskie Wydawnictwo Muzyczne granted permission to use from the Encyklopedia Muzyczna PWM ISBN 83-224-0112-4 some biographies, including that. The consent applies only to resume.

Andrzej Koszewski (Poznań, 26 July 1922 – 17 February 2015) was a Polish composer, musicologist and teacher. His students included Lidia Zielińska, Krzesimir Dębski and Bettina Skrzypczak.
