= Bettina Skrzypczak =

Polish/Swiss composer (born 1963)

Bettina Skrzypczak (born 25 January 1963) is a Polish/Swiss composer.

== Biography ==
Skrzypczak was born in Poznań, Poland. She studied piano at Bydgoszcz and music at the Academy of Music in Poznan. In 1985 she graduated with a degree in music theory, and in 1988 with a degree in composition, studying with Andrzej Koszewski. From 1984-88 she studied with Witold Lutoslawski, Luigi Nono, Henri Pousseur, and Iannis Xenakis in composition courses organised in Kazimierz by the Polish section of the ISCM. In 1988 she studied electronic music with Thomas Kessler and composition with Rudolf Kelterborn in Basel, Switzerland. She also studied musicology with Jürg Stenzl and complementary studies in cultural philosophy with Hans Saner in Fribourg. In 1990 she studied computer music with Klarenz Barlow in Cologne. In 1999 she received a doctorate degree from the Academy of Music in Kraków.

In 2002 Skrzypczak took a position as a professor at the Music University Lucerne. She also served as a guest lecturer at schools and universities including the International Courses of New Music in Darmstadt in 2004, the European Chamber Music Academy, Hannover, and Hochschule für Musik und Theater, Munich.

Skrzypczak founded and served as artistic director of the Swiss "Ensemble Boswil" promoting young artists with annual workshops in Boswil followed by concert tours. Her works have been performed internationally. She is the author of radio programs and journal articles on contemporary and Polish music. She resides in Riehen/Switzerland.

== Honors and awards ==
- 1989 Prize, Zagreb Music Biennale's competition for young composers
- 1990 Prize, Tadeusz Baird Competition, Warsaw
- 1992 Honorable mention, "Tribune internationale des compositeurs", Paris
- 1994 Prize, 10th International Competition for Women Composers, Mannheim
- 1996 Cultural Recognition Prize, City of Basle
- 2001 Composition Grant, Canton and City of Lucerne
- 2004 Cultural Prize of the City of Riehen
- 2008 Composition Grant, Canton and City of Lucerne

== Works ==
Selected works include:

- ABC (1986) for tape
- Acaso (1994) for choir, clarinet, cello and percussion, Text: Stéphane Mallarmé, Jorge Luis Borges, Nikolaus Kopernikus, Rainer Maria Rilke, trad. (Maori)
- Amoureske (2003) for viola d'amore
- Anomalia Lunae media (2007) for soprano, baritone and instruments, Text: Leonhard Euler, Boethius, Leonardo da Vinci, Jorge Luis Borges
- Arcato (2000) for Viola solo
- Aria (2004) for 2 bass saxophones
- Caleidoscopio (1992) for string ensemble
- Cercar (2001) for prepared guitar solo
- Concerto for Piano and Orchestra (1998)
- Concerto for Oboe and Orchestra (1995/96)
- Daphnes Lied (Daphne's Song) (2002) for piano solo
- Fantasie (1997) for oboe solo
- Flash (2007) for percussion solo
- Illuminationen (Illuminations) (2008) for clarinet, cello and piano
- In un soffio (2003) for wind quintet
- Initial (2005) for orchestra
- Landschaft des Augenblicks (1992) Five Songs for mezzo-soprano, viola and piano, Text: Czeslaw Milosz, Kazimiera Illakowiczówna, Leopold Staff, Maria Pawlikowska-Jasnorzewska
- Lettres (2004) for soprano, clarinet and cello Text: Guillaume de Machaut
- Mazurka (2000) for accordion solo
- Miroirs (2000) for mezzo-soprano and ensemble, Texts: J. L. Borges, Li Tai-bo, Bernart de Ventadorn und Satchal Sarmas
- Mouvement (1999) for flute solo
- Nonet for Wind Instruments and Double Bass (1994)
- Notturno (1992) for flute solo
- Phototaxis (2003) for string orchestra
- Scène (2001) for violin and cello
- String Quartet nr. 2 (1991)
- String Quartet nr. 3 (1993)
- String Quartet nr. 4 (2003)
- Toccata sospesa (1999) for flute und 2 percussionists
- Trio (1990) for 3 percussionists
- Variabile (1991) for orchestra
- Verba (1987) for orchestra
- Vier Figuren (2001) for ensemble (18 players) in 3 groups
- Weissagung (Prophecy) (2003) composed improvisation for the "quartet noir"
- What Is Black, What Is White (1987) for 2 percussionists
