= Lidia Zielińska =

Polish composer and music educator (born 1953)

Lidia Zielińska (born 9 October 1953) is a Polish composer and music educator.

== Biography ==
Lidia Zielińska was born in Poznań, Poland. She graduated from the State Higher School of Music in Poznań in 1979 after studying composition under Andrzej Koszewski. She also studied composition and electronic music in Poland and at 'Musicultura' in Breukelen, the M. Deutsch Symphonic Workshop in Paris, IRCAM courses in Kraków and the Polish Society for Contemporary Music courses in Rydzyna and Wzdów.

Zielińska took a position as professor of composition at the Poznań Academy of Music, and worked as a violinist in the Poznań Philharmonic Orchestra and the Agnieszka Duczmal Chamber Orchestra. She also taught at the State Higher School of Visual Arts, Wrocław Academy of Music, and was a guest lecturer for summer courses in Poland, France, the Netherlands, Germany, Switzerland, Sweden, Belarus and Moldova.

Zielińska received a number of prizes for her compositions in Poland, Yugoslavia, Germany, Switzerland and France. In 1993/94, she worked with the EuroMusicTheater project, and in 1994/95 was part of the Donau Ballet project. In 1995/96 she was the composer-in-residence at the Electronic Music Studio in Stockholm. She has also worked with the Eighth Day Theatre with Izabella Gustowska, Jan Berdyszak and Aleksandra Korejwo.

From 1982 to 1992, Zielińska was artistic director of the "Poznań Music Spring" festival. She has been a board member of the Polish Society for Contemporary Music, secretary of the Coordination Committee for Creative and Visual Art Circles, a member of the Polish Composers' Union, and a member of the "Warsaw Autumn" repertoire committee. She has been president of the "House of World Rhythms" foundation, and is co-founder of the Brevis music editions and Monochord quarterly.

== Works ==
Zielińska has composed for chamber ensembles, stage, orchestra, voice and solo instrument. She has also composed theatre and film music. Selected works include:

Stage

- Listen, Joe, monodrama for mime, tape and orchestra based on Samuel *Beckett – 1978
- Mrs. Koch, tragicomedy for solo voices, tape recorders, vocal and instrumental ensembles – 1981
- Cascando, for actors and double mixed choir to a text by Samuel *Beckett – 1983/91
- Huit heures de la vie des femmes, musical theatre for 9 performers – 1988
- The Same, performance – 1988
- In the Field, minispectacle – 1990
- Voices, performance – 1992
- Zeitschlingen, sound spectacle – 1994
- Venture Unknown, ballet – 1995

Orchestral

- Violin Concerto – 1979
- Farewell to Toorope for orchestra – 1981
- Epitaph in memoriam Poznan June 1956 for orchestra – 1981
- Fiction for orchestra – 1986
- Little Atrophic Symphony for orchestra – 1988

Chamber music

- Litany for string quartet – 1979
- Minuten – Sonate for optional instrument – 1981
- Two Dances for strings – 1981
- Treaty for oboe quartet – 1982
- Sonnet on the Tatras for 5 musicians – 1985
- Pleonasmus for oboe, violin and string orchestra – 1986
- String Quartet – 1988
- Jacquard for 14 musicians – 1991
- La Vetrata for young string orchestra – 1996

Solo instruments

- Gagaku Lullaby for double bass – 1984
- Glossa for violin or viola solo (1986)

Vocal

- Concrete Music for choir and orchestra – 1987
- Music for Holy Week for mixed choir and percussion – 1988
- TOGO Unit for male choir and piano – 1995*

Electroacoustic

- Artificial Cult for tape, video tape, neons and visual objects – 1985

Heldenleben.

- Overheard and Spied on for audio tape, video tape and shadowgraph – 1986
- Polish Dances According to Priest Baka for tape – 1986
- Feature Piece for saxophone and tape – 1987
- Musica humana or How Symphonies Are Born radio piece (Horspiel) – 1989
- Graphic 2 for 10 instruments and live electronics – 1991
- Fago for bassoon, double-bass, accordion and electronic keyboard – 1992
- Short piece for flute and computer or computer and tape – 1992
- Like These White Mice, radio piece – 1996
- Expandata for percussion and tape – 1997

Mixed media

- AKO, cartoon (together with Aleksandra Korejwo) – 1986

Music for children

- Kaleidoscope – Passacaglia for percussion, slides and clapping hands, for children – 1987
- Piece about Everything for percussion and children audience – 1988
- Sound Museum, "live" installation for children – 1988
- Soaked Music, with children audience, narrator, conductor and tape – 1993
