= Trudy Späth-Schweizer =

Swiss politician (1908–1990)

Gertrud "Trudy" Späth-Schweizer (6 December 1908 – 19 October 1990) was the first woman to hold a political office in Switzerland. She was elected to the Bürgerrat, the executive council of the Bürgergemeinde, of Riehen in 1958.

== Biography ==
Gertrud Späth was born as a farmer's and innkeeper's daughter in Riehen. She attended the Frauenarbeitsschule ("Women's Work School") in Basel and was then employed for five years as head of the box office of the City Theater of Basel. After marrying Ernst Schweizer, a master carpenter, in 1932, she remained a housekeeper and assisted her husband in his workshop.

In the summer of 1958, the Bürgergemeinde of Riehen was the first in Switzerland to introduce women's suffrage for local elections and referendums (at the national level, Swiss women would not gain the vote until 1971.) Späth-Schweizer, by then a mother of two and well-regarded in the local community, did not initially intend to enter politics. But when it appeared certain that a female Social Democrat candidate would be elected in the governmental elections in autumn 1958, the conservative Mittelstands- und Gewerbepartei ("Middle Class and Commerce Party") hastily asked Späth-Schweizer to contest the election on their behalf, which she did.

On 29 September 1958, the citizens' assembly of Riehen elected Späth-Schweizer to the Bürgerrat ("citizens' council") with 336 against 210 votes. The apparent irregularities of the vote – more votes were cast than there were people in the room – do not appear to have bothered anybody at the time, and the first election of a Swiss woman to political office was widely reported in the media, including even by the New York Herald Tribune.

Späth-Schweizer served for 16 years on the Bürgerrat. That council was the executive branch of the Bürgergemeinde ("citizens' community"), the public body responsible for issues involving only citizens of Riehen, such as social services. It was independent of the Einwohnergemeinde ("residents' community"), the polity responsible for matters concerning all residents. She was a very popular politician, concerned mainly with social issues, and was often asked for advice by her male colleagues. When asked to speak to Swiss feminists, however, she always refused, because she did not consider herself a feminist.

Trudy Späth-Schweizer died in 1990 in Riehen. In 2008, on her hundredth birthday and 50 years after her election, the municipality of Riehen named an alley after her.
