= Riehen =

- Municipality
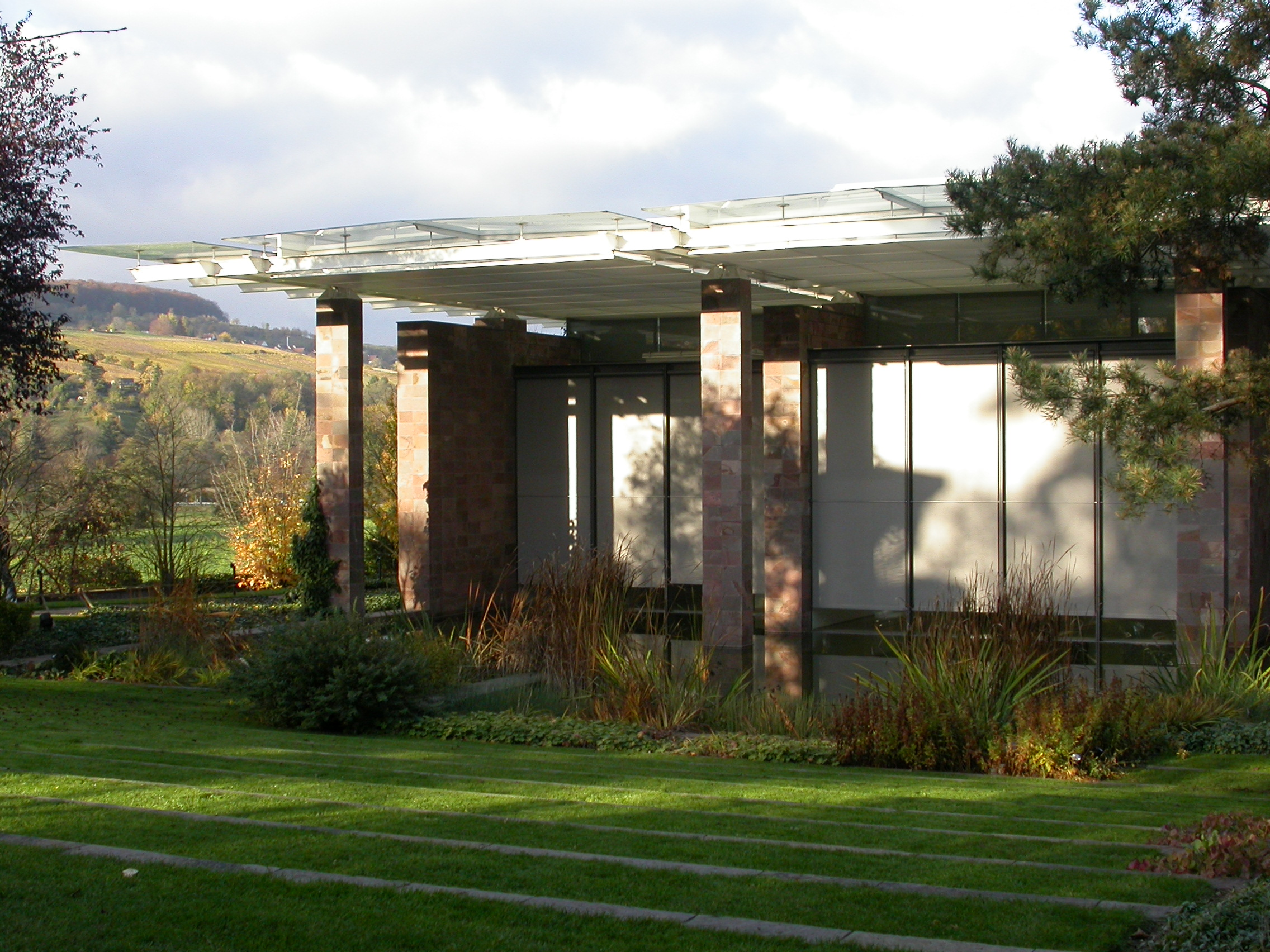
- The Fondation Beyeler by Renzo Piano

- Flag Coat of arms
- Location of Riehen
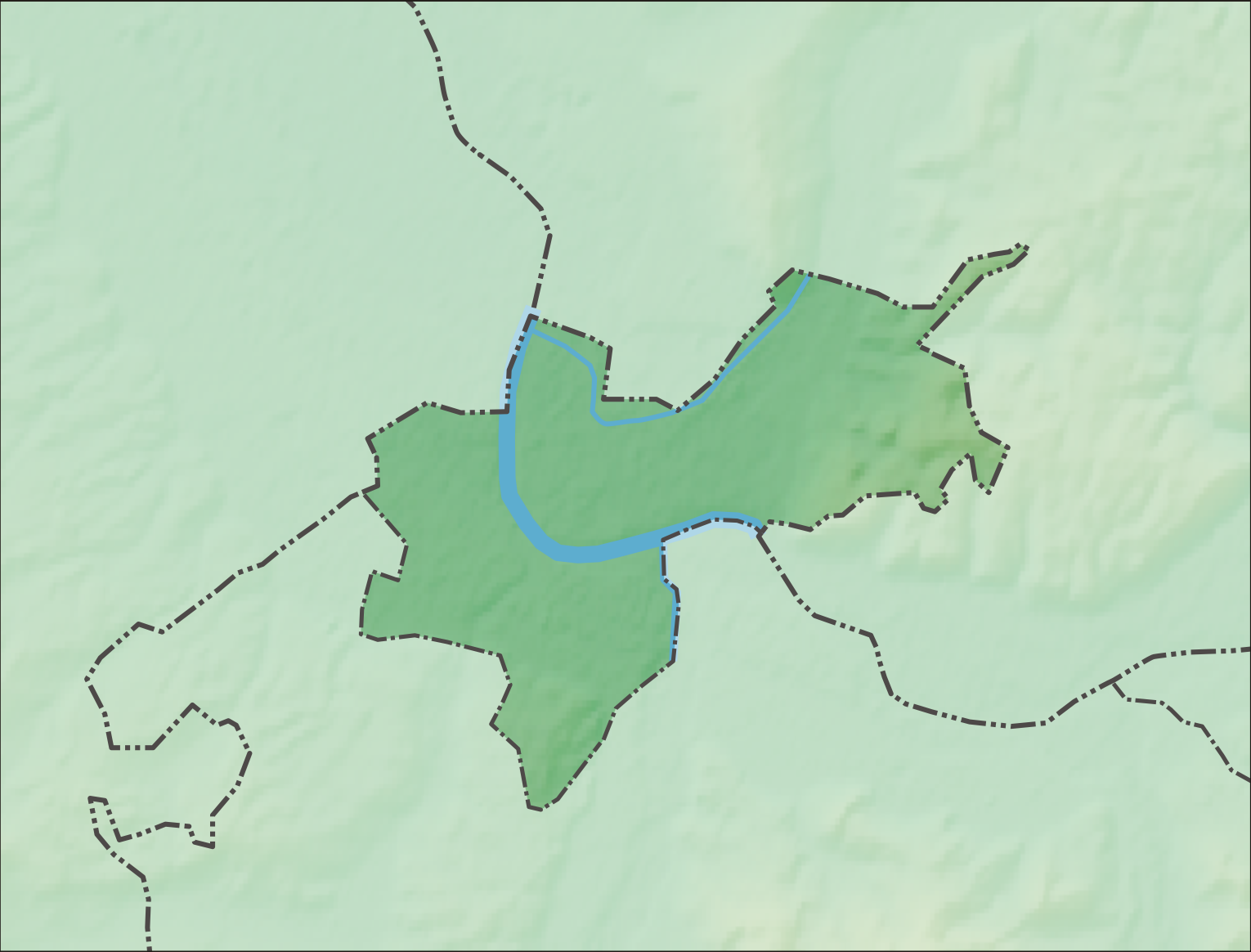
- Location within Switzerland Location within Canton of Basel-Stadt
- Coordinates: 47°34′50″N 7°38′57″E
- Country: Switzerland
- Canton: Basel-Stadt
- District: n.a.

Government
  - Mayor: Hansjörg Wilde

Area
  - Total: 10.86 km^{2} (4.19 sq mi)
- Elevation: 278 m (912 ft)

Population (July 2021)
  - Total: 21,788
  - Density: 2,006/km^{2} (5,196/sq mi)
- Time zone: UTC+01:00 (CET)
  - Summer (DST): UTC+02:00 (CEST)
- Postal code: 4125
- SFOS number: 2703
- ISO 3166 code: CH-BS
- Surrounded by: Basel, Bettingen, Birsfelden (BL), Grenzach-Wyhlen (DE-BW), Inzlingen (DE-BW), Lörrach (DE-BW), Weil am Rhein (DE-BW)
- Twin towns: Miercurea Ciuc(Romania), Mutten (Switzerland)
- Website: www.riehen.ch

Riehen (Swiss Standard German pronunciation: [ˈriːən]; Swiss German: Rieche) is a municipality in the canton of Basel-Stadt in Switzerland. Together with the city of Basel and Bettingen, Riehen is one of three municipalities in the canton.

Riehen hosts the Fondation Beyeler (a privately owned art gallery) as well as a toy museum and several parks. The mathematician Leonhard Euler and the tennis player Roger Federer lived in Riehen during their childhood years.

== History ==
Riehen is first mentioned in 1157 as Rieheim.

Riehen was the first municipality in Switzerland to elect a woman, Trudy Späth-Schweizer to political office, in 1958.

== Coat of arms ==
The blazon of the municipal coat of arms is Azure, six Bricks Argent one, two and three.

== Geography ==
Aerial view (1951)

Riehen has an area, as of 2009, of 10.86 square kilometers (4.19 sq mi). Of this area, 2.78 km^{2} (1.07 sq mi) or 25.6% is used for agricultural purposes, while 2.74 km^{2} (1.06 sq mi) or 25.2% is forested. Of the rest of the land, 5.19 km^{2} (2.00 sq mi) or 47.8% is settled (buildings or roads), 0.23 km^{2} (0.089 sq mi) or 2.1% is either rivers or lakes.

Of the built up area, housing and buildings made up 28.0% and transportation infrastructure made up 7.7%. while parks, green belts and sports fields made up 11.3%. Out of the forested land, 23.8% of the total land area is heavily forested and 1.4% is covered with orchards or small clusters of trees. Of the agricultural land, 14.2% is used for growing crops and 7.3% is pastures, while 4.1% is used for orchards or vine crops. Of the water in the municipality, 0.2% is in lakes and 1.9% is in rivers and streams.

The municipality is located on the right bank of the Rhine on the Swiss-German border between Wiese and the Chrischonahügel. A salient around 2 km in length protrudes from the northeast, over the Herrenwald forest.

Riehen is bounded by three different municipalities in Switzerland (Basel, Bettingen and Birsfelden) and four in Germany (Weil am Rhein, Lörrach, Inzlingen and Grenzach-Wyhlen).

== Demographics ==
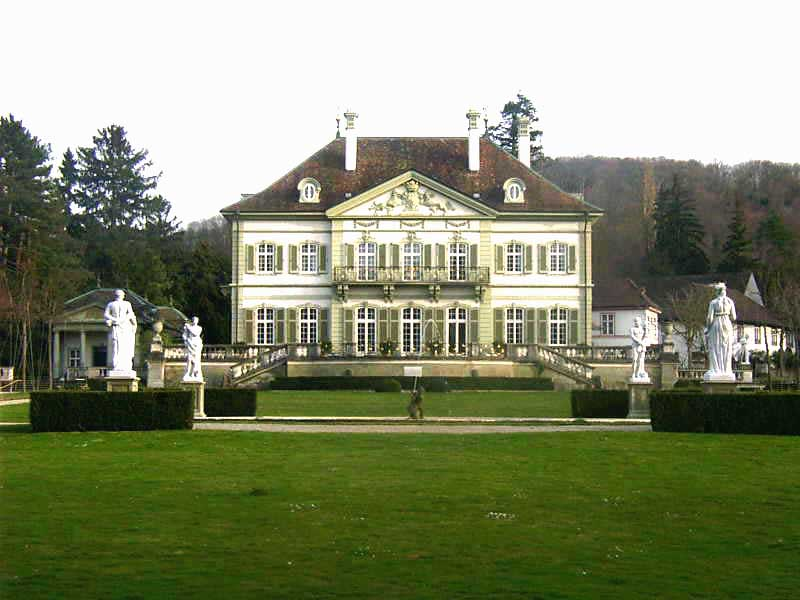
New Wenkenhof with its French formal garden designed by André Le Nôtre

Riehen has a population (as of July 2021) of 21,788. As of 2008, 18.3% of the population are resident foreign nationals. Over the last 10 years (1999–2009 ) the population has changed at a rate of -0.2%. It has changed at a rate of 4.9% due to migration and at a rate of -4.9% due to births and deaths.

Most of the population (as of 2000) speaks German (18,509 or 90.9%), with French being second most common (365 or 1.8%) and Italian being third (355 or 1.7%). There are 29 people who speak Romansh.

Of the population in the municipality 4,549 or about 22.3% were born in Riehen and lived there in 2000. There were 4,939 or 24.2% who were born in the same canton, while 5,700 or 28.0% were born somewhere else in Switzerland, and 4,420 or 21.7% were born outside of Switzerland.

In 2008 there were 94 live births to Swiss citizens and 33 births to non-Swiss citizens, and in same time span there were 226 deaths of Swiss citizens and 5 non-Swiss citizen deaths. Ignoring immigration and emigration, the population of Swiss citizens decreased by 132 while the foreign population increased by 28. There were 4 Swiss men who emigrated from Switzerland and 22 Swiss women who immigrated back to Switzerland. At the same time, there were 73 non-Swiss men and 41 non-Swiss women who immigrated from another country to Switzerland. The total Swiss population change in 2008 (from all sources, including moves across municipal borders) was a decrease of 95 and the non-Swiss population increased by 117 people. This represents a population growth rate of 0.1%.

As of 2000, there were 7,169 people who were single and never married in the municipality. There were 10,466 married individuals, 1,621 widows or widowers and 1,114 individuals who are divorced.

As of 2000, there were 9,201 private households in the municipality, and an average of 2.1 persons per household. There were 3,248 households that consist of only one person and 409 households with five or more people. Out of a total of 9,315 households that answered this question, 34.9% were households made up of just one person and there were 82 adults who lived with their parents. Of the rest of the households, there are 3,073 married couples without children, 2,232 married couples with children There were 468 single parents with a child or children. There were 98 households that were made up of unrelated people and 114 households that were made up of some sort of institution or another collective housing.

In 2000 there were 2,460 single-family homes (or 63.2% of the total) out of a total of 3,894 inhabited buildings. There were 999 multi-family buildings (25.7%), along with 337 multi-purpose buildings that were mostly used for housing (8.7%) and 98 other use buildings (commercial or industrial) that also had some housing (2.5%). Of the single-family homes 124 were built before 1919, while 206 were built between 1990 and 2000. The greatest number of single-family homes (852) were built between 1946 and 1960.

In 2000 there were 9,740 apartments in the municipality. The most common apartment size was 3 rooms of which there were 2,998. There were 353 single-room apartments and 2,649 apartments with five or more rooms. Of these apartments, a total of 9,063 apartments (93.0% of the total) were permanently occupied, while 453 apartments (4.7%) were seasonally occupied and 224 apartments (2.3%) were empty. As of 2009, the construction rate of new housing units was 2.1 new units per 1000 residents. The vacancy rate for the municipality, in 2010, was 0.52%.

The historical population is given in the following chart:

== Heritage sites of national significance ==
The Beyeler Foundation, the Cemetery am Hörnli with crematorium, the New and Old Wenkenhof with Park, the Reformed Village Church of St Martin with Meierhof and ring wall, the Wettsteinhäuser (Toy Museum and Village Museum), the Colnaghi House, Huber House and Schaeffer-von Déchend House are listed as Swiss heritage site of national significance. The entire town of Riehen is part of the Inventory of Swiss Heritage Sites.

== Gallery ==
Town centre

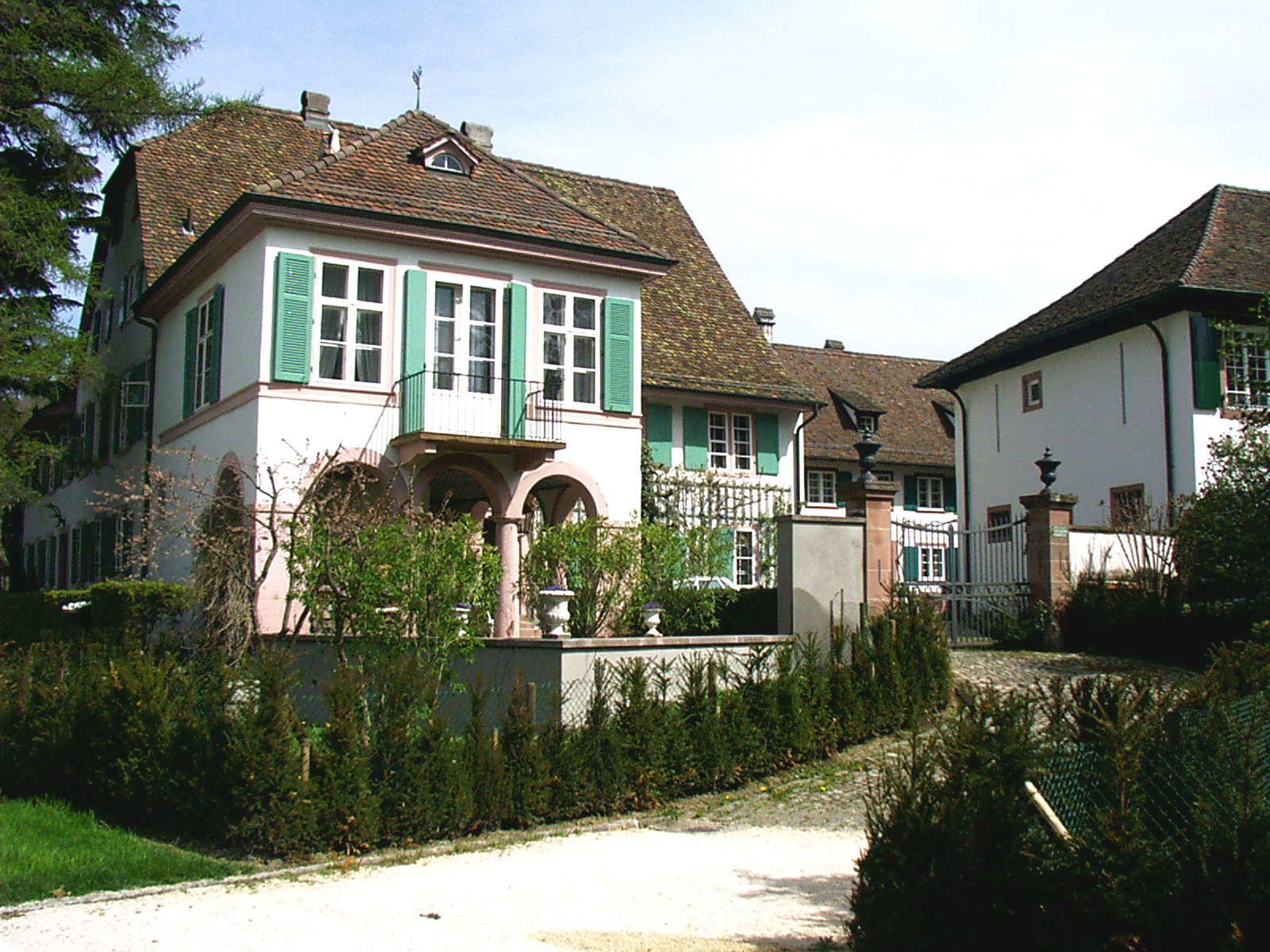
Old Wenkenhof

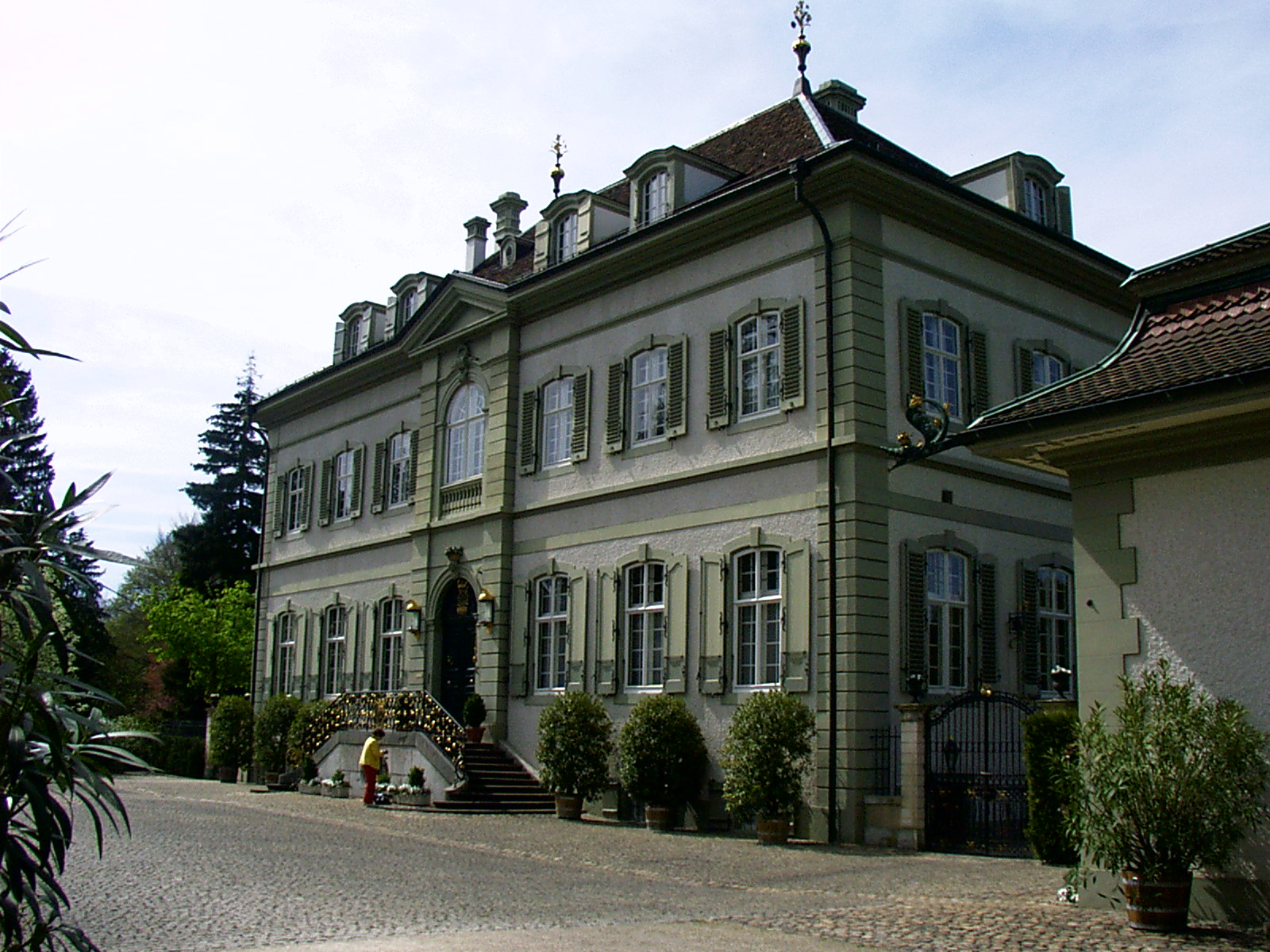
New Wenkenhof

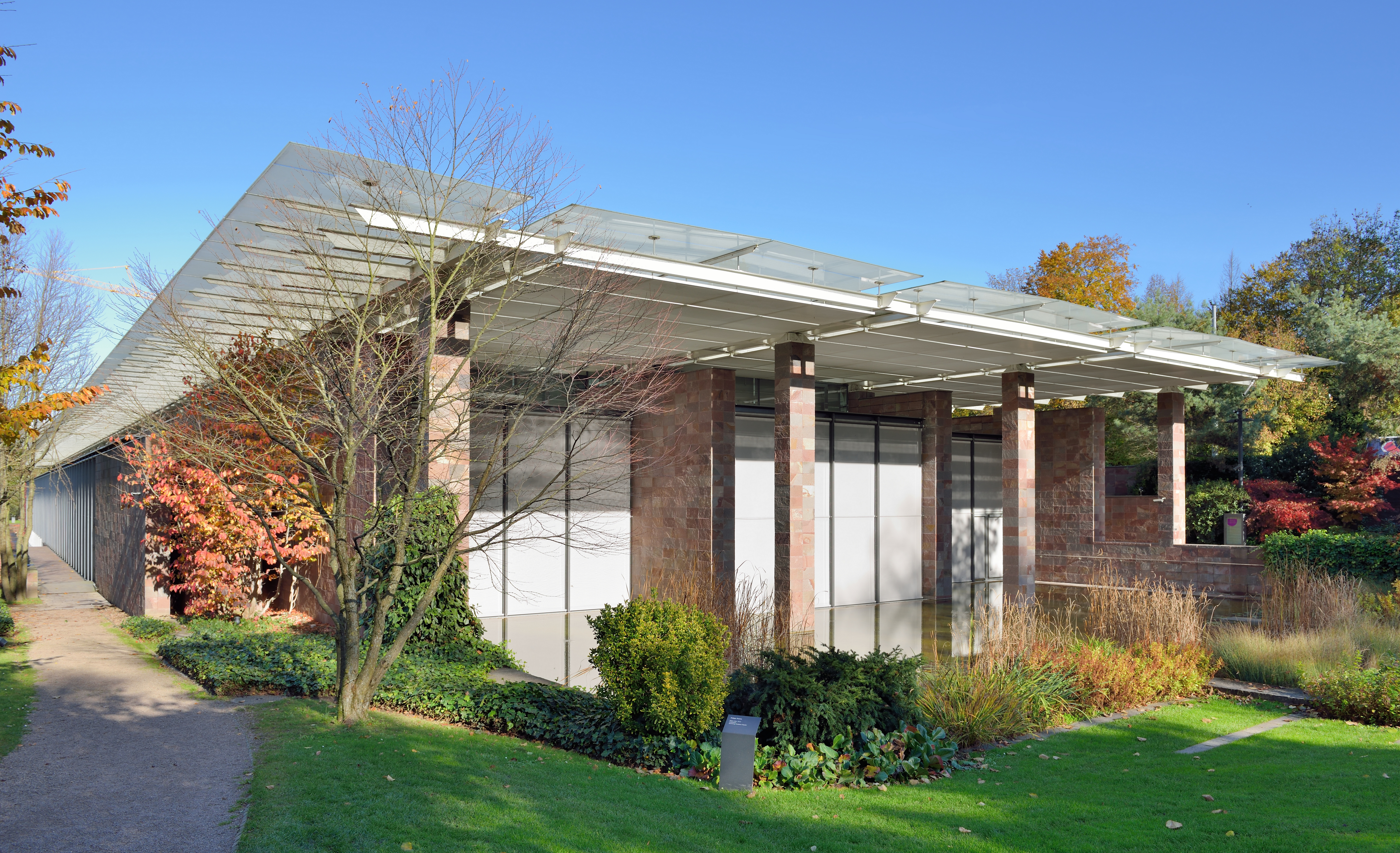
Fondation Beyeler (1997, by Renzo Piano)

New Wettstein House

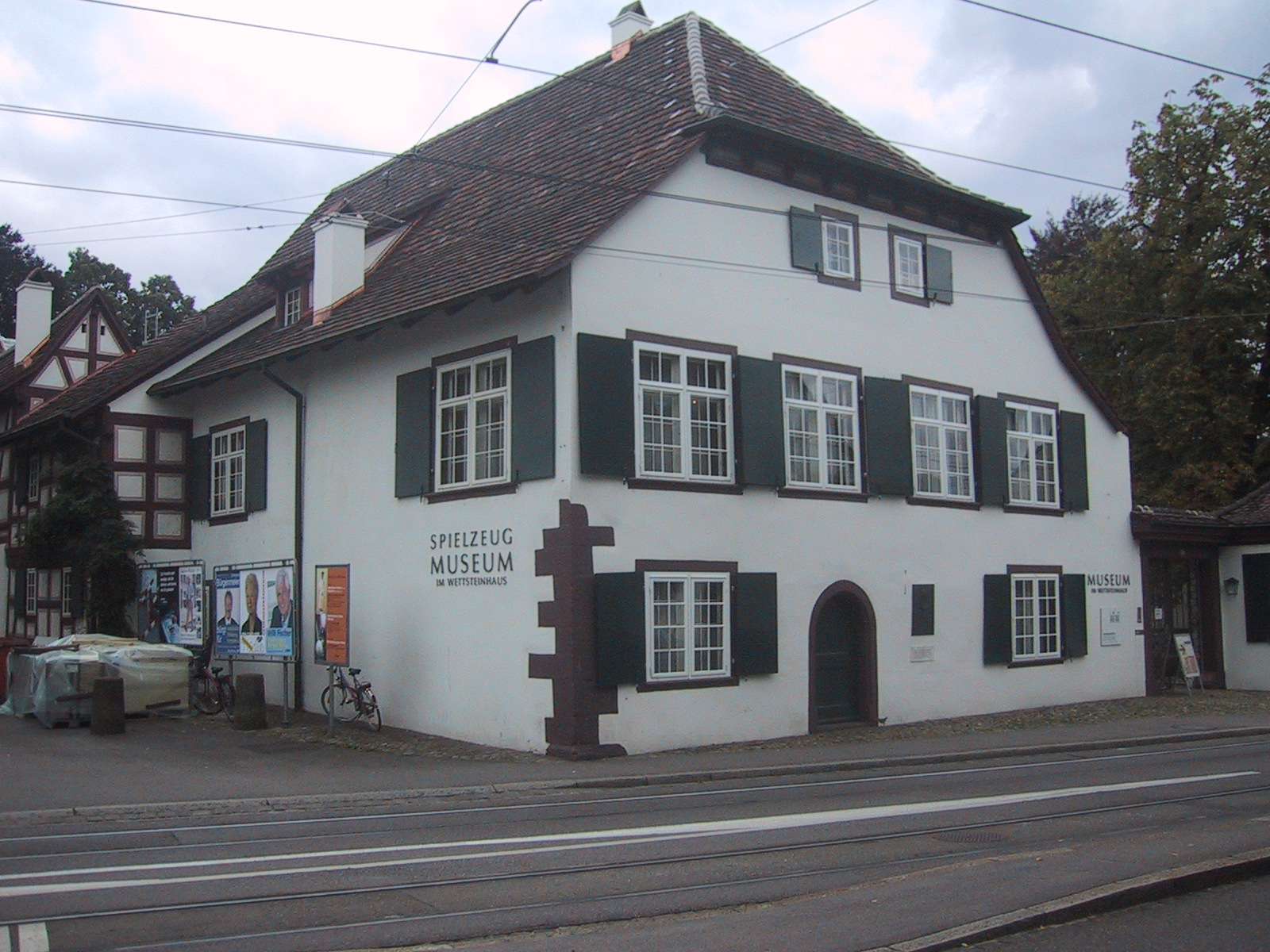
Toy Museum

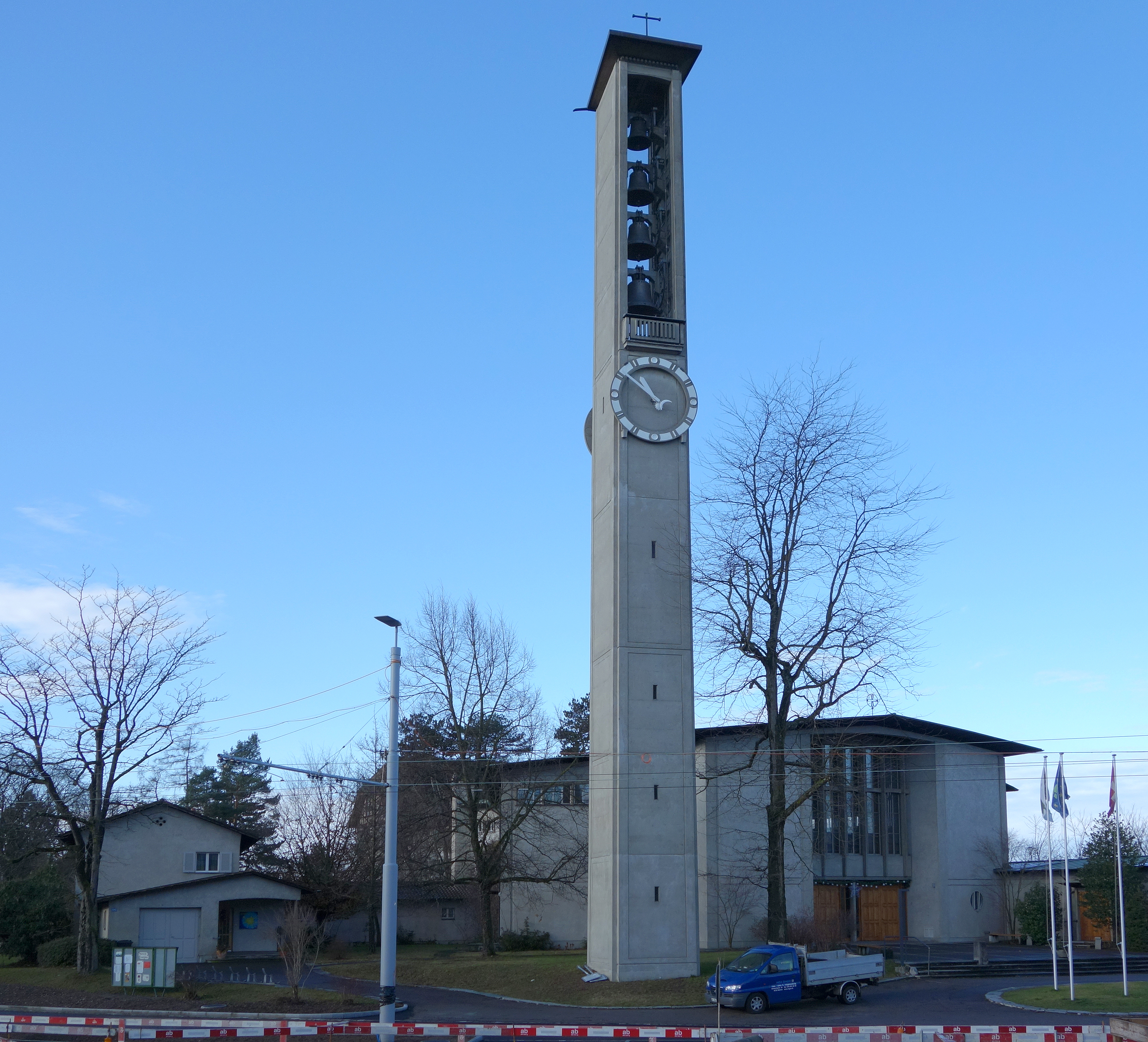
Franziskus Church (1950, by Fritz Metzger)

== Politics ==
In the 2007 federal election the most popular party was the SP which received 24.29% of the vote. The next three most popular parties were the SVP (21.11%), the LPS Party (14.32%) and the FDP (13.19%). In the federal election, a total of 8,209 votes were cast, and the voter turnout was 58.6%.

== Economy ==
As of 2010, Riehen had an unemployment rate of 2.1%. As of 2008, there were 33 people employed in the primary economic sector and about 11 businesses involved in this sector. 552 people were employed in the secondary sector and there were 88 businesses in this sector. 3,392 people were employed in the tertiary sector, with 506 businesses in this sector. There were 8,930 residents of the municipality who were employed in some capacity, of which females made up 45.2% of the workforce.

In 2008 the total number of full-time equivalent jobs was 3,120. The number of jobs in the primary sector was 22, of which 15 were in agriculture and 7 were in forestry or lumber production. The number of jobs in the secondary sector was 514 of which 134 or (26.1%) were in manufacturing and 363 (70.6%) were in construction. The number of jobs in the tertiary sector was 2,584. In the tertiary sector; 388 or 15.0% were in wholesale or retail sales or the repair of motor vehicles, 115 or 4.5% were in the movement and storage of goods, 152 or 5.9% were in a hotel or restaurant, 60 or 2.3% were in the information industry, 79 or 3.1% were the insurance or financial industry, 190 or 7.4% were technical professionals or scientists, 366 or 14.2% were in education and 713 or 27.6% were in health care.

In 2000, there were 3,207 workers who commuted into the municipality and 6,673 workers who commuted away. The municipality is a net exporter of workers, with about 2.1 workers leaving the municipality for every one entering. About 21.0% of the workforce coming into Riehen are coming from outside Switzerland, while 1.1% of the locals commute out of Switzerland for work. Of the working population, 41.7% used public transportation to get to work, and 31.4% used a private car.

== Religion ==
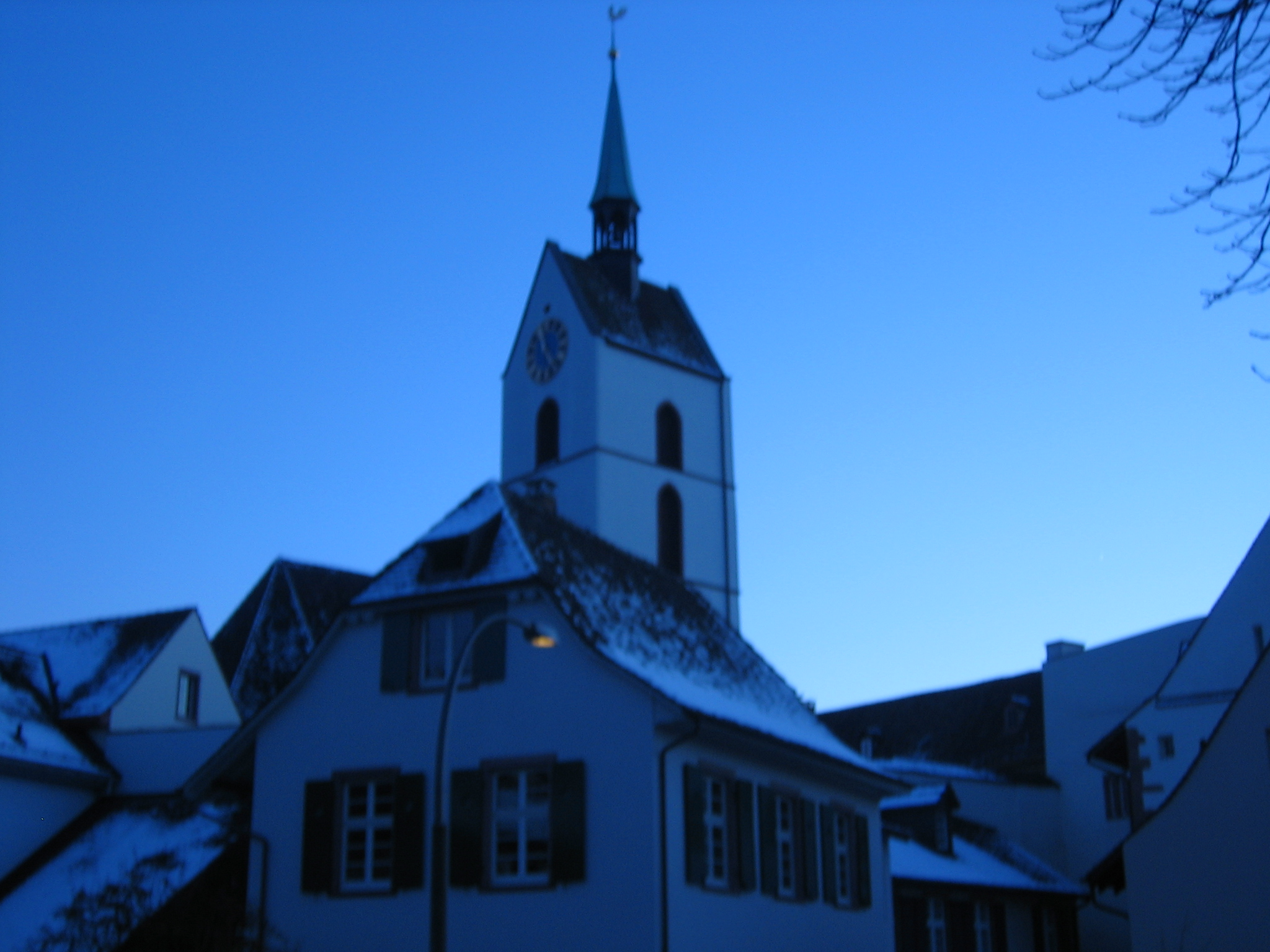
Church in Riehen

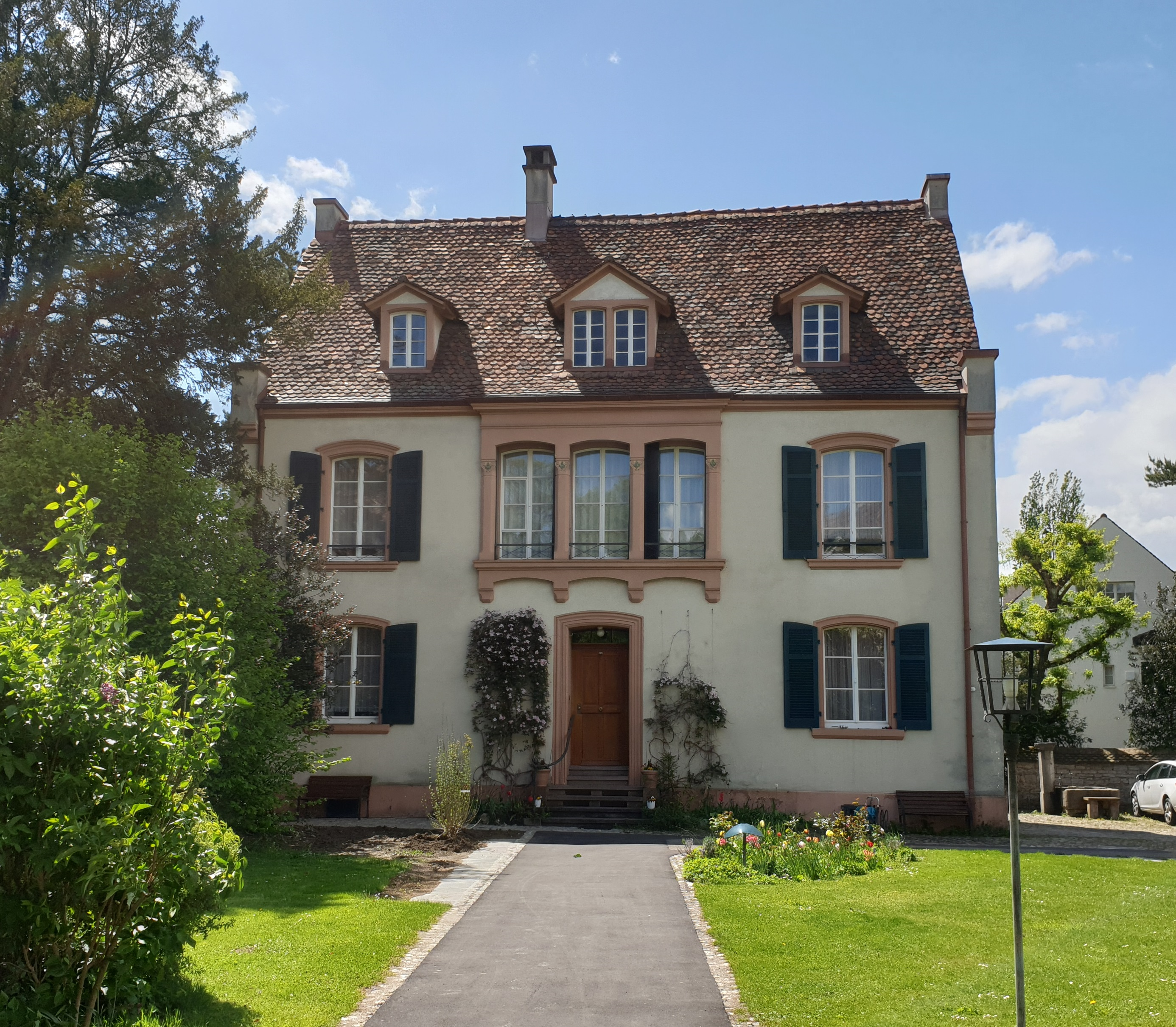
Parish house in Riehen where the famous mathematician Leonhard Euler (1707–1783) grew up

From the 2000 census, 4,683 or 23.0% were Roman Catholic, while 7,464 or 36.6% belonged to the Swiss Reformed Church. Of the rest of the population, there were 213 members of an Orthodox church (or about 1.05% of the population), there were 56 individuals (or about 0.27% of the population) who belonged to the Christian Catholic Church, and there were 1,030 individuals (or about 5.06% of the population) who belonged to another Christian church. There were 95 individuals (or about 0.47% of the population) who were Jewish, and 272 (or about 1.34% of the population) who were Islamic. There were 53 individuals who were Buddhist, 48 individuals who were Hindu and 36 individuals who belonged to another church. 5,731 (or about 28.13% of the population) belonged to no church, are agnostic or atheist, and 689 individuals (or about 3.38% of the population) did not answer the question.

== Climate ==
Riehen has an average of 123.3 days of rain or snow per year and on average receives 763 mm (30.0 in) of precipitation. The wettest month is June during which time Riehen receives an average of 88 mm (3.5 in) of rain or snow. During this month there is precipitation for an average of 11.6 days. The month with the most days of precipitation is May, with an average of 12.7, but with only 86 mm (3.4 in) of rain or snow. The driest month of the year is March with an average of 49 mm (1.9 in) of precipitation over 10.7 days.

== Education ==
In Riehen about 8,191 or (40.2%) of the population have completed non-mandatory upper secondary education, and 4,205 or (20.6%) have completed additional higher education (either university or a Fachhochschule). Of the 4,205 who completed tertiary schooling, 53.5% were Swiss men, 29.0% were Swiss women, 10.2% were non-Swiss men and 7.3% were non-Swiss women.

As of 2000, there were 310 students in Riehen who came from another municipality, while 1,280 residents attended schools outside the municipality.

Riehen is home to the Gemeindebibliothek Riehen (municipal library of Riehen). The library has (as of 2008) 37,413 books or other media, and loaned out 149,733 items in the same year. It was open a total of 310 days with average of 24 hours per week during that year.

== Transport ==
The municipality has two railway stations, Riehen and Riehen Niederholz, with frequent service to Basel. In addition, the Basel tram network runs through the municipality to the German border.

== Notable people ==
Count Emanuel Burckhardt (1744-1820), commander-in-chief of the troops of the Kingdom of Sicily

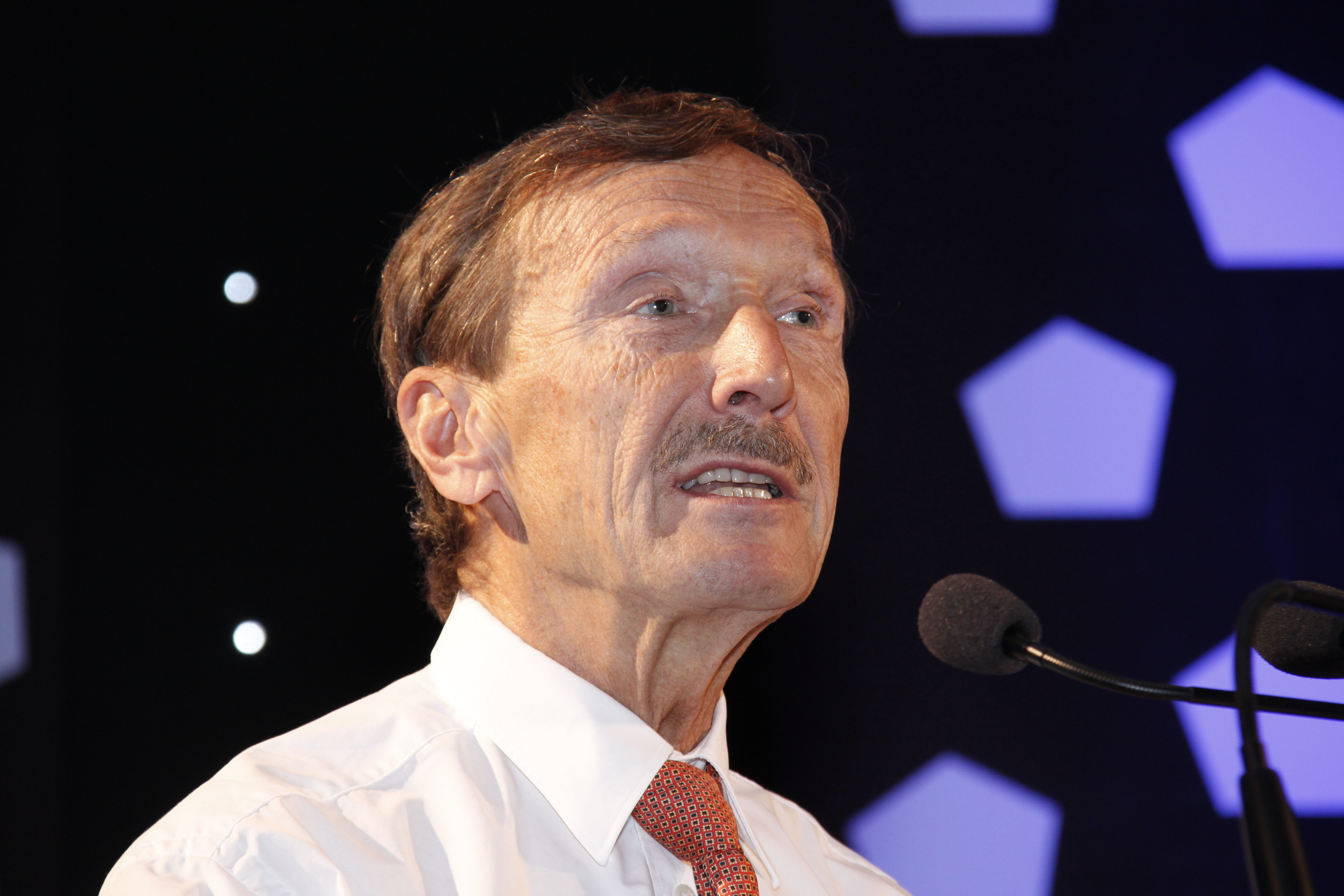
Dr. Rolf Zinkernagel, Nobel Prize winner in Medicine in 1996

- Leonhard Euler (1707–1783), mathematician, grew up in Riehen
- Count Emanuel Burckhardt (1744–1820), born and grew up in Riehen, commander-in-chief of the troops of the Kingdom of Sicily
- Pauline Fatme (c.1831–1855), East African Protestant missionary, buried at Riehen
- Leopold Courvoisier (1873–1955), astronomer, chief observer at the Babelsberg observatory 1905–1938
- Trudy Späth-Schweizer (1908–1990) in 1958 became the first woman to hold a political office in Switzerland
- Albert Scherrer (1908–1986), a racing driver
- Ernst Ehrlich (1921–2007), German-born Swiss Jewish religious philosopher
- Josef Hügi (1930–1995), international footballer, 322 club caps and 34 for Switzerland
- Marcel Kunz (1943–2017), a football goalkeeper
- Rolf M. Zinkernagel (born 1944), Professor of Experimental Immunology at the University of Zurich, awarded the Nobel Prize in Physiology or Medicine in 1996
- Bettina Skrzypczak (born 1962), a Polish composer, won the 2004 Cultural Prize of the City of Riehen
- Gianna Hablützel-Bürki (born 1969), a female épée fencer
- Roger Federer (born 1981), professional tennis player, lived in Riehen until the age of 10.
- Beat Jans (born 1964), member of the federal council since 2023, grew up in Riehen
