= Fritz Metzger =

Swiss church architect (1898–1973)

- Born: 3 July 1898; Winterthur, Switzerland
- Died: 13 August 1973 (aged 75); Zurich, Switzerland
- Education: ETH Zurich
- Occupation: Architect
- Known for: Catholic church architecture

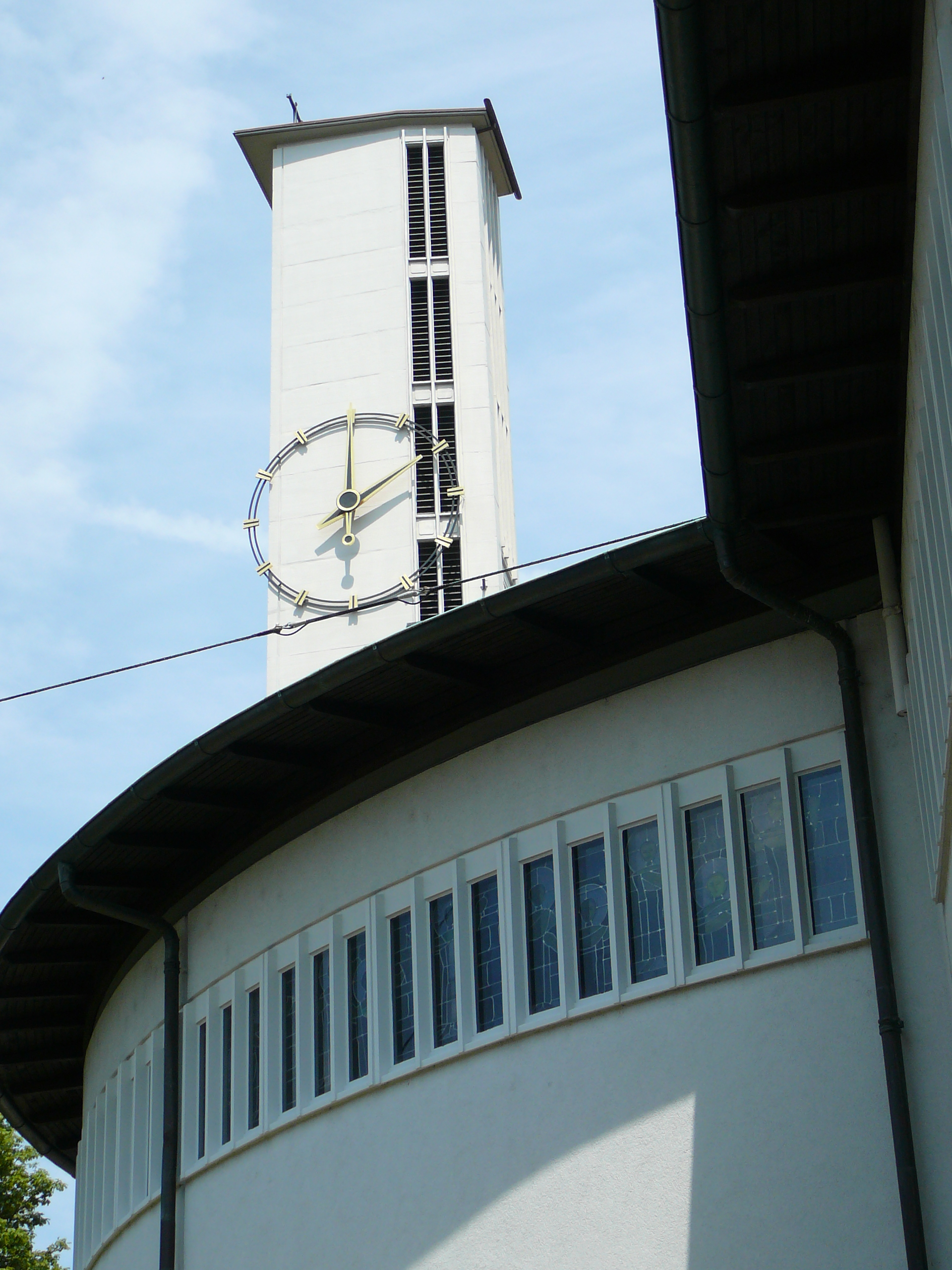
St. Felix and Regula Church, Zurich (1949–1950)

Fritz Metzger (3 July 1898 – 13 August 1973) was a Swiss architect known for his Catholic church architecture. He was regarded as one of Europe's leading church architects of the 20th century, and more than twenty churches were built to his designs between 1928 and 1968. His postwar churches St. Franziskus in Riehen and St. Felix and Regula in Zurich attracted international attention and were praised by architectural critics across Europe.

== Biography ==
Fritz Metzger was born on 3 July 1898 in Winterthur. He studied architecture at ETH Zurich, where Karl Moser was among his teachers, and graduated in 1922. During his student years, he also spent extended periods in Paris between 1918 and 1922. He established an architectural practice in Zurich in the mid-1920s. Metzger married Ida Emmy Oberhänsli in 1940.

Metzger belonged to several Swiss professional and cultural organisations, including the Swiss Society of Engineers and Architects, the Federation of Swiss Architects, the Federal Art Commission and the St. Luke Society. He died in Zurich on 13 August 1973.

== Architecture ==
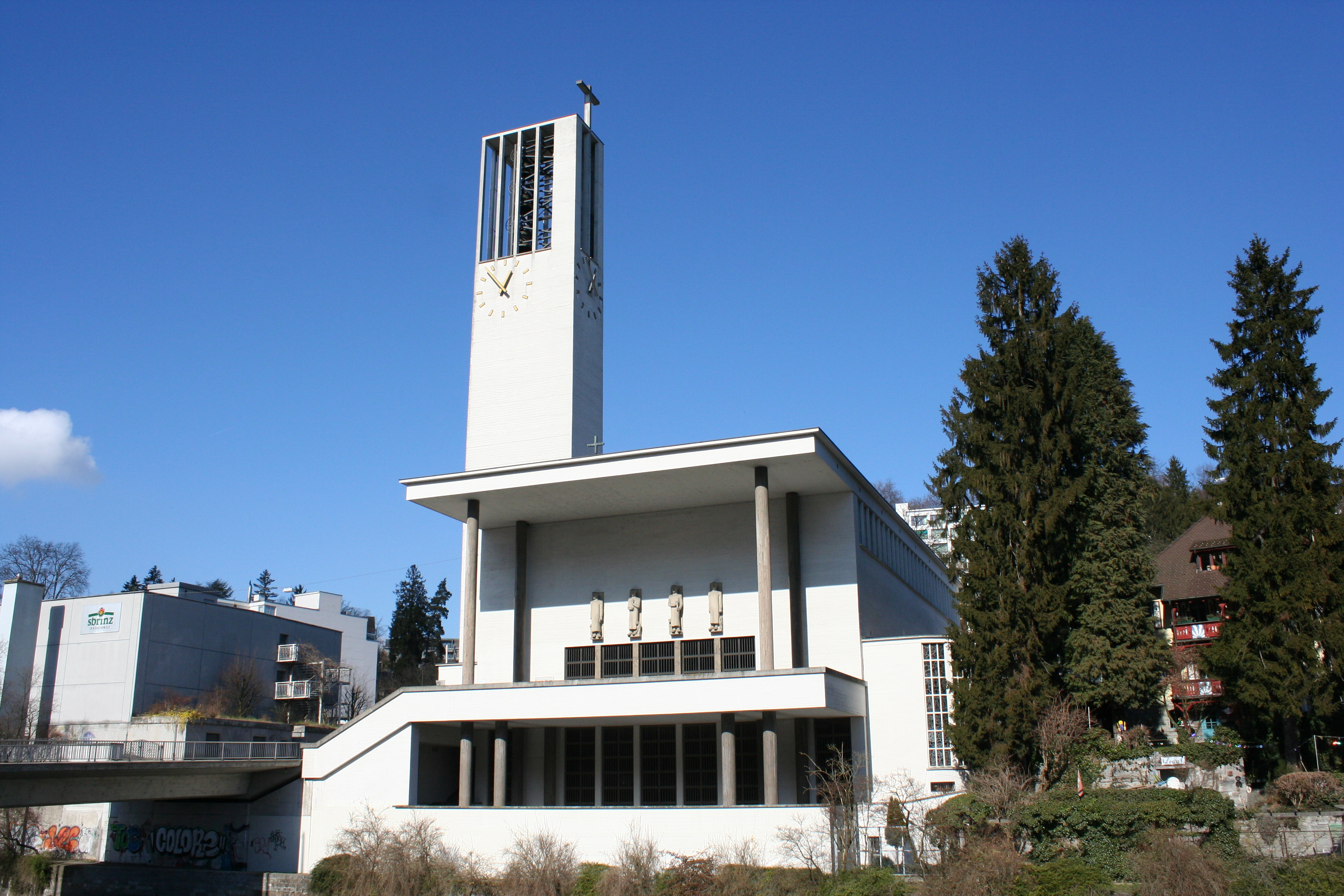
St. Karl Church, Lucerne (1931–1934)

More than twenty Catholic churches based on Metzger's designs were completed between 1928 and 1968. He was regarded as one of Europe's leading church architects of the 20th century.

St. Karl in Lucerne represented a break with earlier Swiss church architecture, combining modern architectural ideas with principles associated with the Liturgical Movement. In early churches such as St. Karl and St. Katharina in Zurich, Metzger incorporated ideas from Neues Bauen into religious architecture and adapted church layouts to liturgical thinking. St. Karl is regarded as a key work of Neues Bauen in Swiss church architecture.

His architectural work was interrupted during the Second World War. In 1945 he returned to church design with St. Franziskus in Riehen. St. Franziskus and St. Felix and Regula attracted international attention and won praise by architectural critics across Europe as advances in Catholic church design. St. Felix and Regula is distinguished by a large oval concrete dome. When the church opened in 1950, its 1.6-metre rise was reported to make it the flattest vault yet built in Switzerland and probably anywhere in the world. In both churches he abandoned the conventional longitudinal plan for a freer arrangement around the altar. Metzger was influenced by the German architect Rudolf Schwarz, who promoted church interiors organised around the gathered congregation.

For Maria Krönung in Gossau, inaugurated in 1959, Metzger designed the church with a floor plan shaped like a fish's belly. Bruder Klaus in Liestal, inaugurated in 1961, was an important work in his career. At St. Pankratius in Oberkirch, built from 1965 to 1967, Metzger adopted a centralised plan that departed from hierarchically organised church interiors. The congregation was arranged on three sides of the altar beneath a cylindrical skylight. Later in the decade, he designed the first section of a new school complex in Oberkirch in 1967 and the Catholic church completed the following year. The two projects formed an urban composition that influenced the buildings that followed.

Metzger's practice also included secular architecture. His works included a residential building and a school in Zurich dating from 1946–1947, as well as an ETH institute building in Zurich completed in 1948. In 1954, he initiated an exhibition devoted to Christian art in Switzerland at the Kunsthaus Zurich.

== Selected works ==
- St. Karl, Lucerne (1931–1934)
- St. Theresia, Zurich-Friesenberg (1933)
- St. Gallus, Oberuzwil (1935)
- Maria Lourdes, Zurich-Seebach (1936)
- Guthirt Church, Zug (1937)
- Maria Himmelfahrt, Schönenwerd (1938)
- ETH institute building, Zurich (1948)
- St. Franziskus, Riehen (1945–1950)
- St. Felix and Regula, Zurich (1949–1950)
- St. Antonius, Obbürgen (1954)
- Maria Krönung, Gossau (1959)
- Bruder Klaus, Liestal (1961)
- St. Mauritius Church, Oberengstringen (1962–1963)
- St. Pankratius, Oberkirch (1967)
- St. Peter and Paul, Allschwil (1966–1967)
- SS. Trinità, Milan (1964–1968)

== Gallery ==
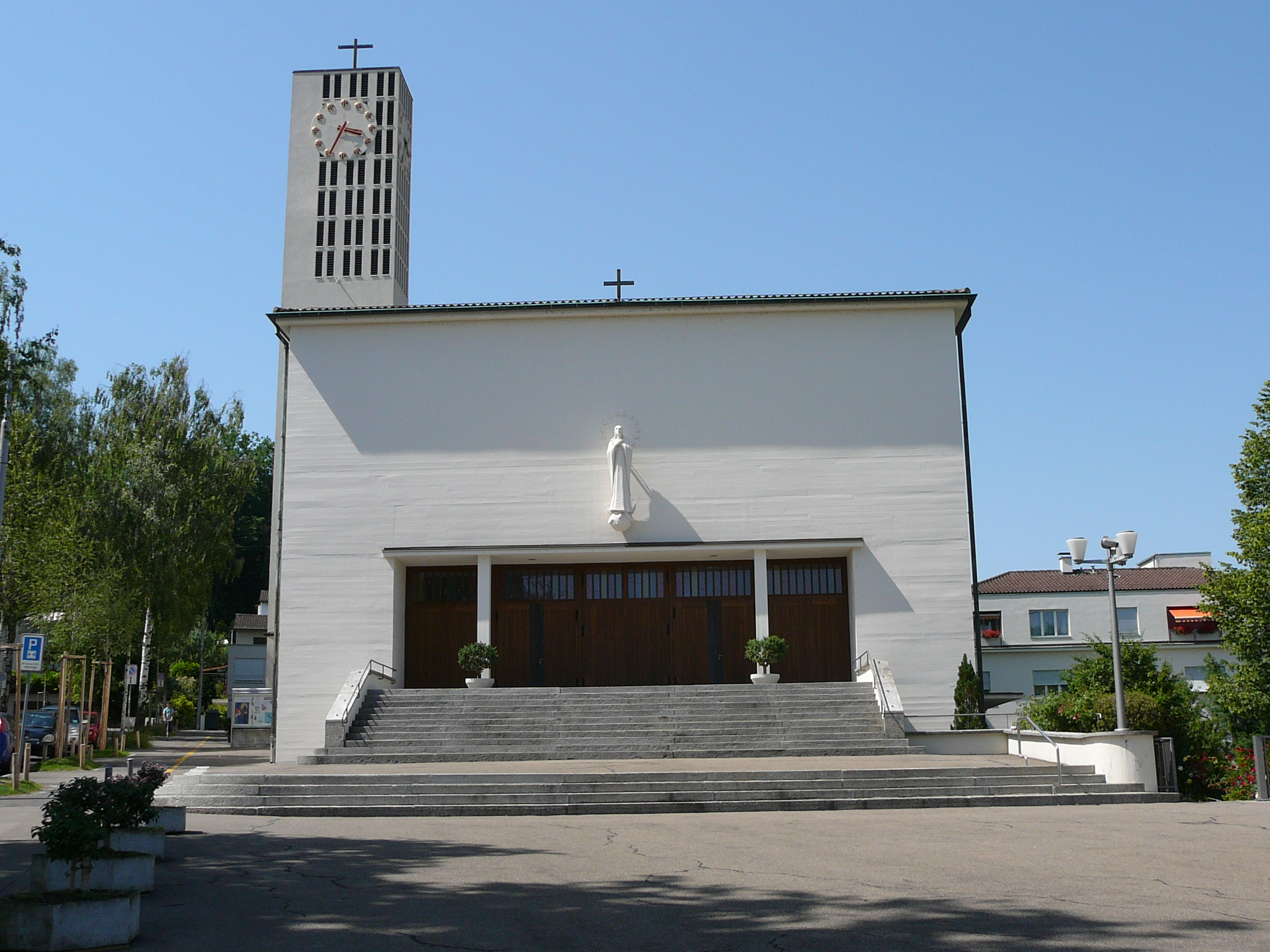
Maria Lourdes Church, Zurich-Seebach (1936)

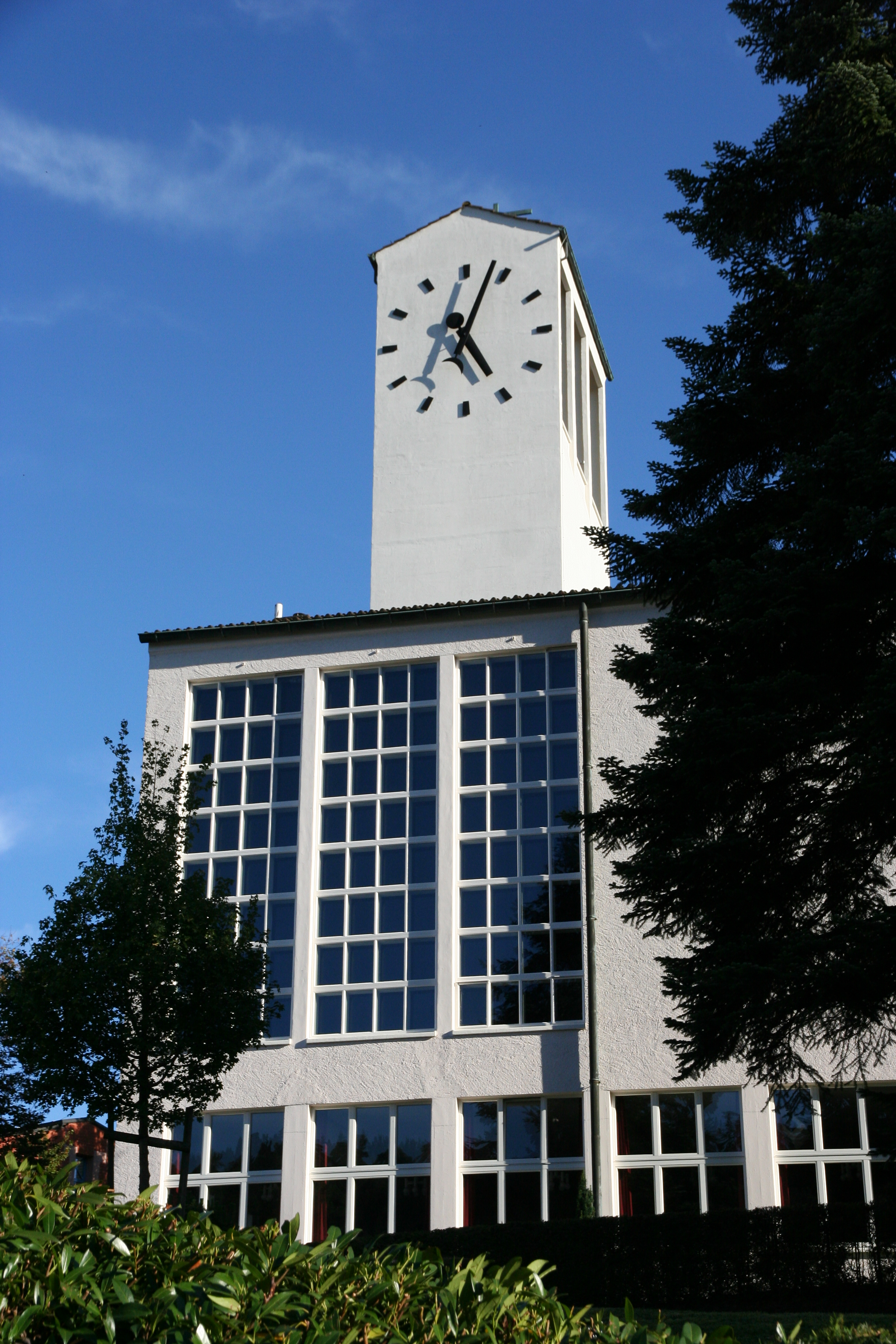
St. Gallus Church, Oberuzwil (1934–1935)

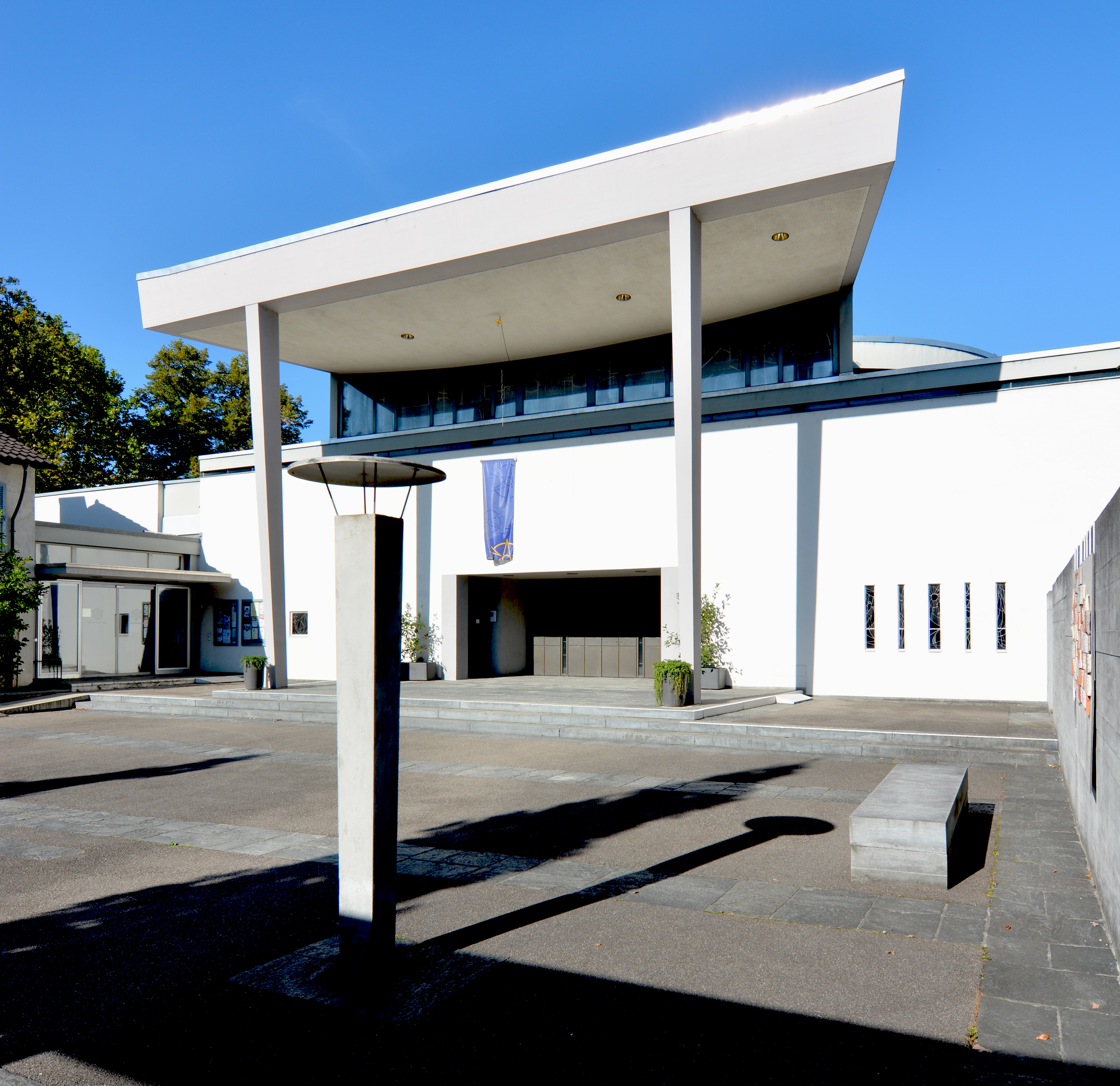
Bruder Klaus Church, Liestal (1961)

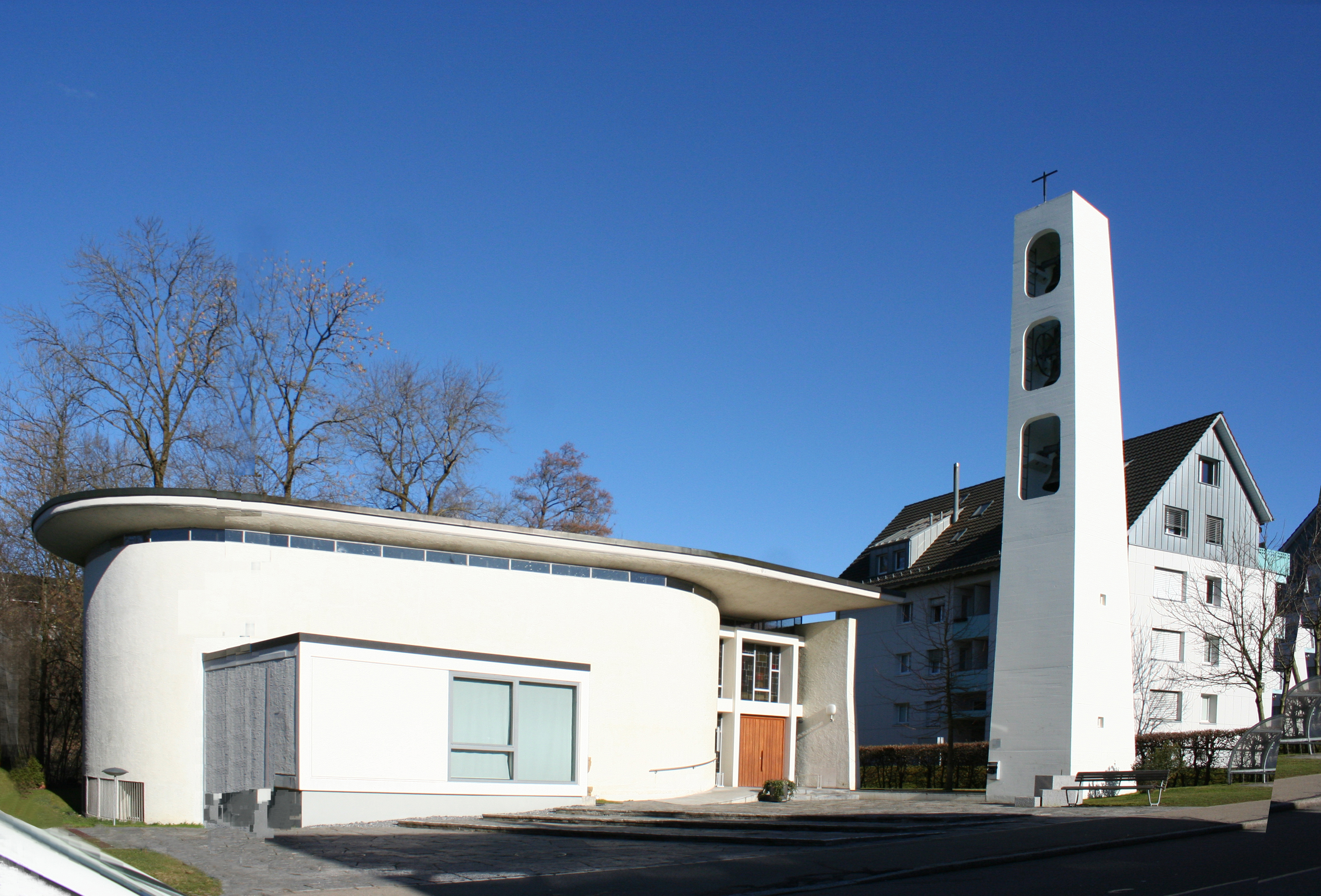
Maria Krönung Church, Gossau (1959)

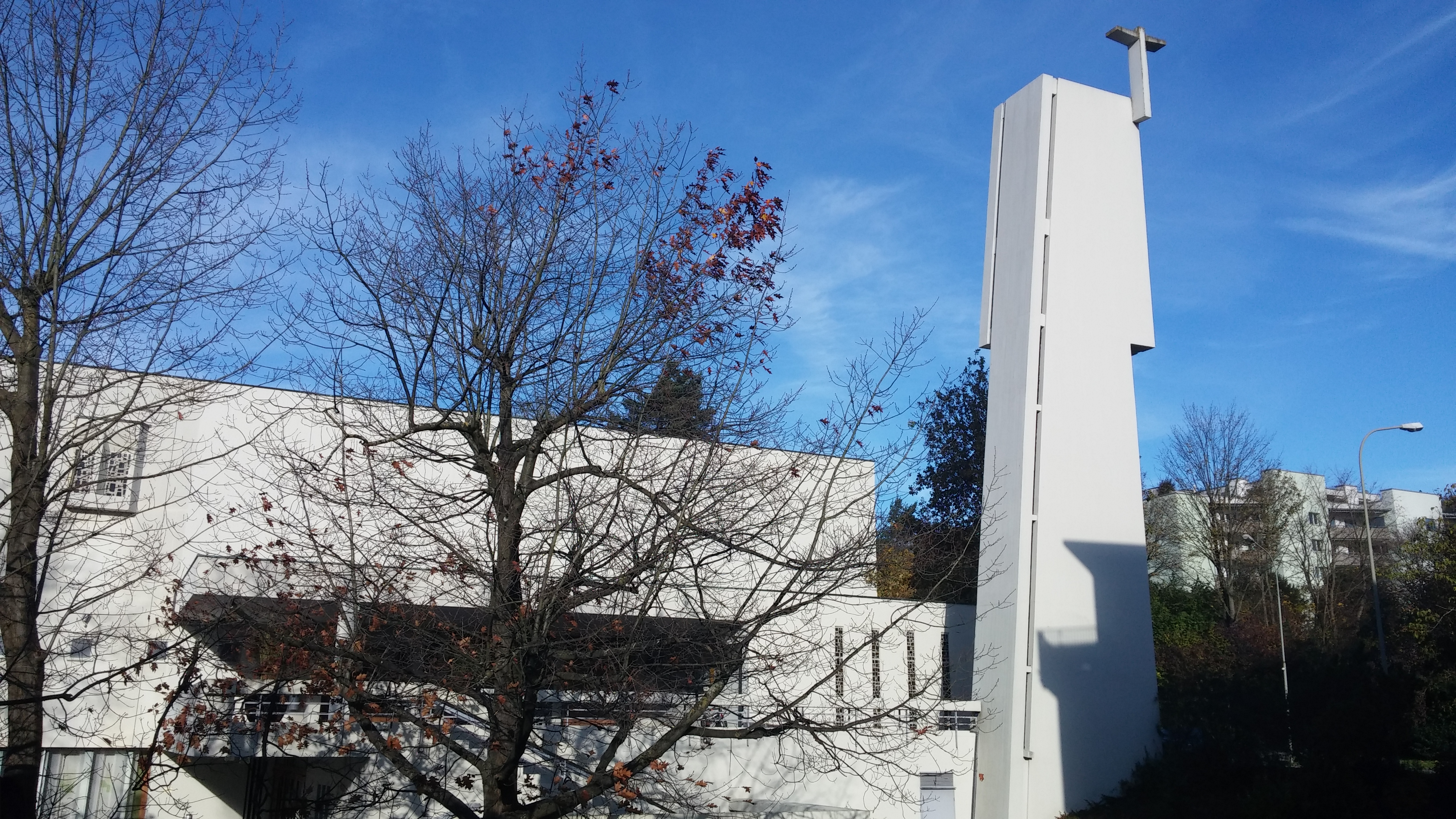
St. Mauritius Church, Oberengstringen (1962–1963)
