= Lörrach-Stetten station =

Railway station in Lörrach, Germany

Lörrach-Stetten
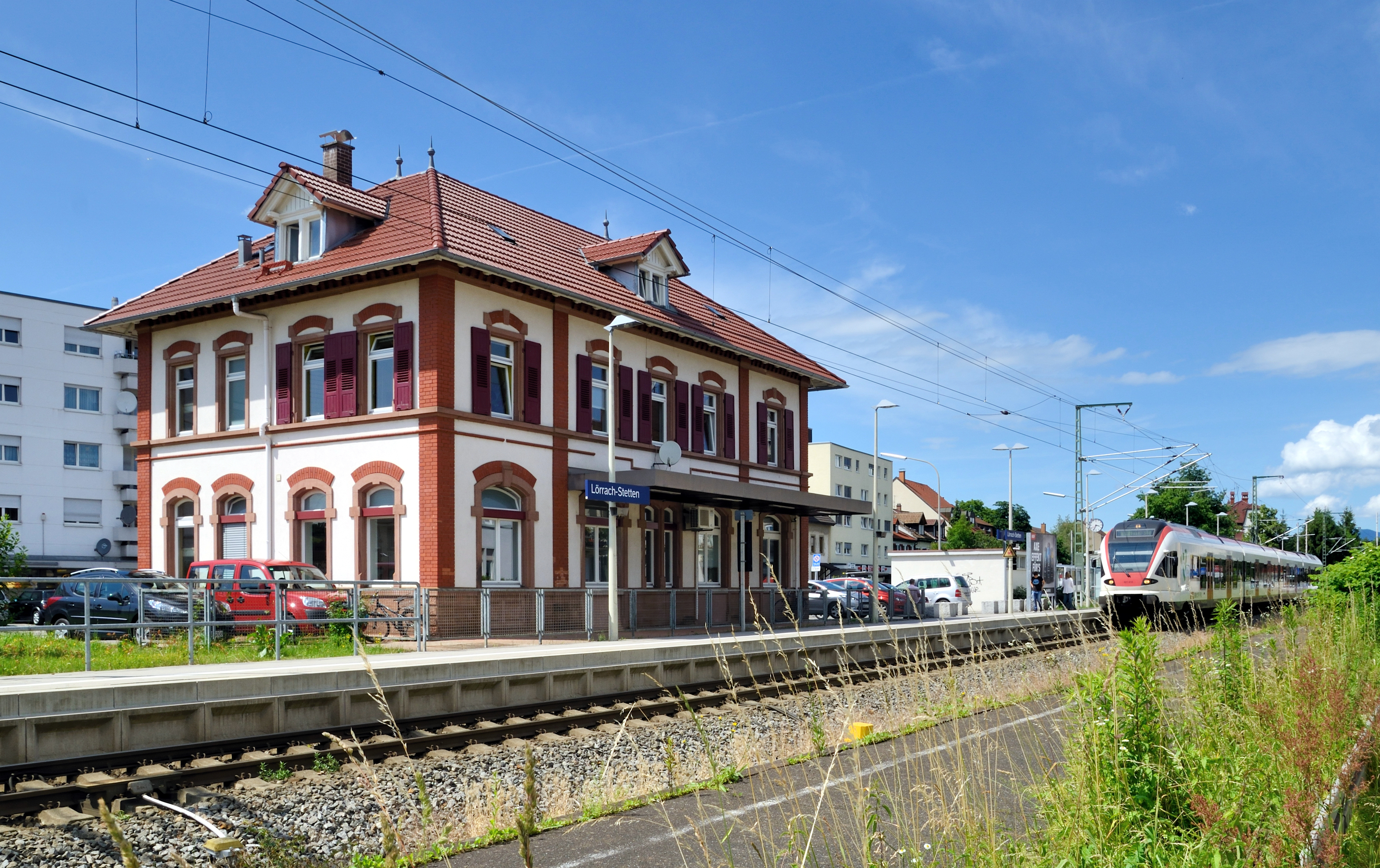
- The station in 2012

General information
- Location: Lörrach, Baden-Württemberg; Germany
- Coordinates: 47°36′05″N 7°39′33″E
- Owner: Deutsche Bahn
- Lines: Weil am Rhein–Lörrach line (KBS 734); Wiese Valley Railway (KBS 735)
- Distance: 4.8 km (3.0 mi) from Weil am Rhein; 5.0 km (3.1 mi) from Basel Bad Bf
- Platforms: 1 side platform
- Tracks: 1
- Train operators: SBB GmbH
- Connections: SWEG bus lines

Other information
- Fare zone: 1 (RVL)

Services
Preceding station	Basel S-Bahn	Following station
Lörrach Dammstraße towards Weil am Rhein	S5	Lörrach Museum/Burghof towards Zell (Wiesental)
Riehen towards Basel SBB	S6	Lörrach Museum/Burghof towards Zell (Wiesental)
Location

Lörrach-Stetten station (German: Bahnhof Lörrach-Stetten) is a railway station in the municipality of Lörrach, in Baden-Württemberg, Germany. It is located at the junction of the standard gauge Weil am Rhein–Lörrach line and Wiese Valley Railway of Deutsche Bahn.

== Services ==
As of the December 2020 timetable change, the following services stop at Lörrach-Stetten:

- Basel S-Bahn:
  - S5: half-hourly service between Weil am Rhein and Steinen on weekdays; hourly service to Lörrach Hauptbahnhof on Saturdays and Zell (Wiesental) on Sundays.
  - S6: half-hourly service between Basel SBB and Zell (Wiesental).
