= Weil am Rhein Ost station =

Railway station in Weil am Rhein, Germany

Weil am Rhein Ost
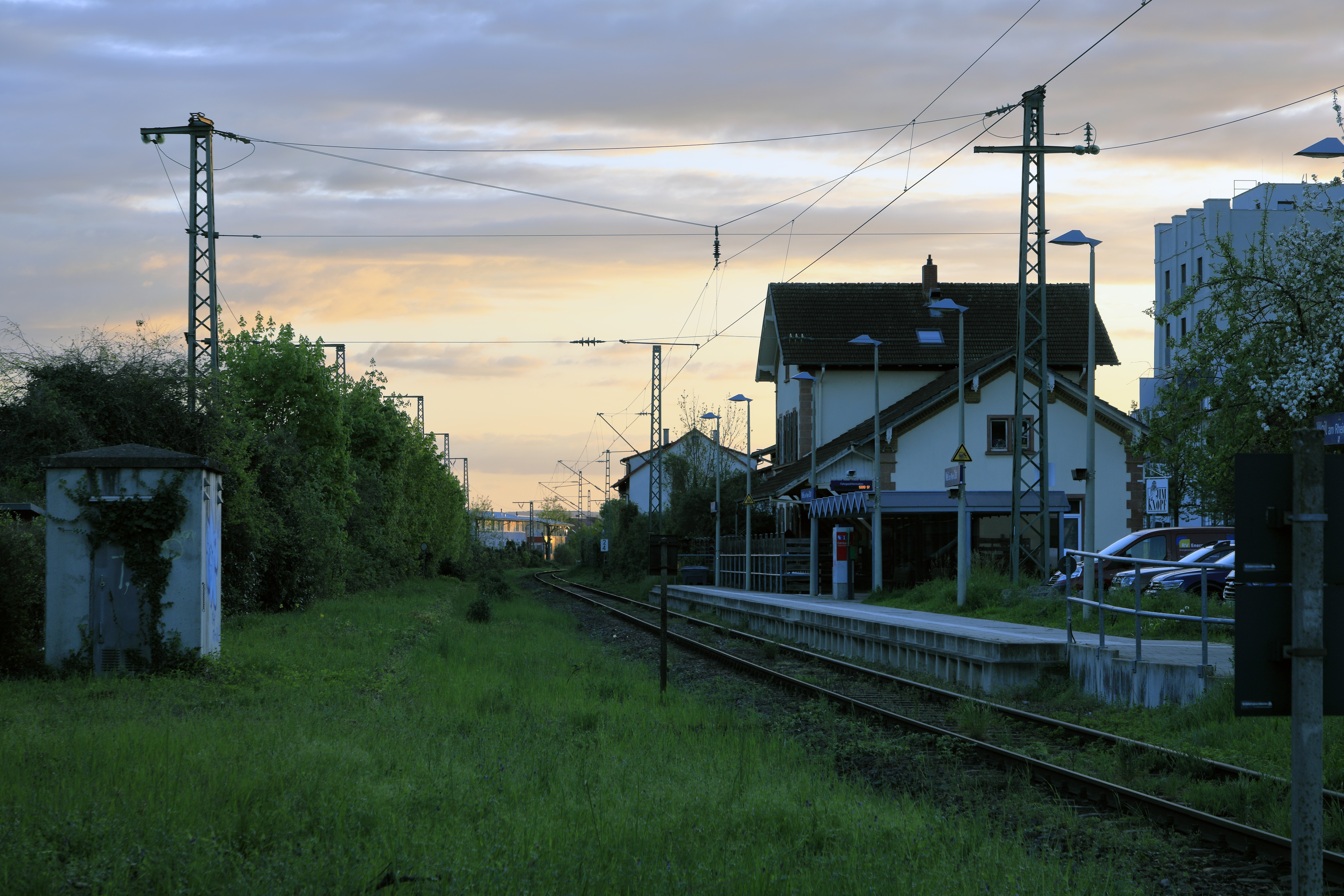
- The station in 2024

General information
- Location: Weil am Rhein, Baden-Württemberg; Germany
- Coordinates: 47°35′26″N 7°38′05″E
- Owner: Deutsche Bahn
- Lines: Weil am Rhein–Lörrach line (KBS 734)
- Distance: 2.5 km (1.6 mi) from Weil am Rhein
- Platforms: 1 side platform
- Tracks: 1
- Train operators: SBB GmbH

Other information
- Fare zone: 3 (RVL)

Services
Preceding station	Basel S-Bahn	Following station
Weil am Rhein Pfädlistraße towards Weil am Rhein	S5	Lörrach Dammstraße towards Zell (Wiesental)
Location

Weil am Rhein Ost station (German: Bahnhof Weil am Rhein Ost) is a railway station in the municipality of Weil am Rhein, in Baden-Württemberg, Germany. It is located on the standard gauge Weil am Rhein–Lörrach line of Deutsche Bahn.

== Services ==
As of the December 2020 timetable change, the following services stop at Weil am Rhein Ost:

- Basel S-Bahn S5: half-hourly service between Weil am Rhein and Steinen on weekdays; hourly service to Lörrach Hauptbahnhof on Saturdays and Zell (Wiesental) on Sundays.
