= Lörrach Dammstraße station =

Railway station in Lörrach, Germany

Lörrach Dammstraße
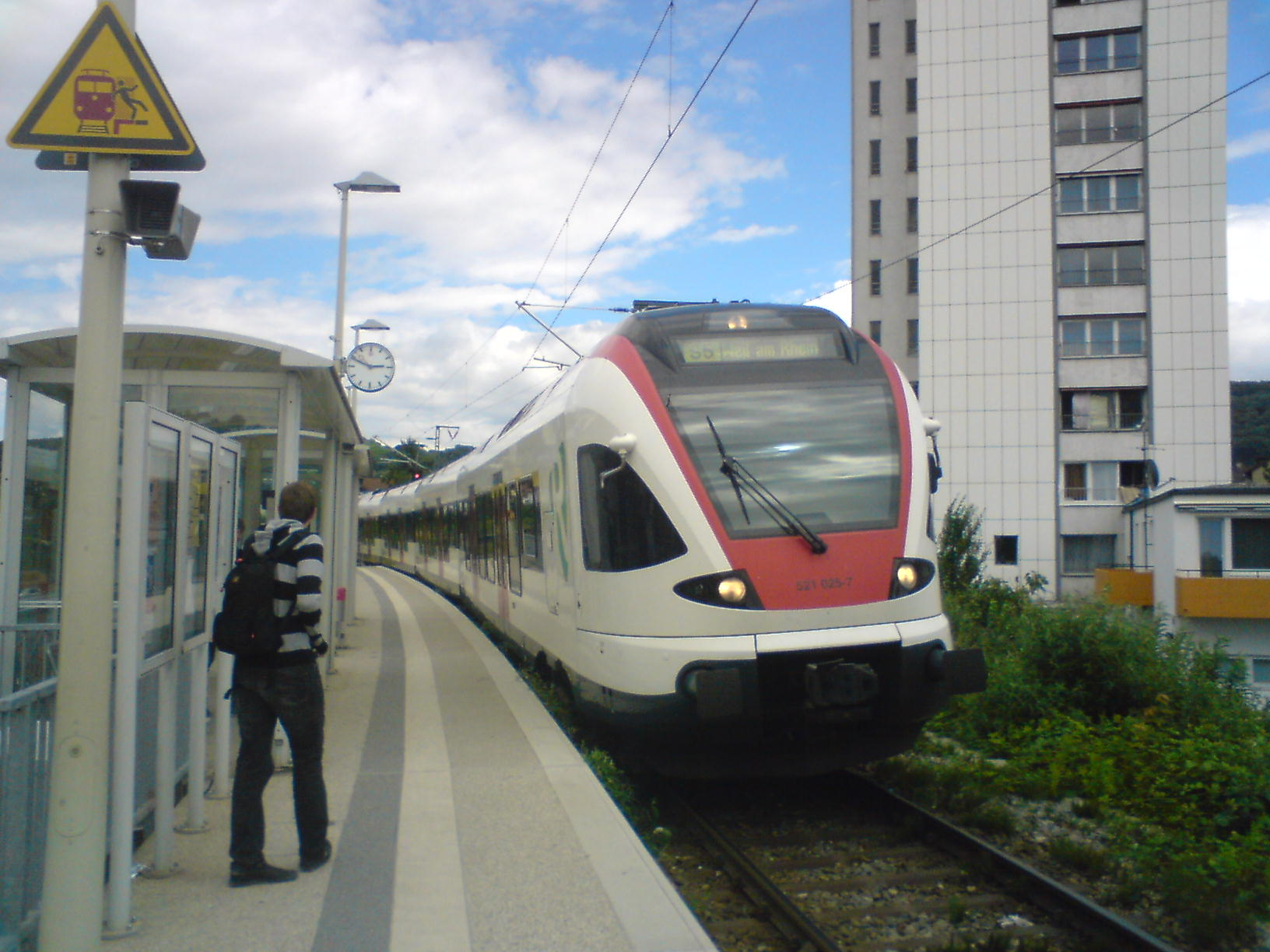
- An S5 arrives in 2009

General information
- Location: Lörrach, Baden-Württemberg; Germany
- Coordinates: 47°35′52″N 7°39′19″E
- Owner: Deutsche Bahn
- Lines: Weil am Rhein–Lörrach line (KBS 734)
- Distance: 4.4 km (2.7 mi) from Weil am Rhein
- Platforms: 1 side platform
- Tracks: 1
- Train operators: SBB GmbH

Other information
- Fare zone: 1 (RVL)

Services
Preceding station	Basel S-Bahn	Following station
Weil am Rhein Ost towards Weil am Rhein	S5	Lörrach-Stetten towards Zell (Wiesental)
Location

Lörrach Dammstraße station (German: Bahnhof Lörrach Dammstraße) is a railway station in the municipality of Lörrach, in Baden-Württemberg, Germany. It is located on the standard gauge Weil am Rhein–Lörrach line of Deutsche Bahn.

== Services ==
As of the December 2020 timetable change, the following services stop at Lörrach Dammstraße:

- Basel S-Bahn S5: half-hourly service between Weil am Rhein and Steinen on weekdays; hourly service to Lörrach Hauptbahnhof on Saturdays and Zell (Wiesental) on Sundays.
