= Lörrach Museum/Burghof station =

Railway station in Lörrach, Germany

Lörrach Museum/Burghof
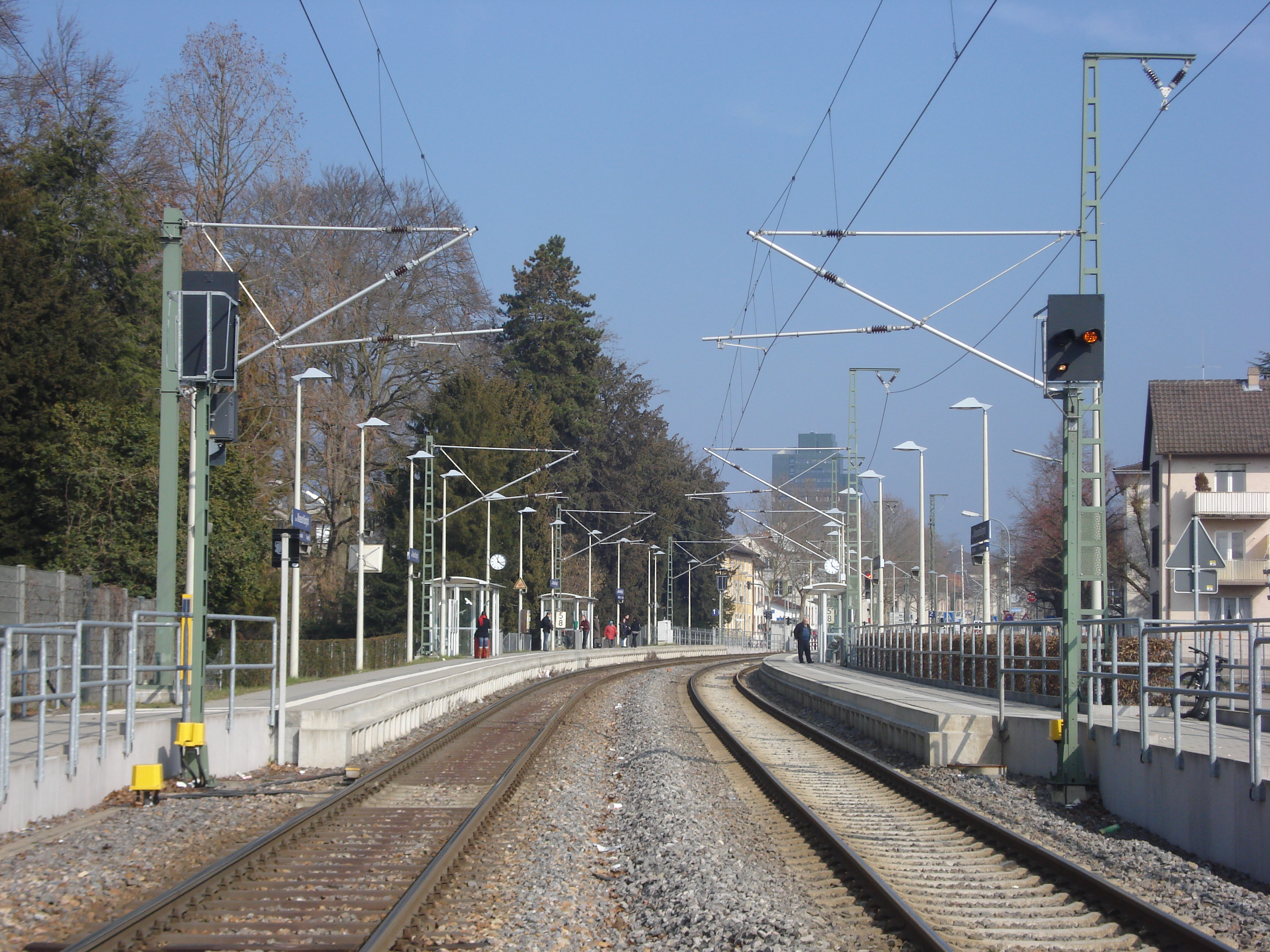
- The station in 2011

General information
- Location: Lörrach, Baden-Württemberg; Germany
- Coordinates: 47°36′29″N 7°39′40″E
- Owner: Deutsche Bahn
- Lines: Wiese Valley Railway (KBS 735)
- Distance: 5.8 km (3.6 mi) from Basel Bad Bf
- Platforms: 2 side platforms
- Tracks: 2
- Train operators: SBB GmbH
- Connections: SWEG bus lines

Other information
- Fare zone: 1 (RVL)

Services
Preceding station	Basel S-Bahn	Following station
Lörrach-Stetten towards Weil am Rhein	S5	Lörrach Hbf towards Zell (Wiesental)
Lörrach-Stetten towards Basel SBB	S6	Lörrach Hbf towards Zell (Wiesental)
Location

Lörrach Museum/Burghof station (German: Bahnhof Lörrach Museum/Burghof) is a railway station in the municipality of Lörrach, in Baden-Württemberg, Germany. It is located on standard gauge Wiese Valley Railway of Deutsche Bahn.

== Services ==
As of the December 2020 timetable change, the following services stop at Lörrach Museum/Burghof:

- Basel S-Bahn:
  - S5: half-hourly service between Weil am Rhein and Steinen on weekdays; hourly service to Lörrach Hauptbahnhof on Saturdays and Zell (Wiesental) on Sundays.
  - S6: half-hourly service between Basel SBB and Zell (Wiesental).
