= Riehen railway station =

German owned railway station in Switzerland

Riehen
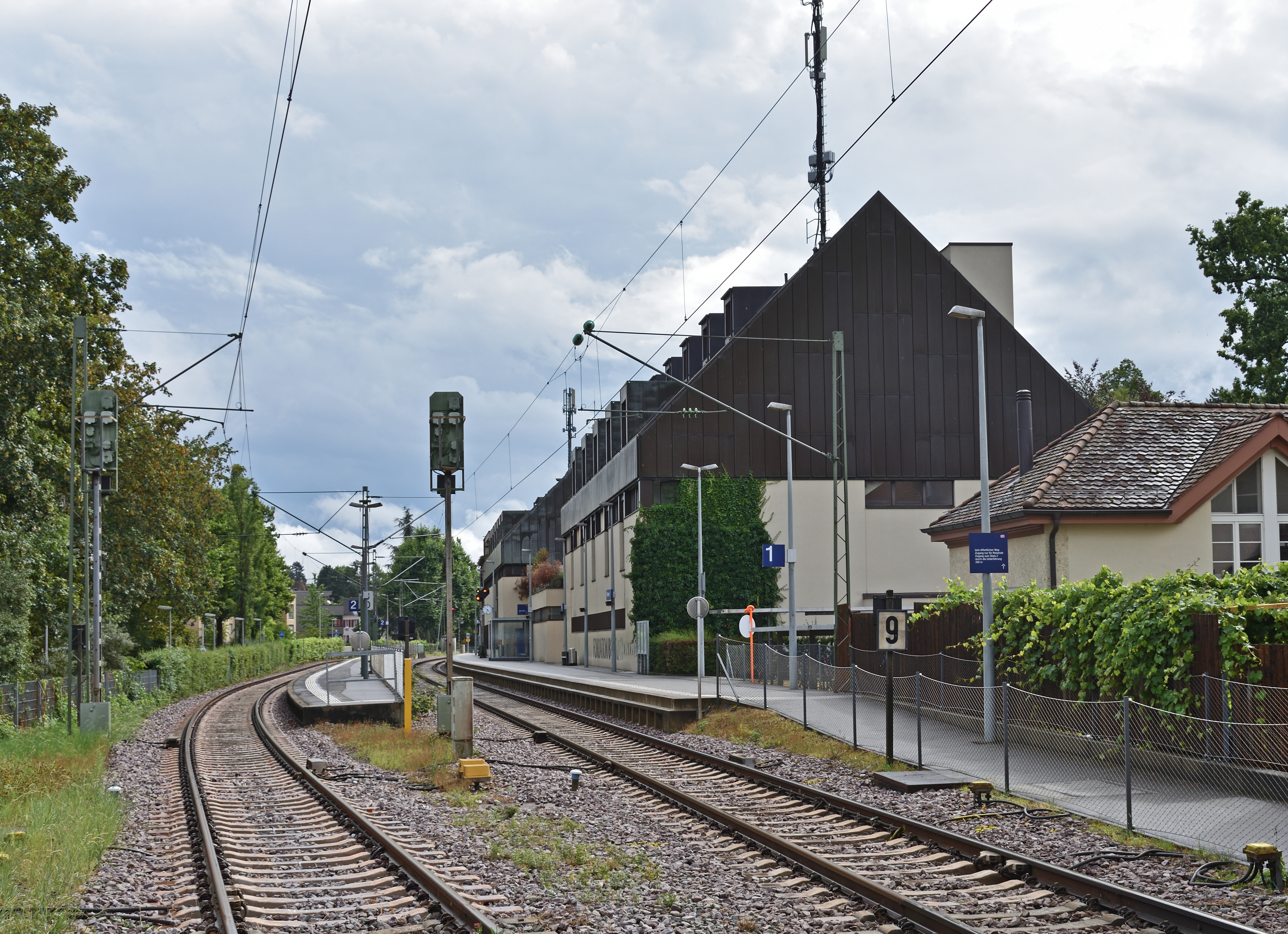
- Station platforms

General information
- Location: Riehen, Basel-Stadt; Switzerland
- Coordinates: 47°35′01″N 7°39′08″E
- Owner: Bundeseisenbahnvermögen (since 1994)
- Lines: Wiese Valley Railway (KBS 735)
- Distance: 3.0 km (1.9 mi) from Basel Bad Bf
- Platforms: 1 side platform
- Tracks: 1
- Train operators: SBB GmbH
- Connections: BVB bus lines

Other information
- Fare zone: 8 (RVL); 10 (tnw)

Services
Preceding station	Basel S-Bahn	Following station
Riehen Niederholz towards Basel SBB	S6	Lörrach-Stetten towards Zell (Wiesental)
Location
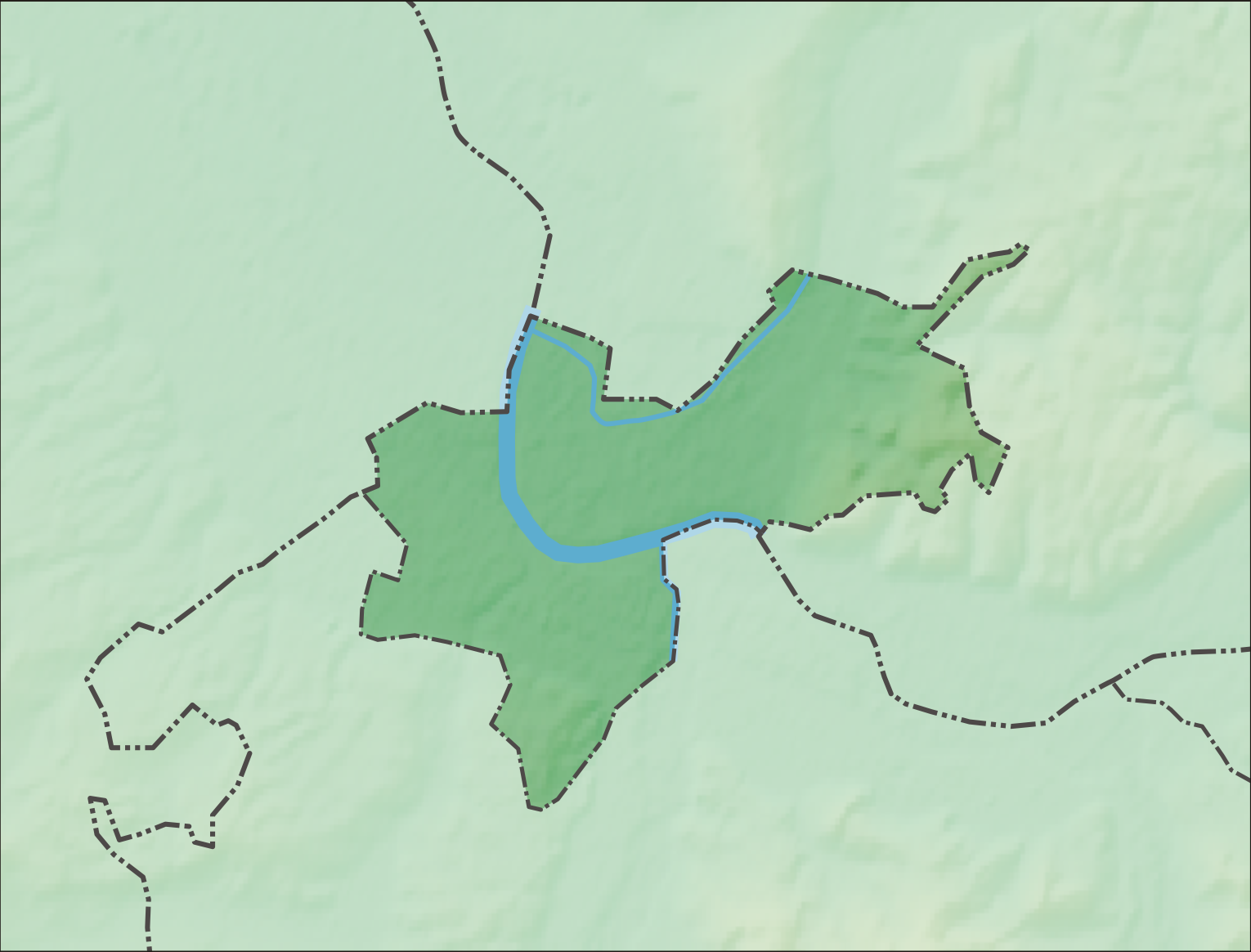
- Location within Switzerland Location within Canton of Basel-Stadt

Riehen railway station (German: Bahnhof Riehen) is a railway station in the municipality of Riehen, in the Swiss canton of Basel-Stadt. It is located on the standard gauge Wiese Valley Railway of Deutsche Bahn.

== Services ==
As of the December 2020 timetable change, the following services stop at Riehen:

- Basel S-Bahn S6: half-hourly service between Basel SBB and Zell (Wiesental).

== See also ==
- Rail transport in Switzerland
