= Riehen Niederholz railway station =

German owned railway station in Switzerland

Riehen Niederholz
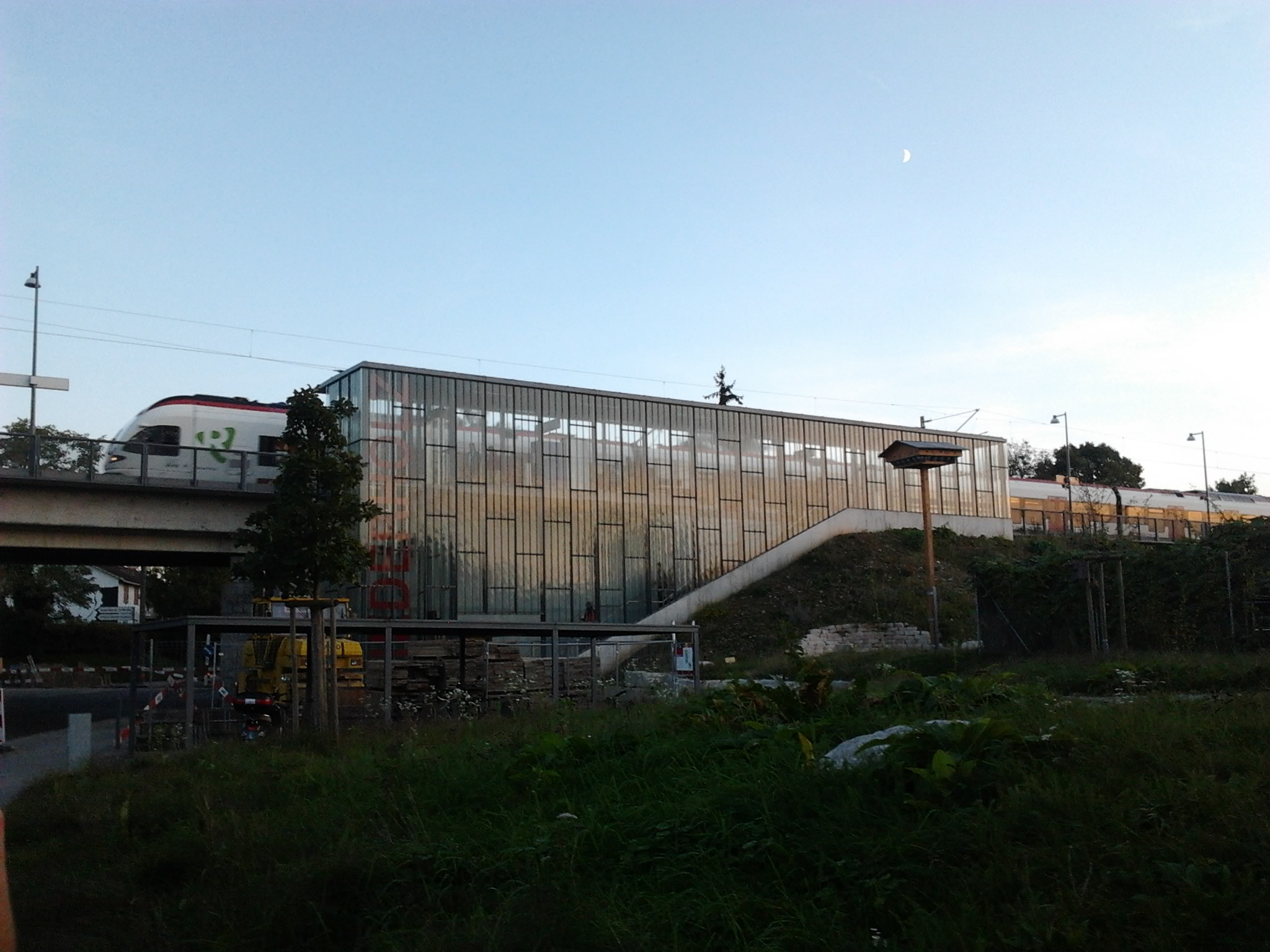
- The station in 2012

General information
- Location: Riehen, Basel-Stadt; Switzerland
- Coordinates: 47°34′10″N 7°38′00″E
- Elevation: 265 m (869 ft)
- Owner: Bundeseisenbahnvermögen
- Lines: Wiese Valley Railway (KBS 735)
- Distance: 0.8 km (0.50 mi) from Basel Bad Bf
- Platforms: 1 side platform
- Tracks: 1
- Train operators: SBB GmbH
- Connections: BVB bus lines

Other information
- Fare zone: 8 (RVL); 10 (tnw)

History
- Opened: 2008

Services
Preceding station	Basel S-Bahn	Following station
Basel Bad Bf towards Basel SBB	S6	Riehen towards Zell (Wiesental)
Location
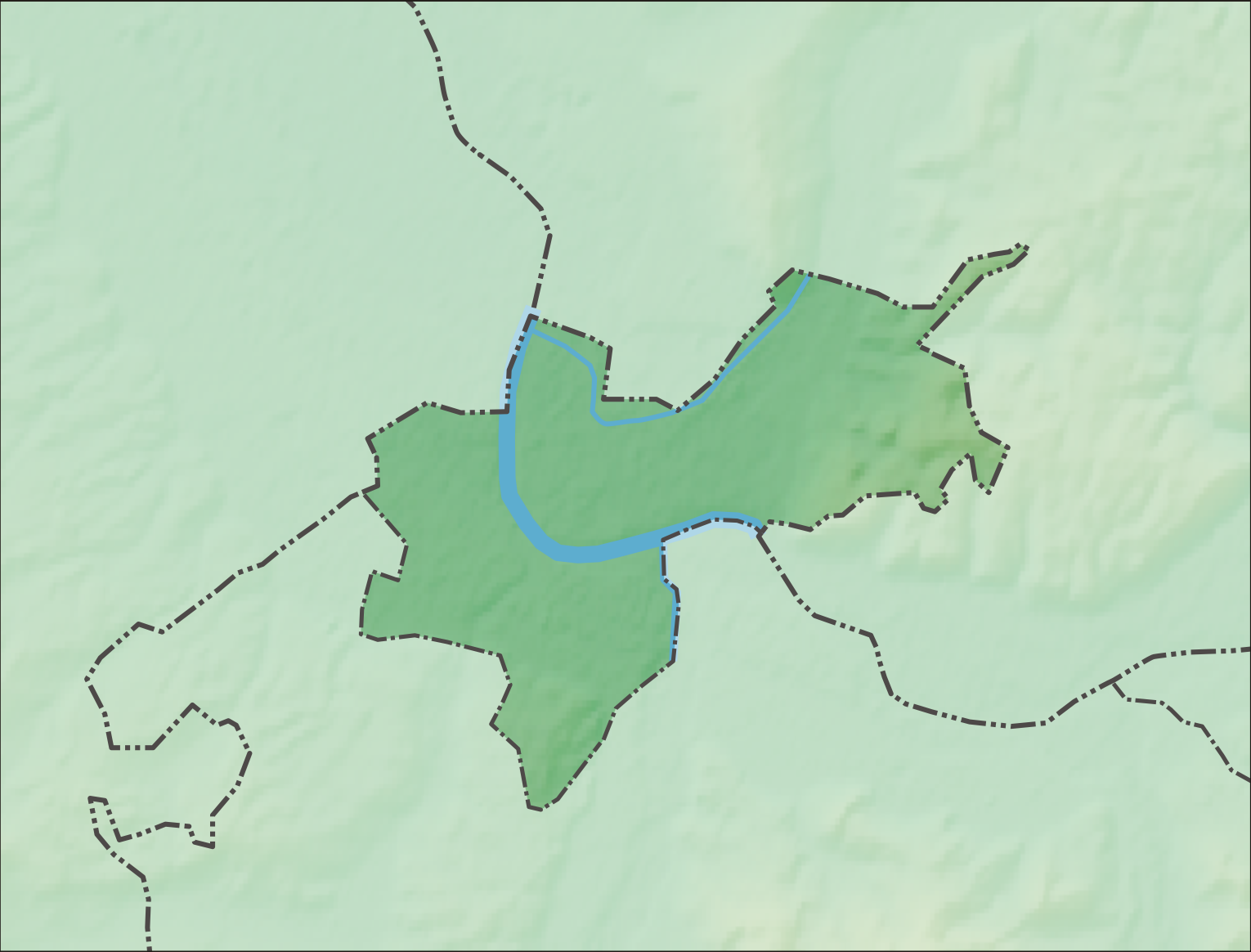
- Location within Switzerland Location within Canton of Basel-Stadt

Riehen Niederholz railway station (German: Bahnhof Riehen Niederholz) is a railway station in the municipality of Riehen, in the Swiss canton of Basel-Stadt. It is located on the standard gauge Wiese Valley Railway of Deutsche Bahn.

== Services ==
As of the December 2020 timetable change, the following services stop at Riehen Niederholz:

- Basel S-Bahn S6: half-hourly service between Basel SBB and Zell (Wiesental).
