= Lörrach Hauptbahnhof =

Railway station in Lörrach, Germany

Lörrach Hbf
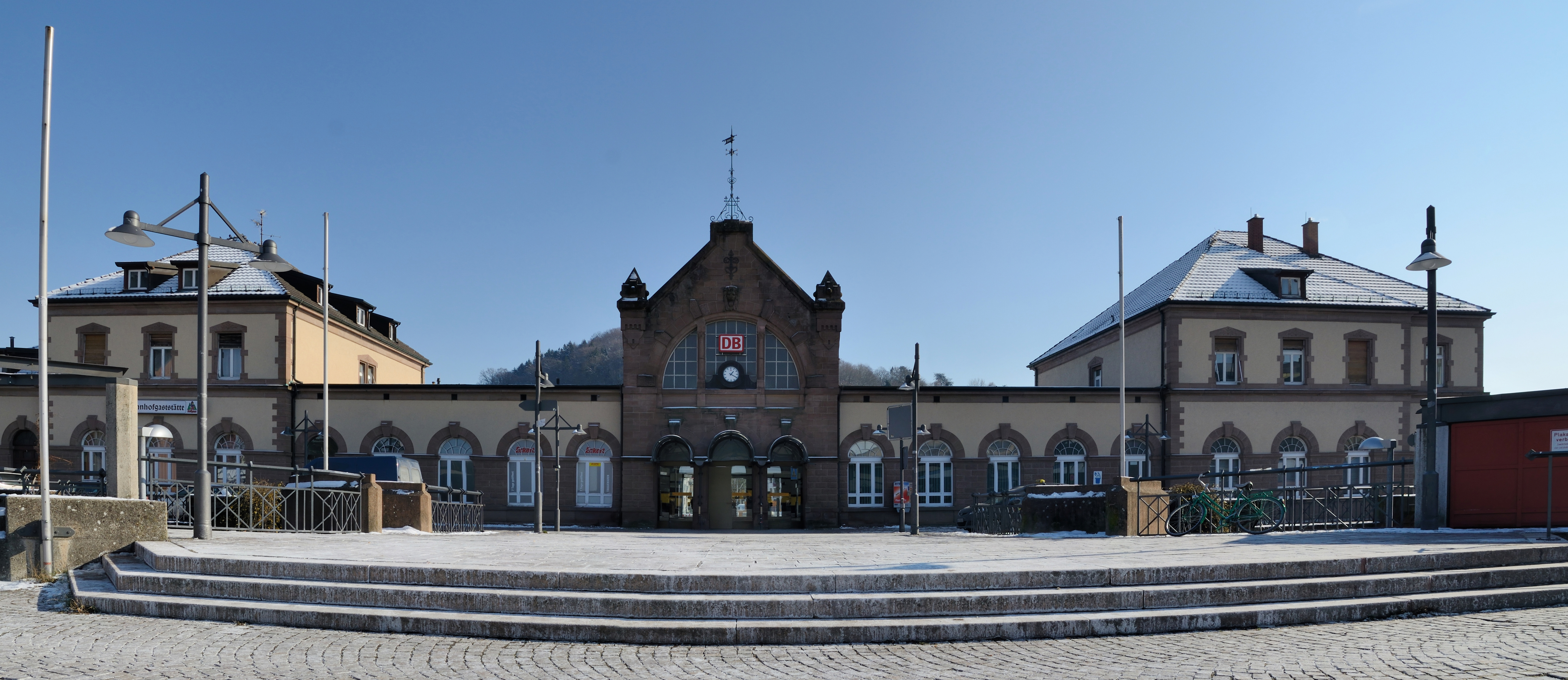
- The front of the station building in 2012

General information
- Location: Lörrach, Baden-Württemberg; Germany
- Coordinates: 47°36′51″N 7°39′56″E
- Owner: Deutsche Bahn
- Lines: Wiese Valley Railway (KBS 735)
- Distance: 6.5 km (4.0 mi) from Basel Bad Bf
- Platforms: 1 island platform; 1 side platform
- Tracks: 3
- Train operators: SBB GmbH
- Connections: SWEG bus lines

Construction
- Accessible: Yes

Other information
- Station code: 3783
- DS100 code: RLR
- IBNR: 8003729
- Category: 4
- Fare zone: 1 (RVL)
- Website: www.bahnhof.de

History
- Opened: 5 June 1862
- Electrified: 13 September 1913

Services
Preceding station	Basel S-Bahn	Following station
Lörrach Museum/Burghof towards Weil am Rhein	S5	Lörrach Schwarzwaldstraße towards Zell (Wiesental)
Lörrach Museum/Burghof towards Basel SBB	S6	Lörrach Schwarzwaldstraße towards Zell (Wiesental)
Location
- Location within Baden-Württemberg Location within Germany

Lörrach Hauptbahnhof is one of seven stations and halts in Lörrach in the German state of Baden-Württemberg. The station located on the Wiese Valley Railway (Wiesentalbahn) from Basel Badischer station to Zell im Wiesental and is classified by Deutsche Bahn as a category 4 station. Its train services are part of the Basel S-Bahn and are operated by SBB GmbH, a subsidiary of Swiss Federal Railways.

== History ==
Lörrach station was opened in 1862 as part of the first private railway in the Grand Duchy of Baden, which was built by the Wiese Valley Railway Company (Wiesenthalbahn-Gesellschaft). The line ran from the Basel Baden station in Basel, where it connected to the Baden Mainline, to Schopfheim. It was extended to Zell in 1876. The first test run was carried out on 10 May 1862 and on 5 June the line was formally opened in the presence of the Grand Duke Friedrich of Baden. In the 1860s, before the opening of the line, the location the Lörrach station was a controversial issue. Technical and financial issues eventually led to the selection of its current location just north of Rheinfelder Straße (now Wallbrunnstraße). The Grand Duchy of Baden State Railway acquired the line and station as of 1 January 1889. The first station building was built in 1862 and it was rebuilt in 1905.

The passenger station and the associated freight yard formerly had four signal boxes, but these were replaced in 2004 with an electronic interlocking. The station was called Lörrach station until 2009, when it was renamed at the initiative of the Free Voters (Freie Wähler). At the end of 2011, a bike parking garage was built in the northern part of the station building.

== Location ==
The station is located in Lörrach on the eastern edge of the pedestrian zone developed by the city near the main post office, the Lörrach town hall and the central bus station. Currently, as part of urban development and the redesign of Belchenstraße, connections between the station and the city's eastern district are being improved. It is estimated that this work will be completed in May 2013.

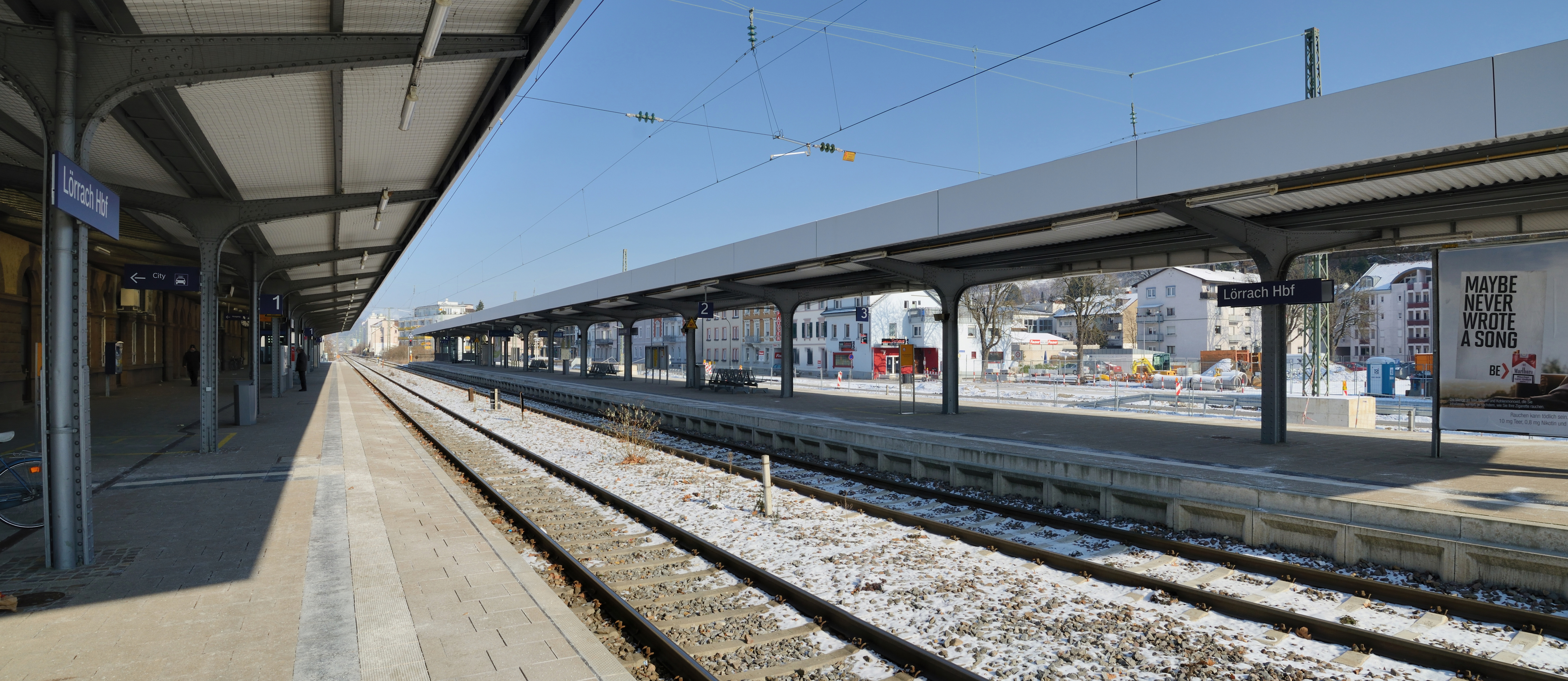
Platforms

== Infrastructure ==
The entrance building consists of a five-part structure with its facade clad in dressed stone. Together with the north and south signal boxes, each building has brick walls and a hipped roof. The complex is listed in the city's heritage register.

Lörrach has included, since 1963, a motorail terminal of DB AutoZug, located in the freight yard 500 metres north-north-east of the passenger platforms. DB AutoZug terminated operations in 2013. From 2016, Bahntouristikexpress runs a weekly night train from this terminal to Hamburg, which was put under the Flixtrain brand from 2018.

== Services ==
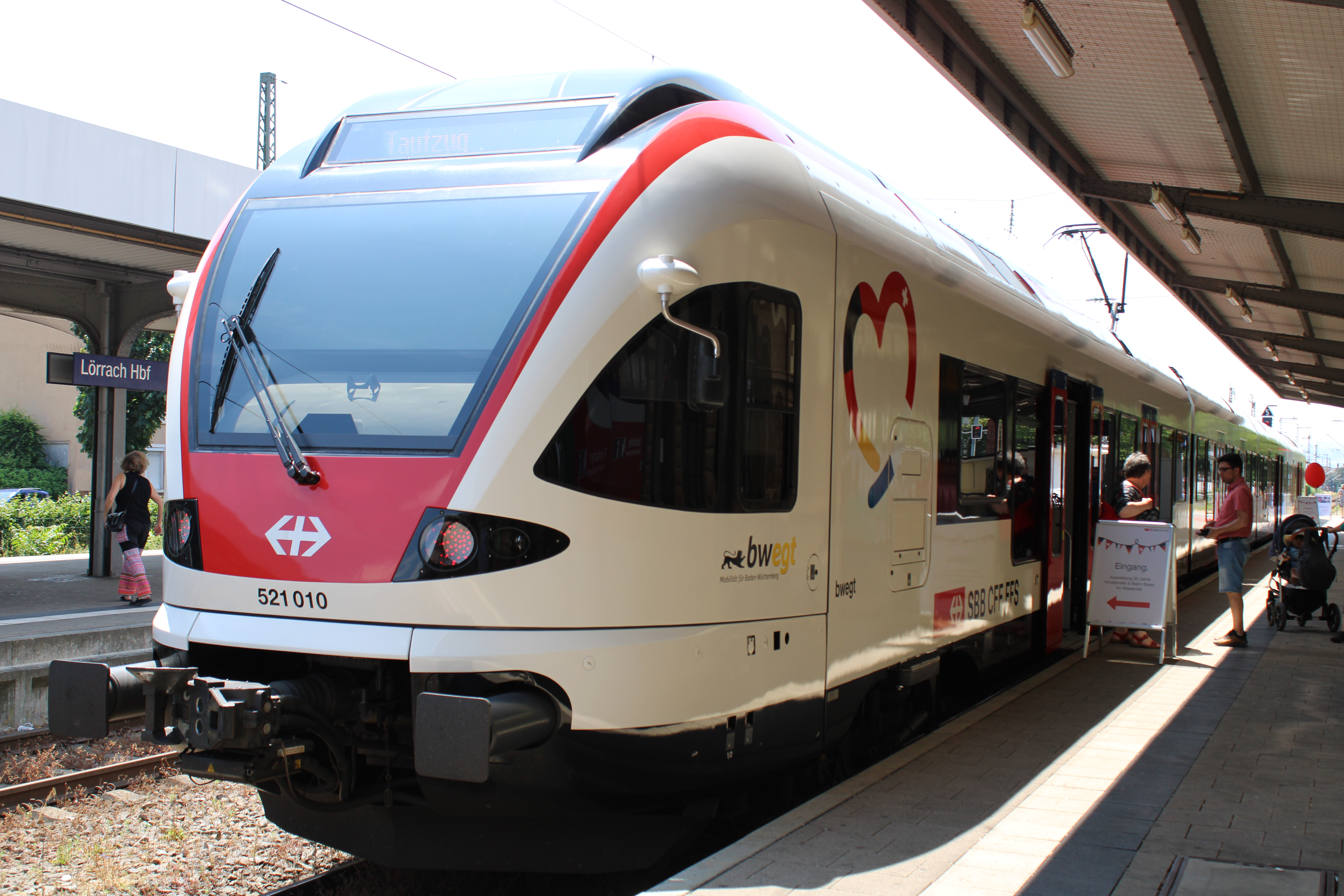
SBB Train

As of the December 2020 timetable change, the following services stop at Lörrach Hauptbahnhof:

- Basel S-Bahn:
  - S5: half-hourly service between Weil am Rhein and Steinen on weekdays; hourly service to Weil am Rhein on Saturdays and Zell (Wiesental) on Sundays.
  - S6: half-hourly service between Basel SBB and Zell (Wiesental).
