= Weil am Rhein–Lörrach railway =

Railway in Baden-Württemberg, Germany

Weil am Rhein–Lörrach-Stetten railway
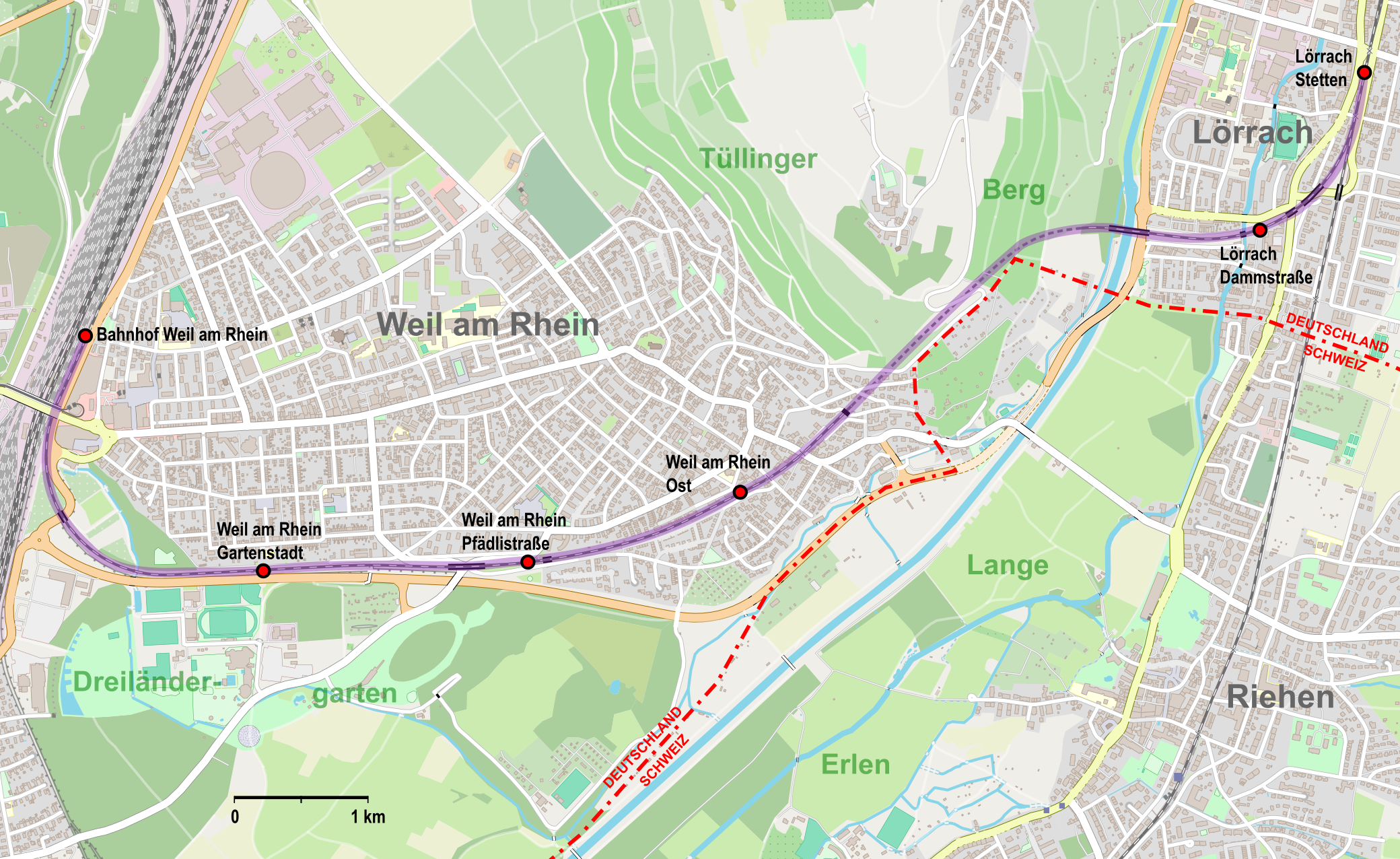
- Map of the Weil am Rhein-Lörrach railway

Overview
- Other name(s): Garden Railway
- Native name: Gartenbahn
- Line number: 4410
- Locale: Baden-Württemberg, Germany

Service
- Route number: 734

Technical
- Line length: 4.836 km (3.005 mi)
- Track gauge: 1,435 mm (4 ft 8 1/2 in) standard gauge
- Electrification: 15 kV/16.7 Hz AC overhead catenary
- Maximum incline: 1%

The Weil am Rhine–Lörrach railway (timetable line 734), also known as the Gartenbahn ("Garden Railway"), is a 4.836 km long electrified, single-track main line railway in the German state of Baden-Württemberg, near Basel. It runs from Weil am Rhein on the Rhine Valley Railway through Tüllinger Berg (Tüllingen mountain) to Lörrach-Stetten on the Wiese Valley Railway. The continuation of the former bypass of Switzerland was the now disused Wehra Valley Railway (German: Wehratalbahn) from a branch near Schopfheim on the Wiese Valley Railway to Bad Säckingen on the High Rhine Railway (Hochrheinbahn).

== History ==
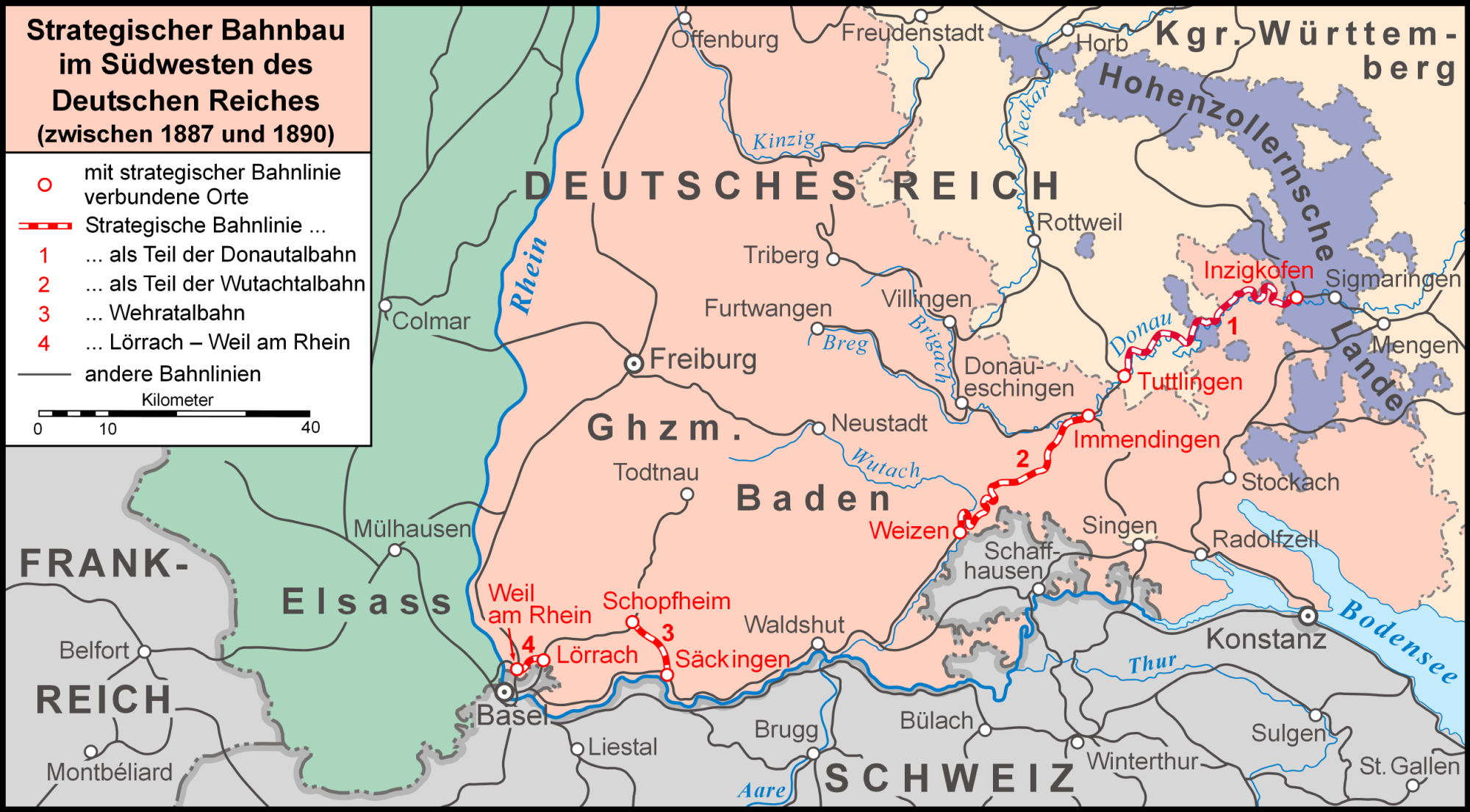
The line as a section of the strategic railway built between 1887 and 1890 to bypass Switzerland

The Weil am Rhine–Lörrach railway was opened on 20 May 1890 by the Grand Duchy of Baden State Railways (Großherzoglich Badische Staatseisenbahnen, G.Bad.St.E.), as a strategic railway to bypass Switzerland.

The first stage in the development of the line so that it could be integrated in the Basel trinational S-Bahn (Trinationale S-Bahn Basel) was carried out in 1999 with the opening of stations at Weil am Rhein Gartenstadt (literally “Weil on Rhine Garden City”) and Weil am Rhein Pfädlistraße. Since 15 June 2003, SBB GmbH, a subsidiary of the Swiss Federal Railways (SBB), responsible for passenger transport operations is Germany, has operated services on the line. Passenger services on the Weil am Rhine–Lörrach railway are now incorporated into the network as line S5 of the S-Bahn. DB Netz AG is still responsible for maintaining the railway infrastructure.

At the timetable change of 12 December 2004, line S5 was also extended via Lörrach Hauptbahnhof to Steinen. The new halt of Lörrach Dammstraße was opened on 12 June 2005.

The line has been served since the autumn of 2005 by Stadler FLIRT multiple units (Swiss class RABe 521, German class 429), which replaced NPZ sets modified for operation in Germany (class RBDe 561), which had been used as an interim solution. The last of these were withdrawn in March 2006.
